= Golden Globe Award for Best Actress in a Motion Picture – Musical or Comedy =

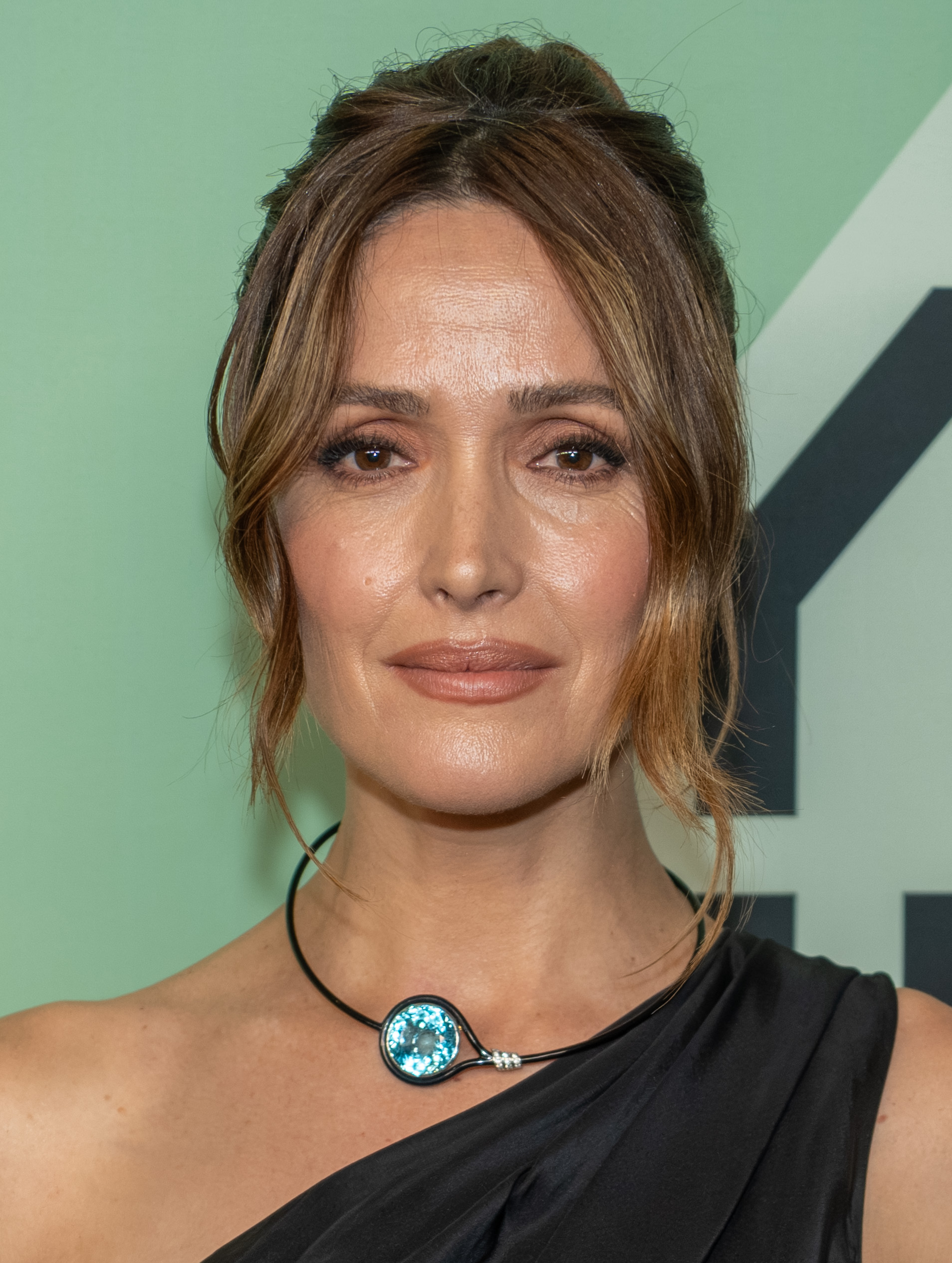
- The 2025 recipient: Rose Byrne
- Awarded for: Best Performance by a Leading Actress in a Motion Picture – Comedy or Musical
- Location: United States
- Presented by: Dick Clark Productions
- Currently held by: Rose Byrne for If I Had Legs I'd Kick You (2025)
- Website: goldenglobes.com

The Golden Globe Award for Best Actress in a Motion Picture – Musical or Comedy is a Golden Globe Award that was first awarded by the Hollywood Foreign Press Association as a separate category in 1951. Previously, there was a single award for "Best Actress in a Motion Picture", but the splitting allowed for recognition of it and the Best Actress – Drama.

The formal title has varied since its inception. In 2005, it was officially called "Best Performance by an Actress in a Motion Picture – Comedy or Musical". The current wording is "Best Actress in a Motion Picture – Musical or Comedy".

== Winners and nominees ==
indicates the winner

† Indicates the Academy Award winner

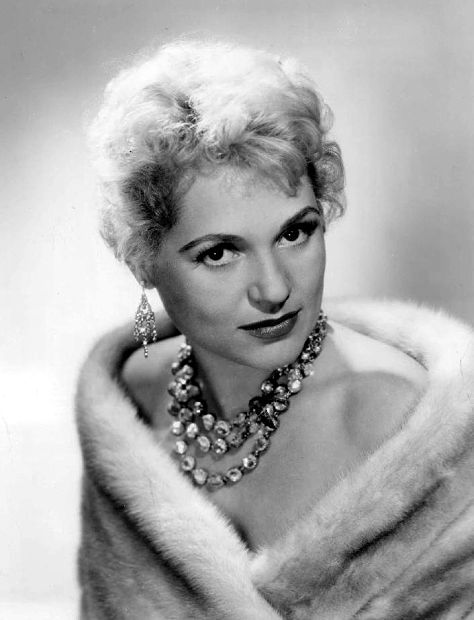
Judy Holliday won for Born Yesterday (1950)

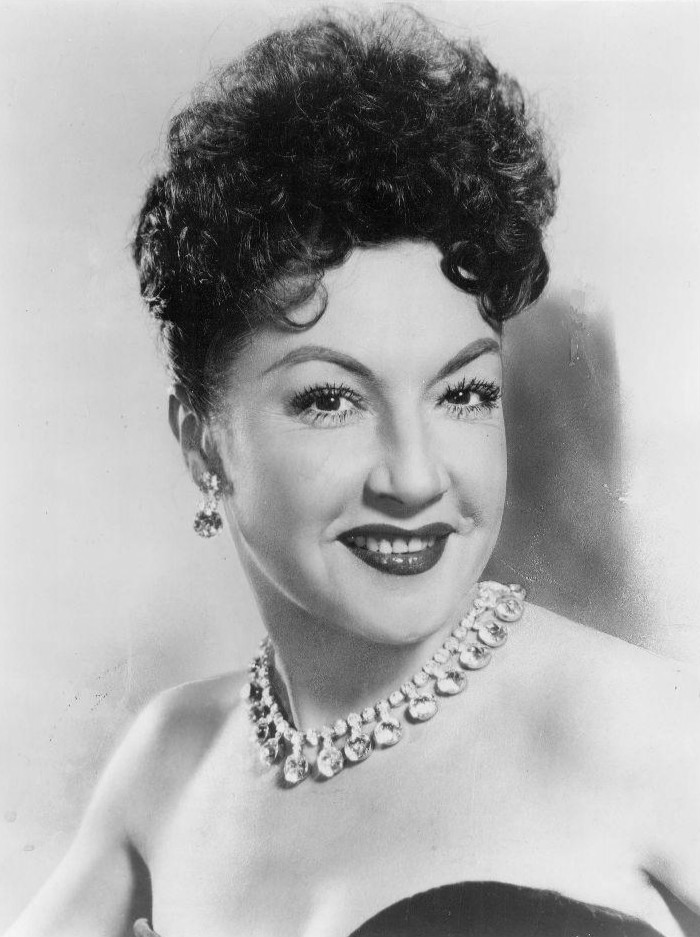
Ethel Merman won for Call Me Madam (1953)

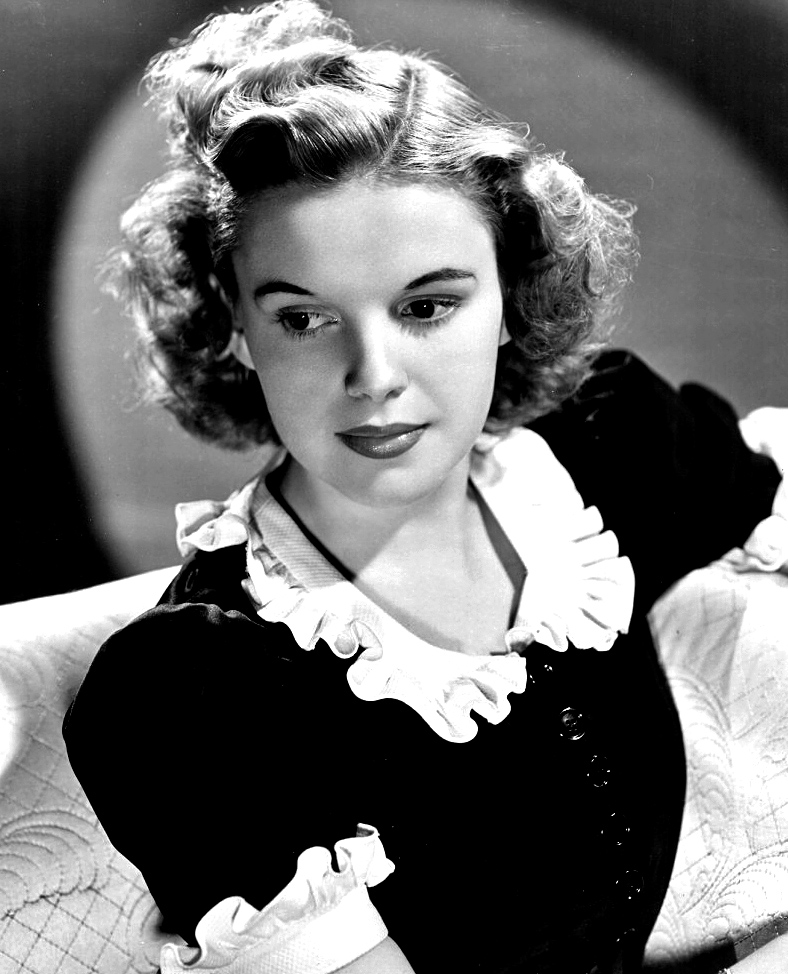
Judy Garland won for A Star is Born (1954)

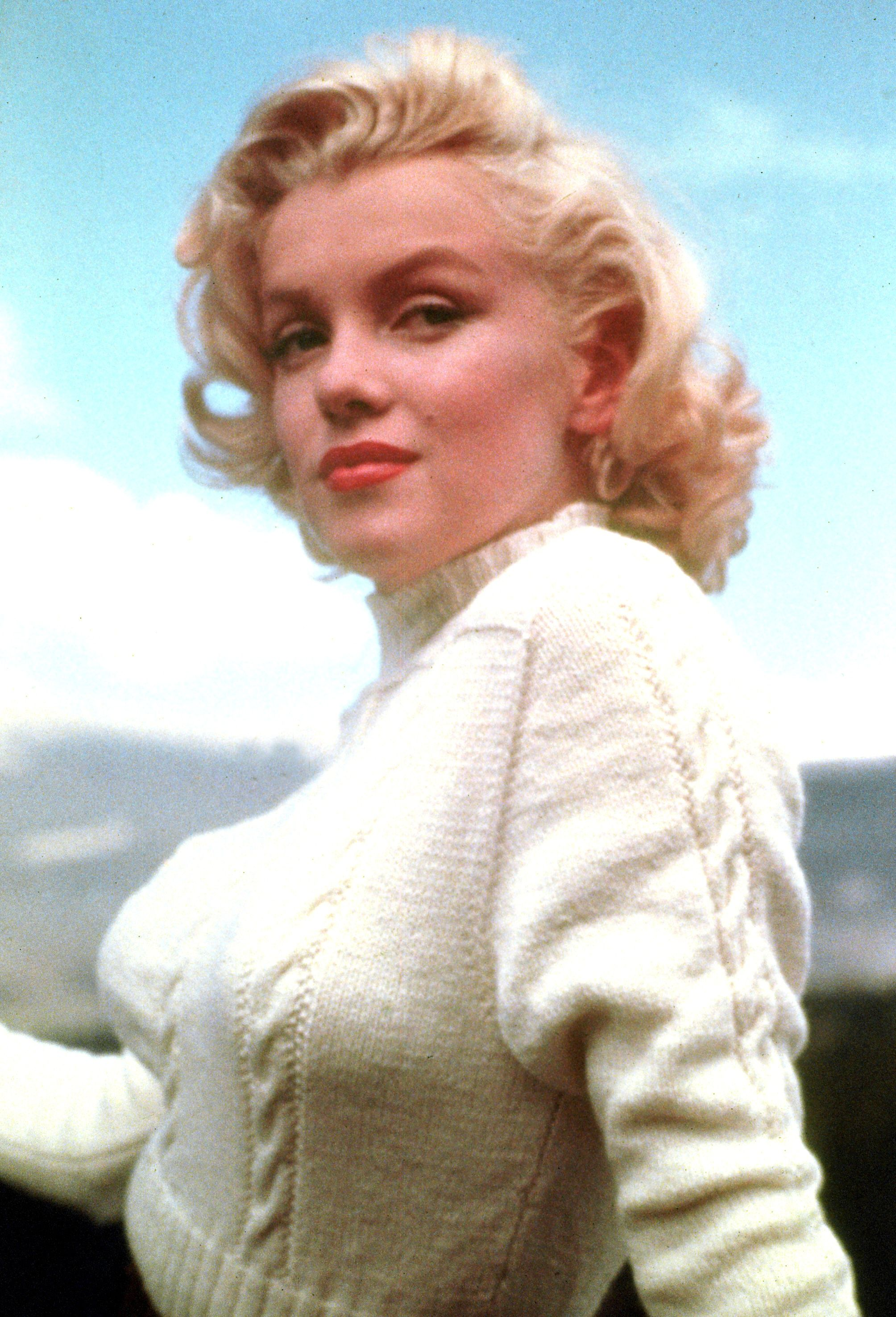
Marilyn Monroe won for Some Like It Hot (1959)

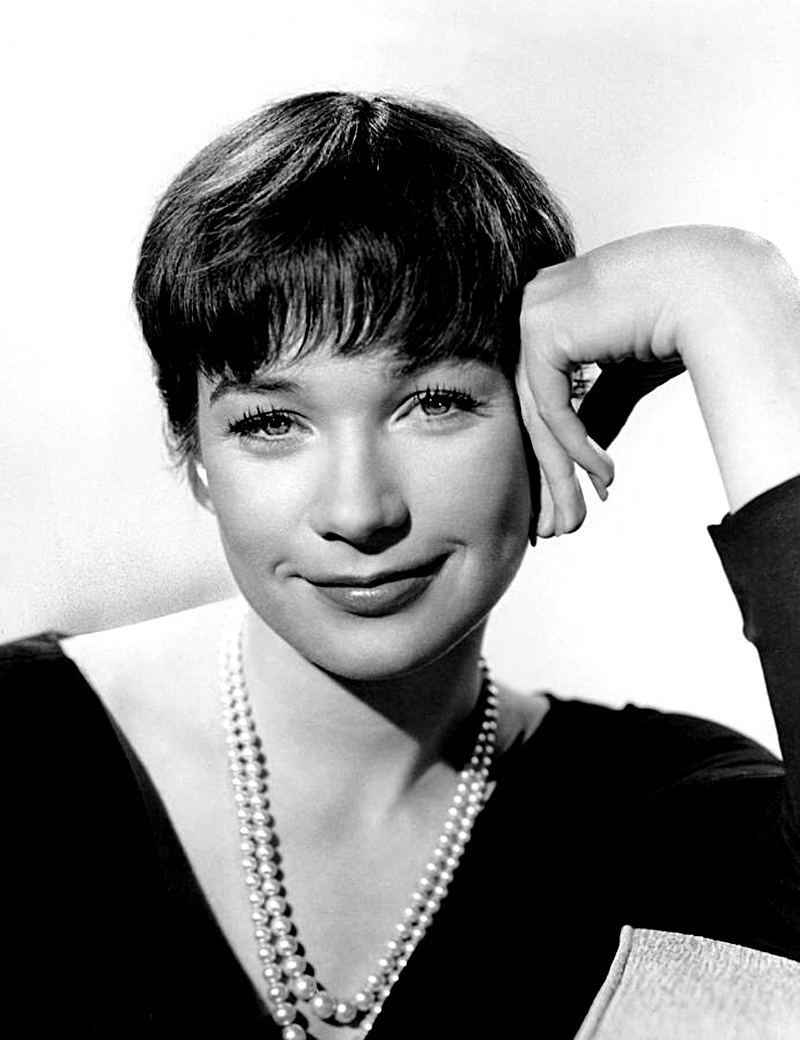
Shirley MacLaine won twice for The Apartment (1960) and Irma la Douce (1963)

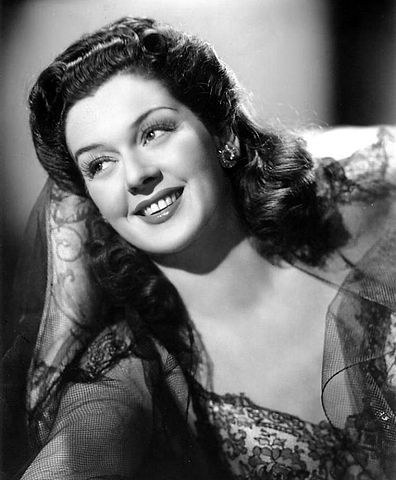
Rosalind Russell won three times, twice consecutive, for Auntie Mame (1958), A Majority of One (1961) and Gypsy (1962)

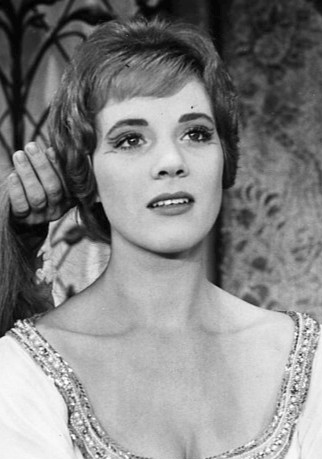
Julie Andrews won three times for Mary Poppins (1964), The Sound of Music (1965) and Victor/Victoria (1982)

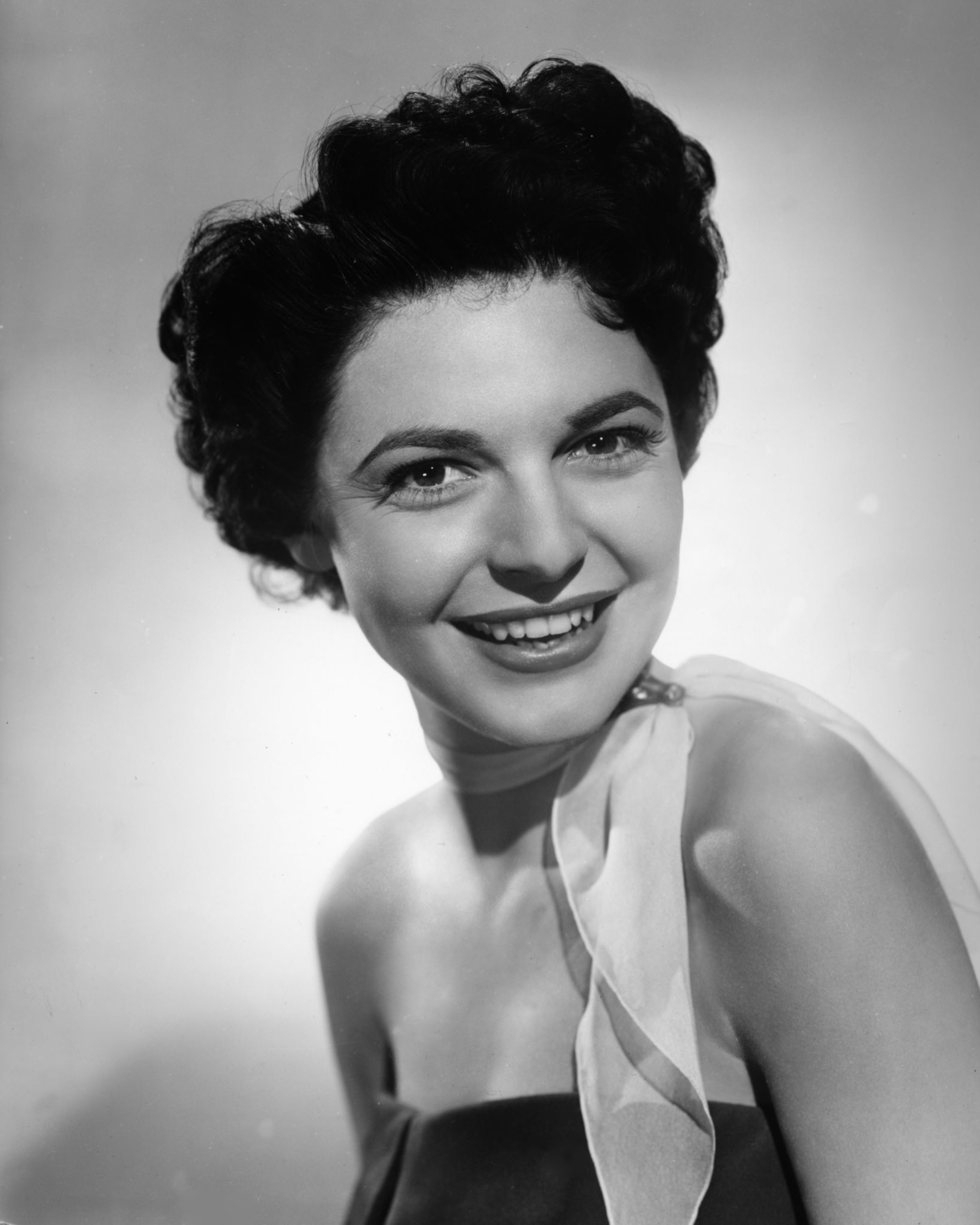
Anne Bancroft won for The Graduate (1967)

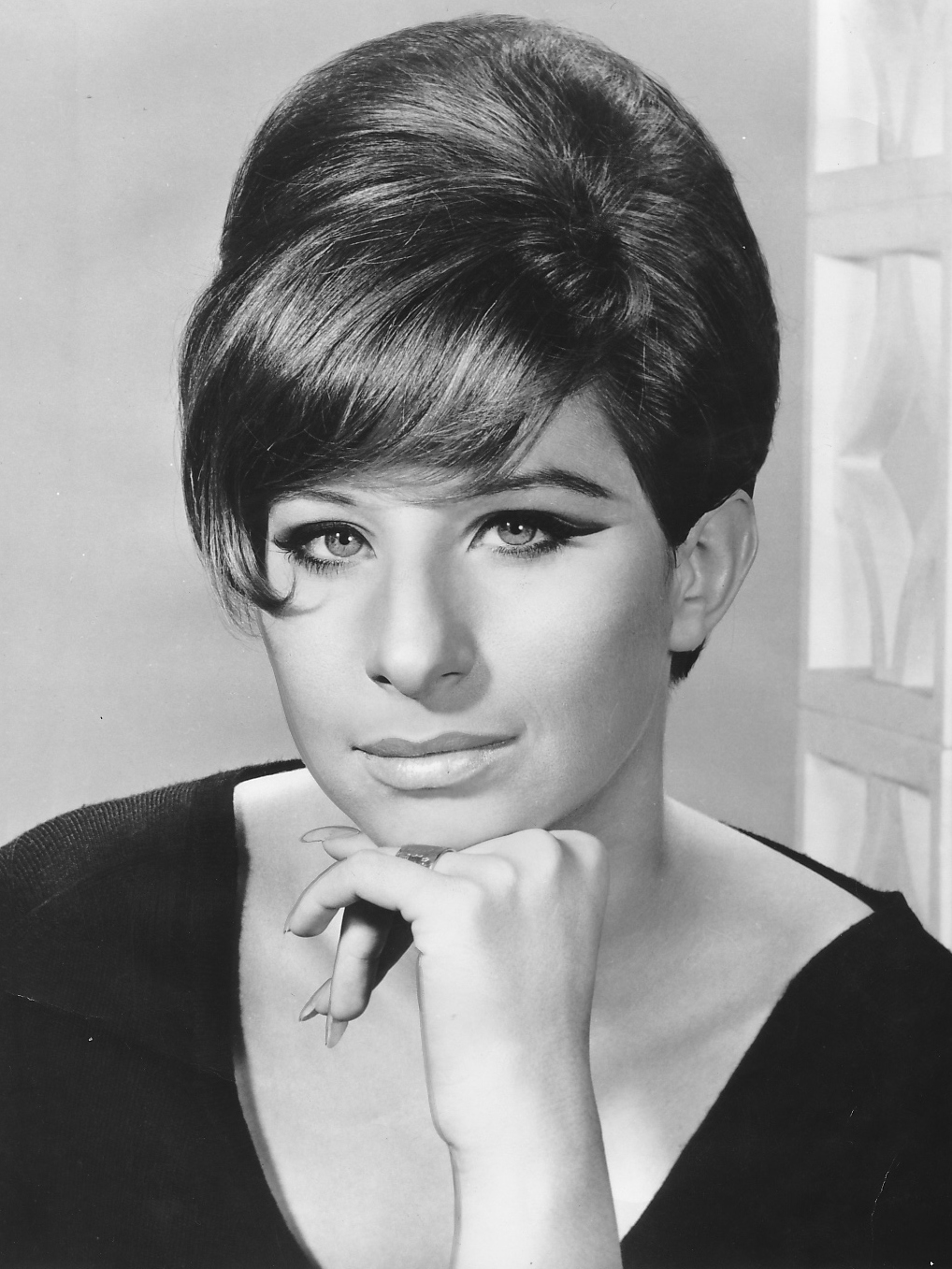
Barbra Streisand won twice for Funny Girl (1968) and A Star Is Born (1976)

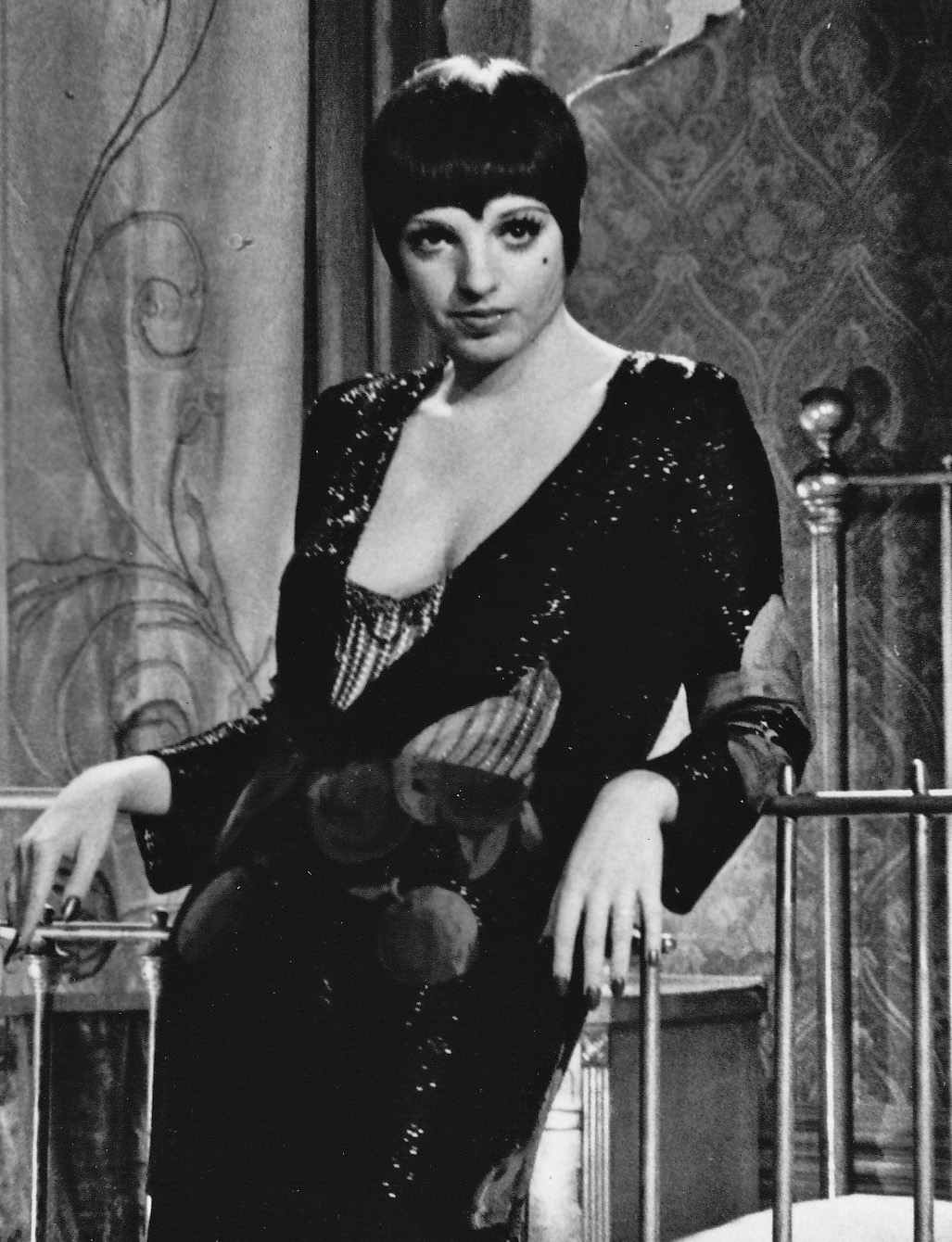
Liza Minnelli won for Cabaret (1972)

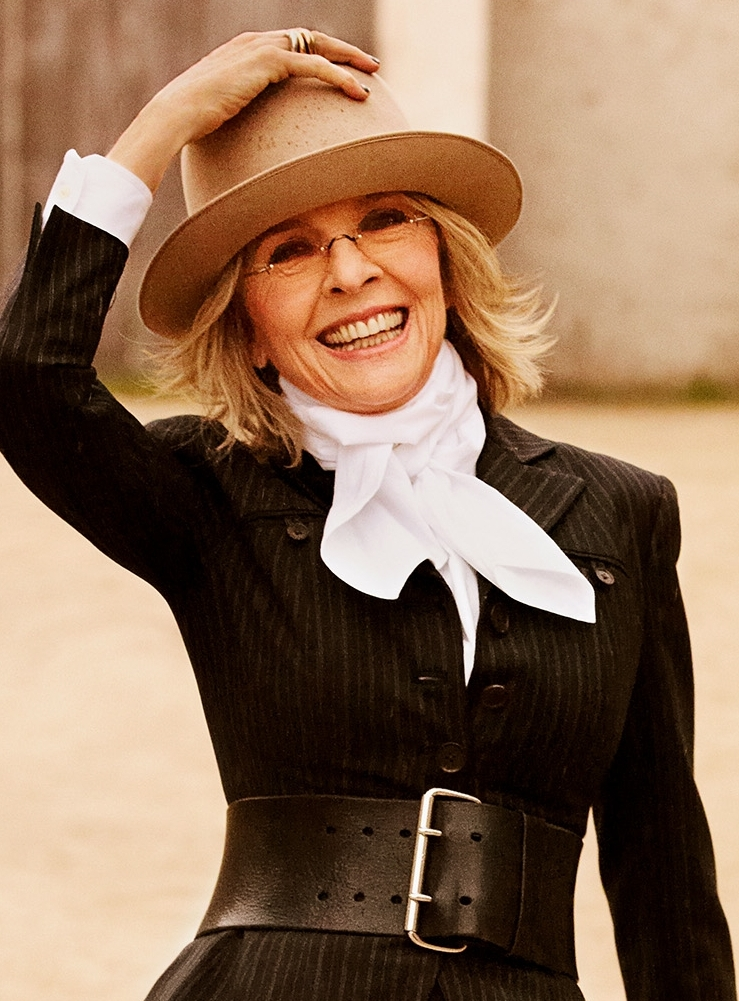
Diane Keaton won twice for Annie Hall (1977) and Something's Gotta Give (2003)

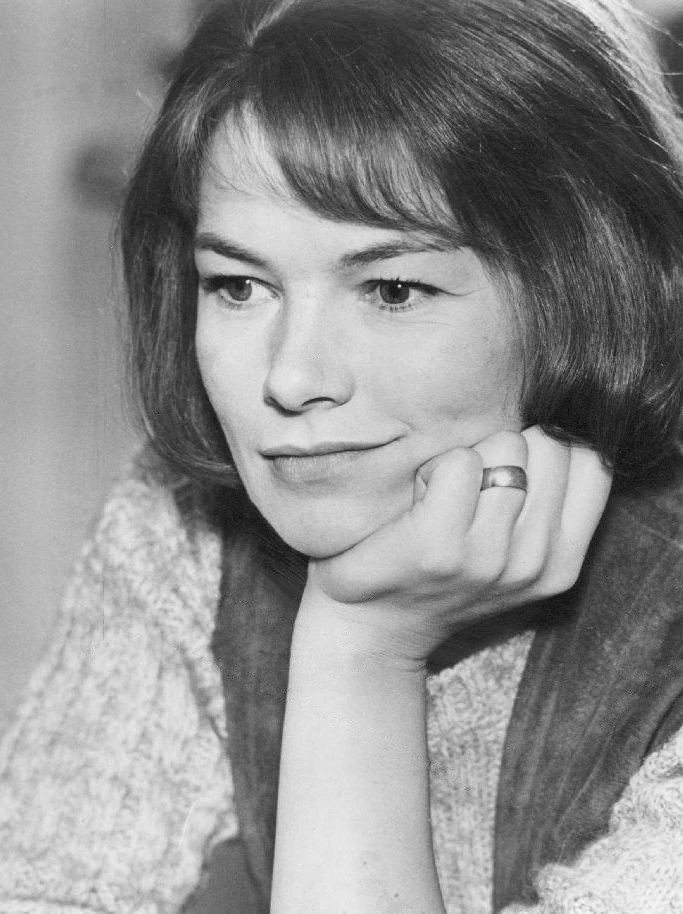
Glenda Jackson won for A Touch of Class (1973)

Ann-Margret won for Tommy (1975)

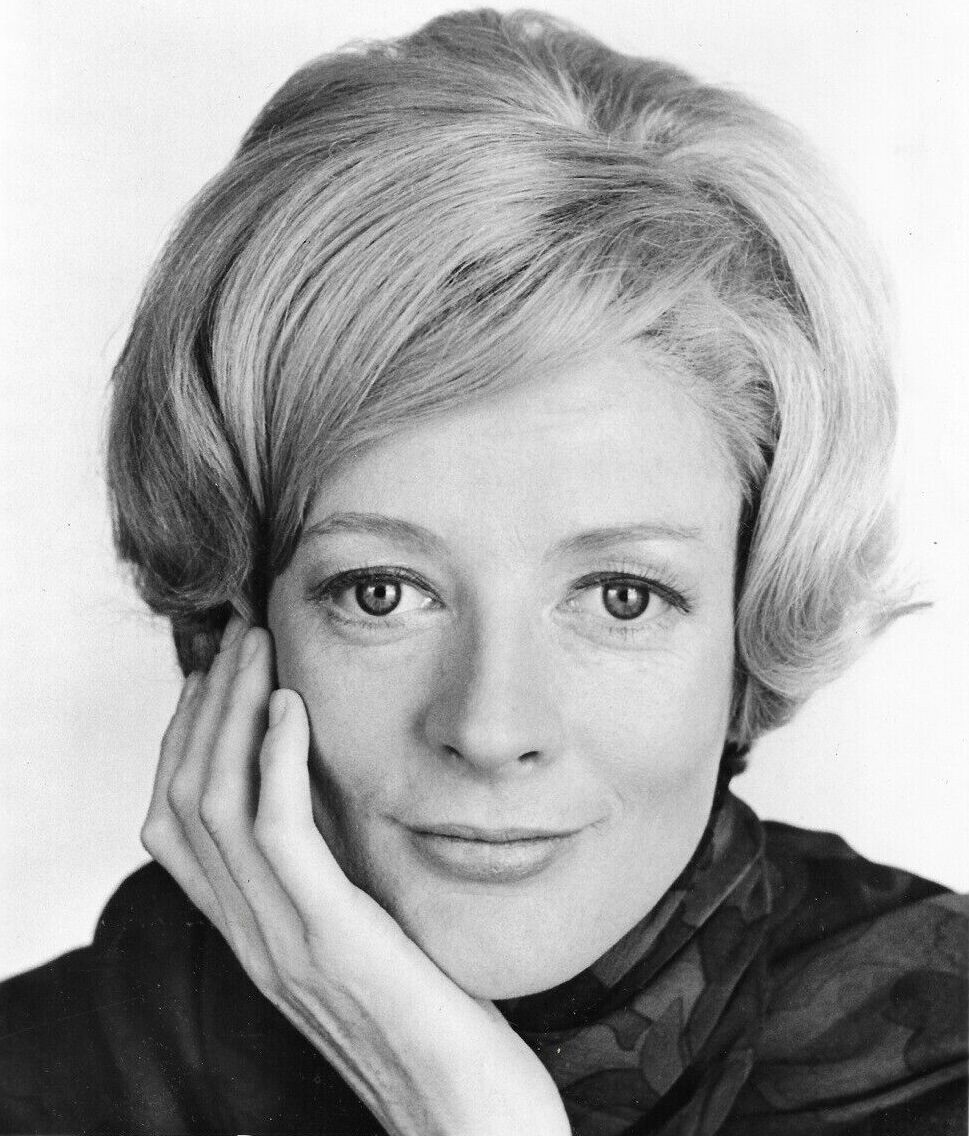
Maggie Smith won for California Suite (1978)

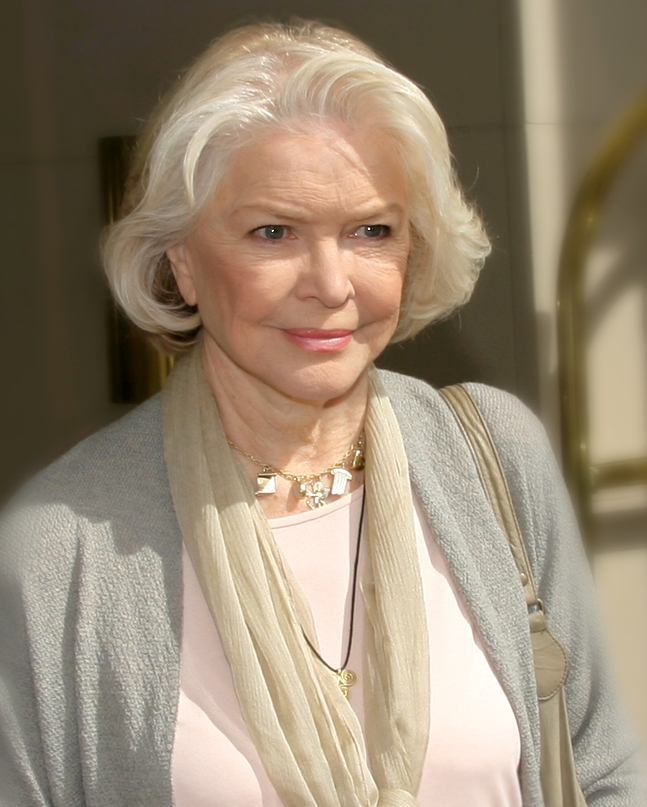
Ellen Burstyn won for Same Time, Next Year (1978)

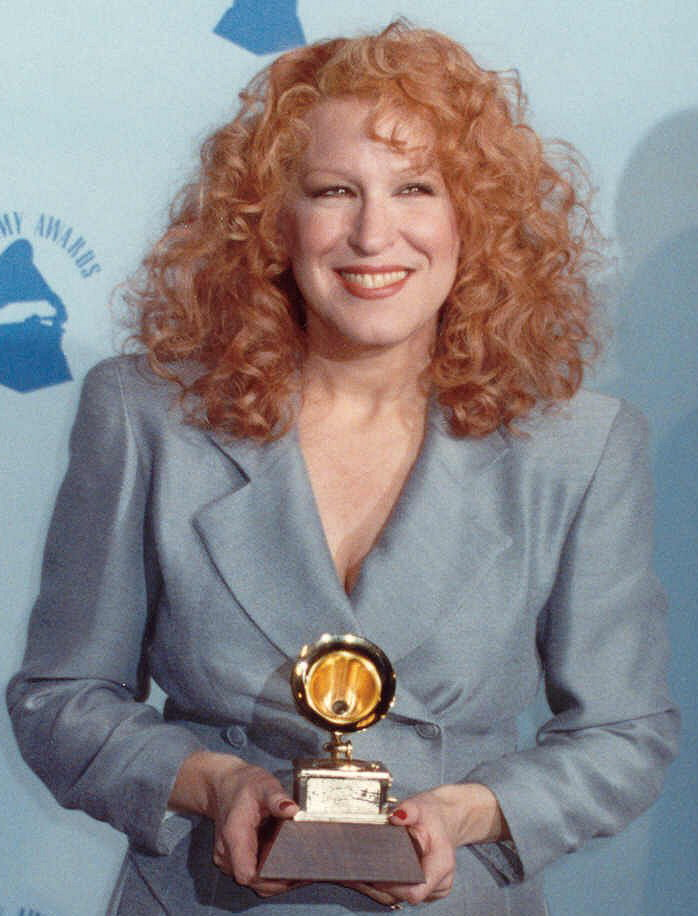
Bette Midler won twice for The Rose (1979) and For the Boys (1991)

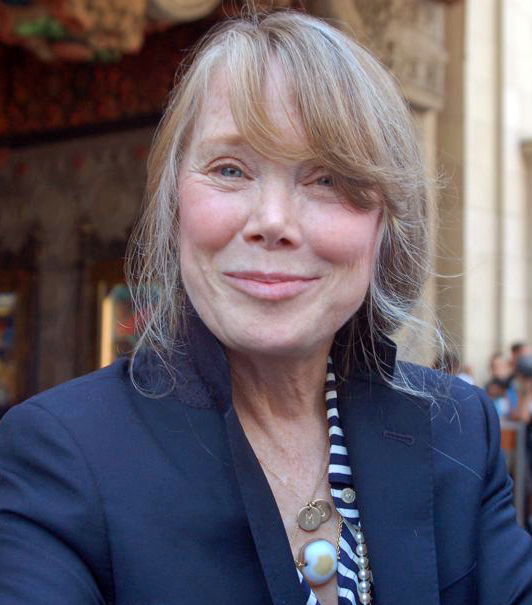
Sissy Spacek won twice for Coal Miner's Daughter (1980) and Crimes of the Heart (1986)

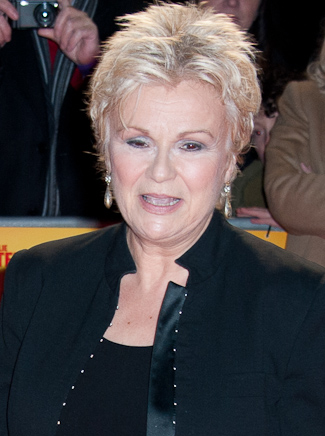
Julie Walters won for Educating Rita (1983)

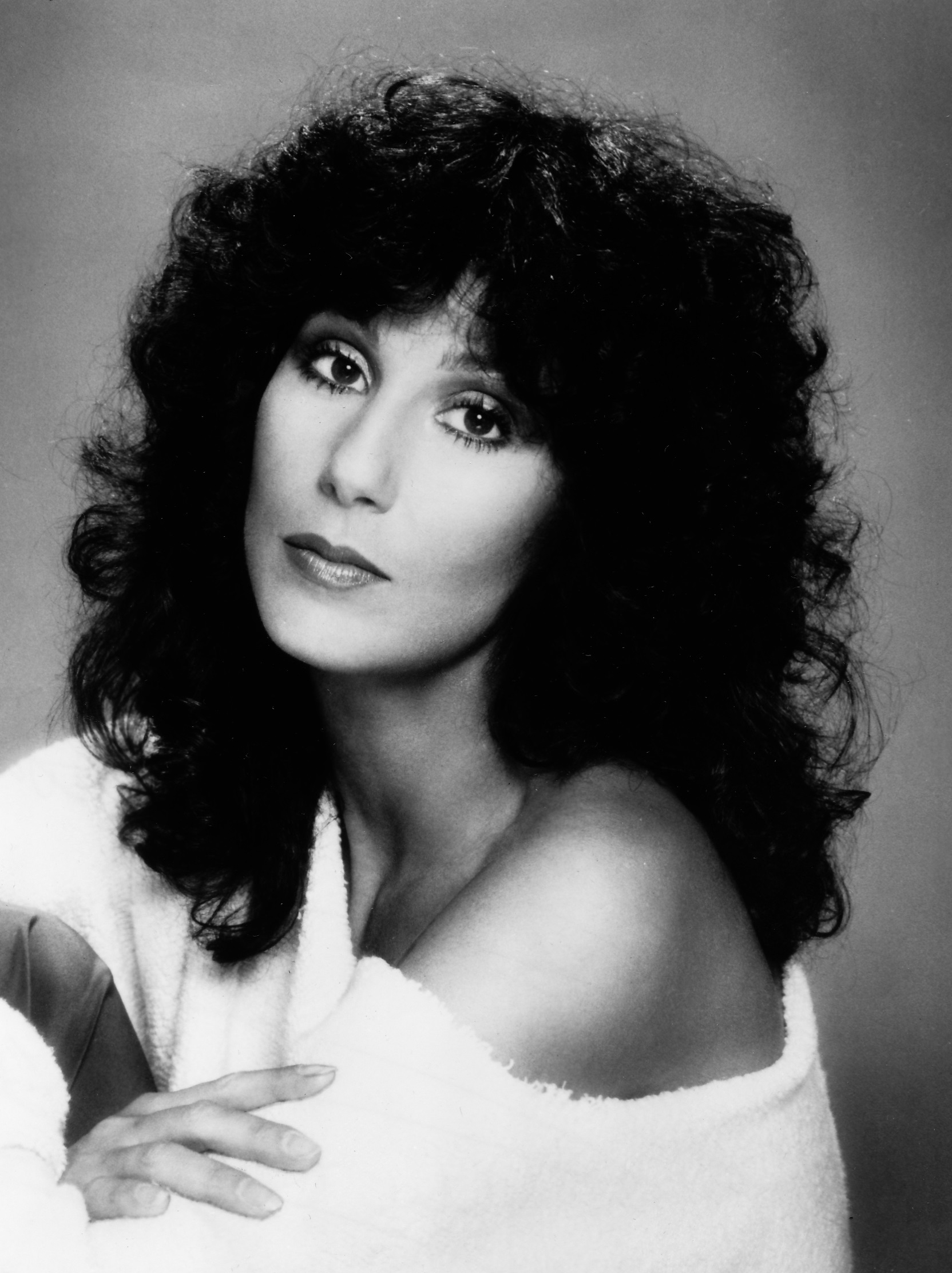
Cher won for Moonstruck (1987)

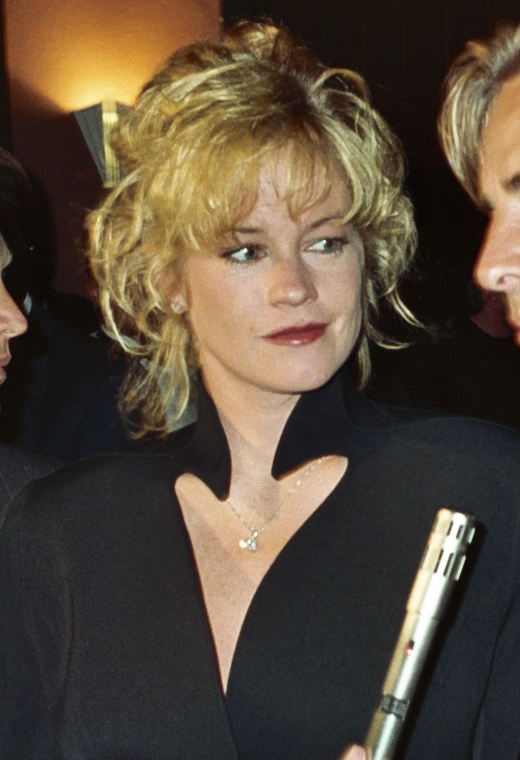
Melanie Griffith won for Working Girl (1988)

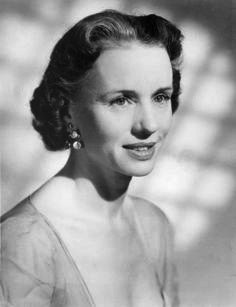
At age 80, Jessica Tandy became the oldest winner in this category for Driving Miss Daisy (1989)

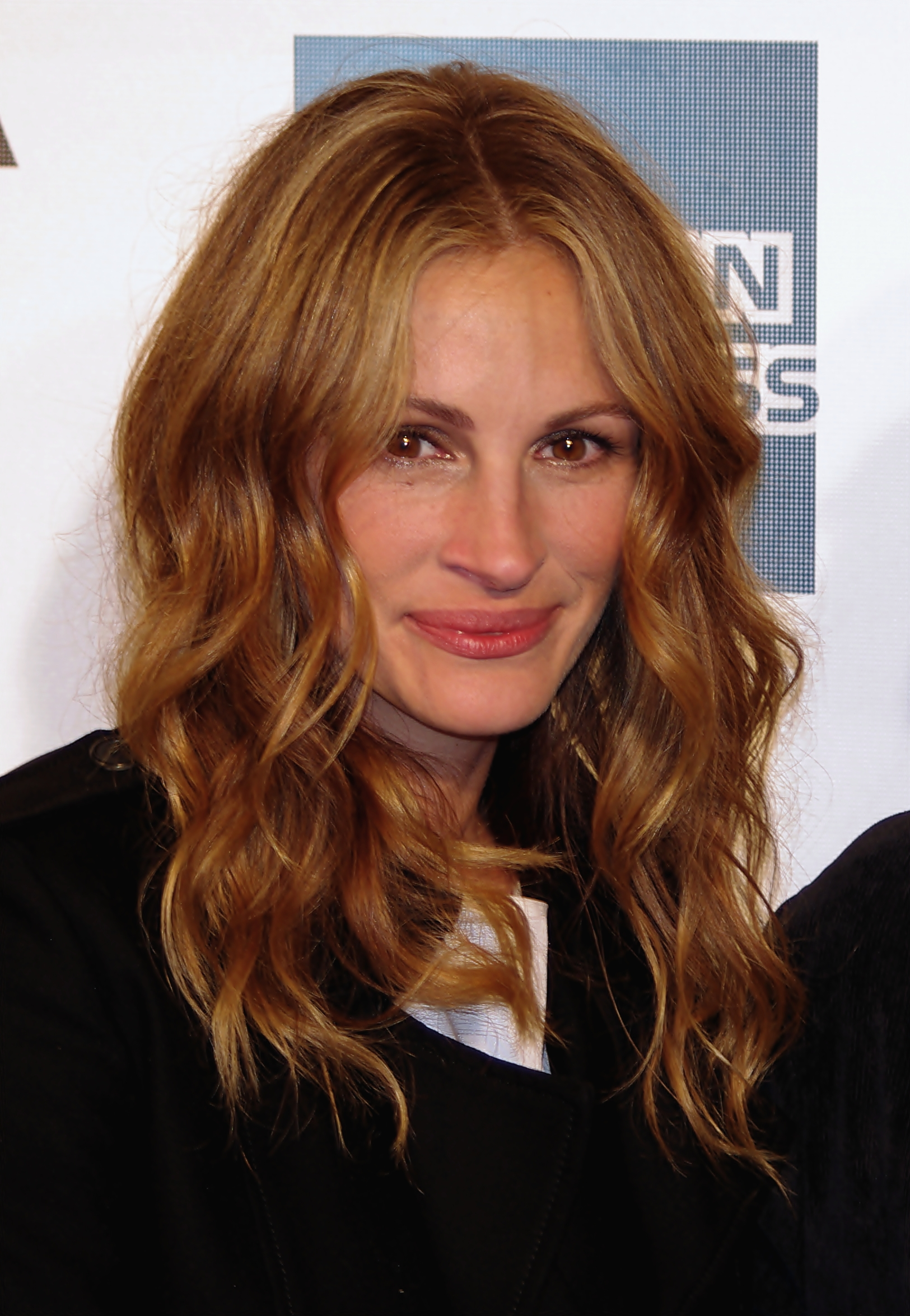
Julia Roberts won for Pretty Woman (1990)

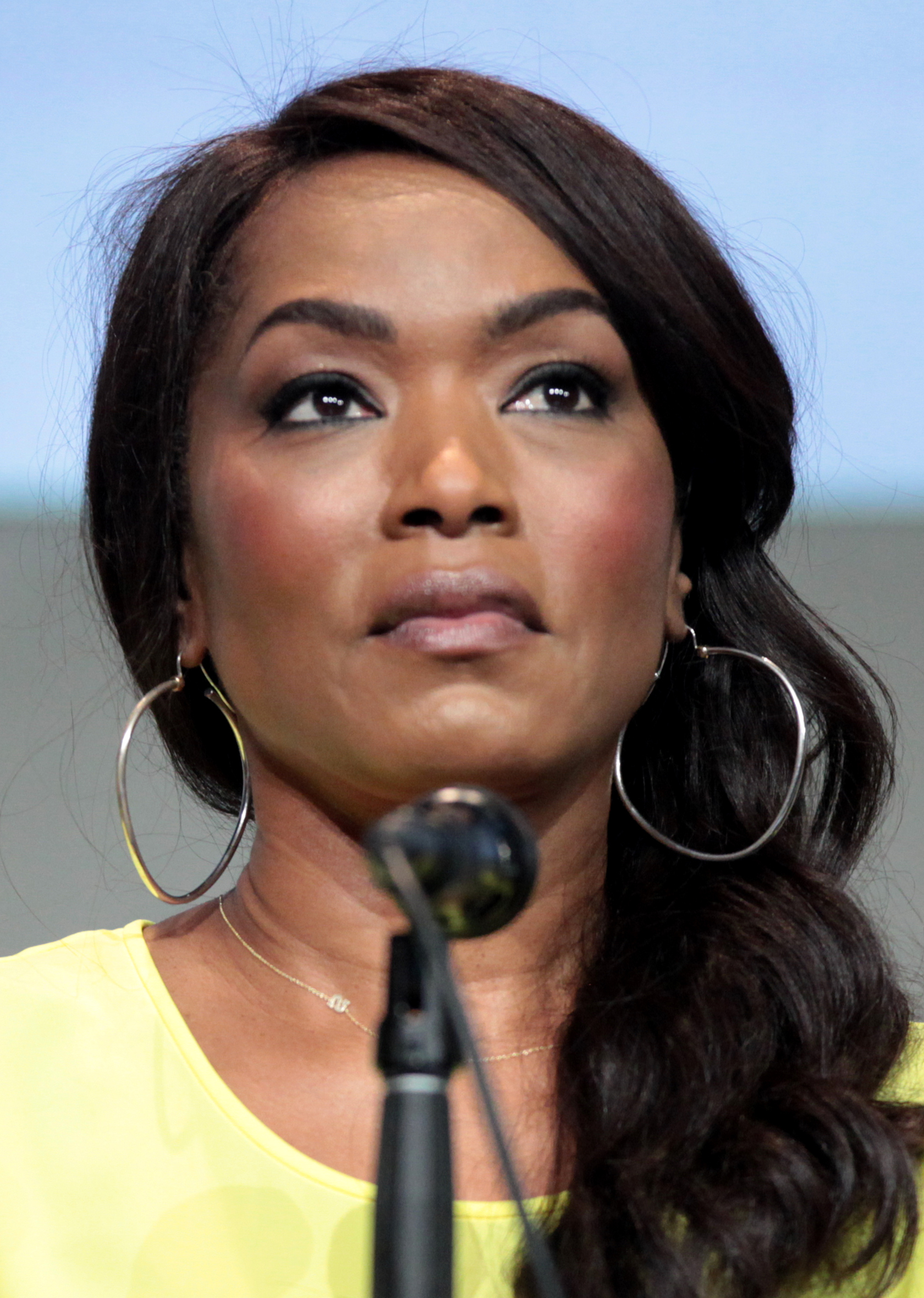
Angela Bassett won for Tina Turner in What's Love Got to Do with It (1993)

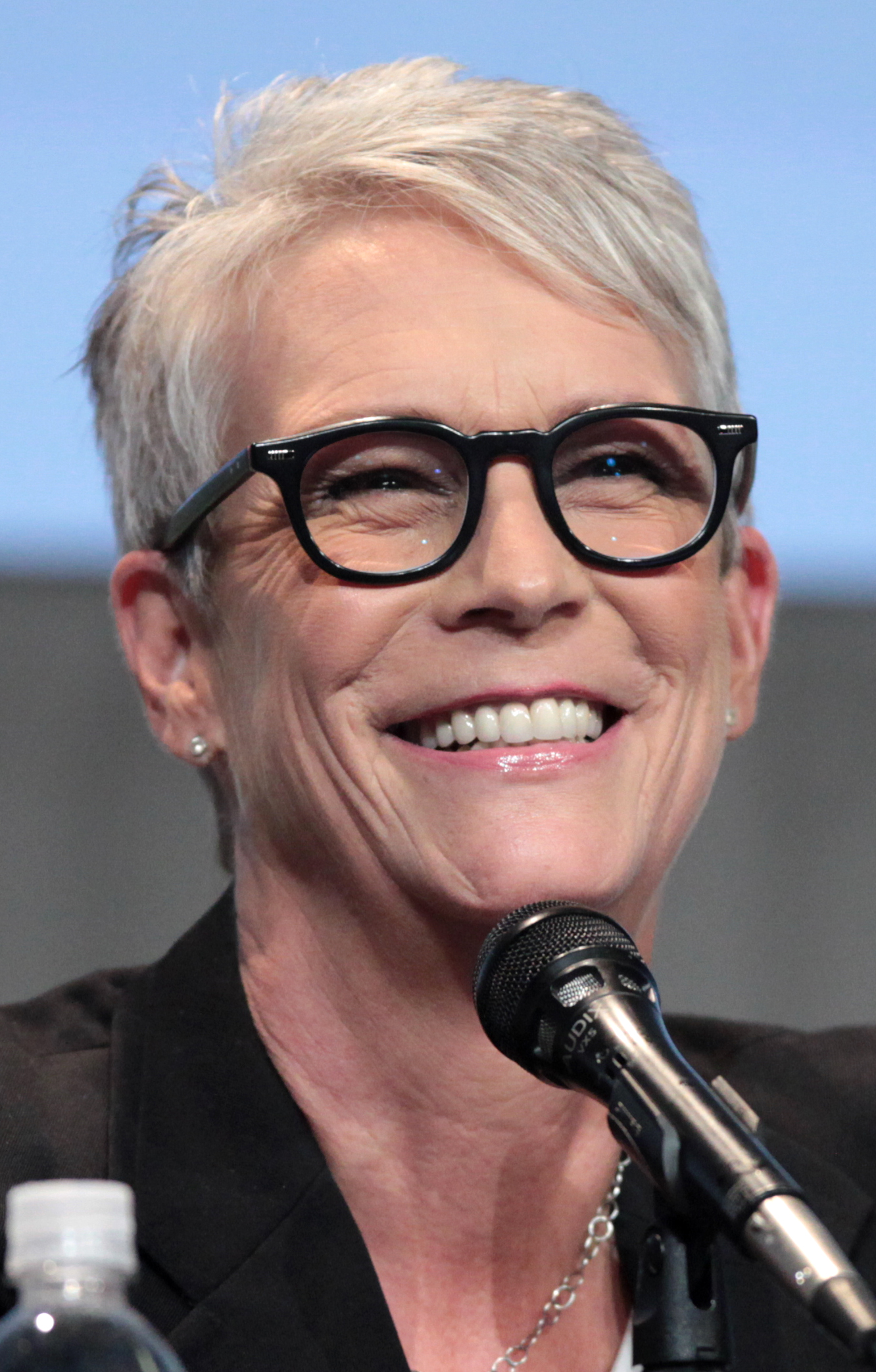
Jamie Lee Curtis won for True Lies (1994)

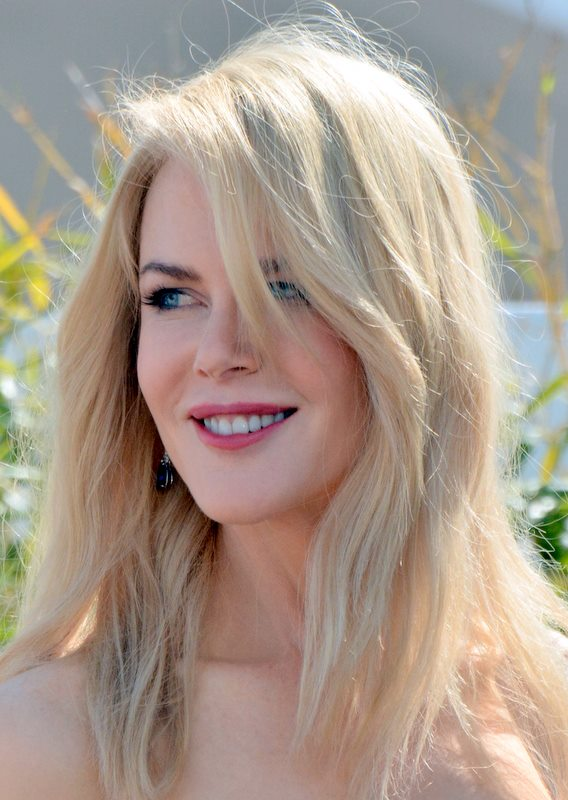
Nicole Kidman won twice for To Die For (1995) and Moulin Rouge! (2001)

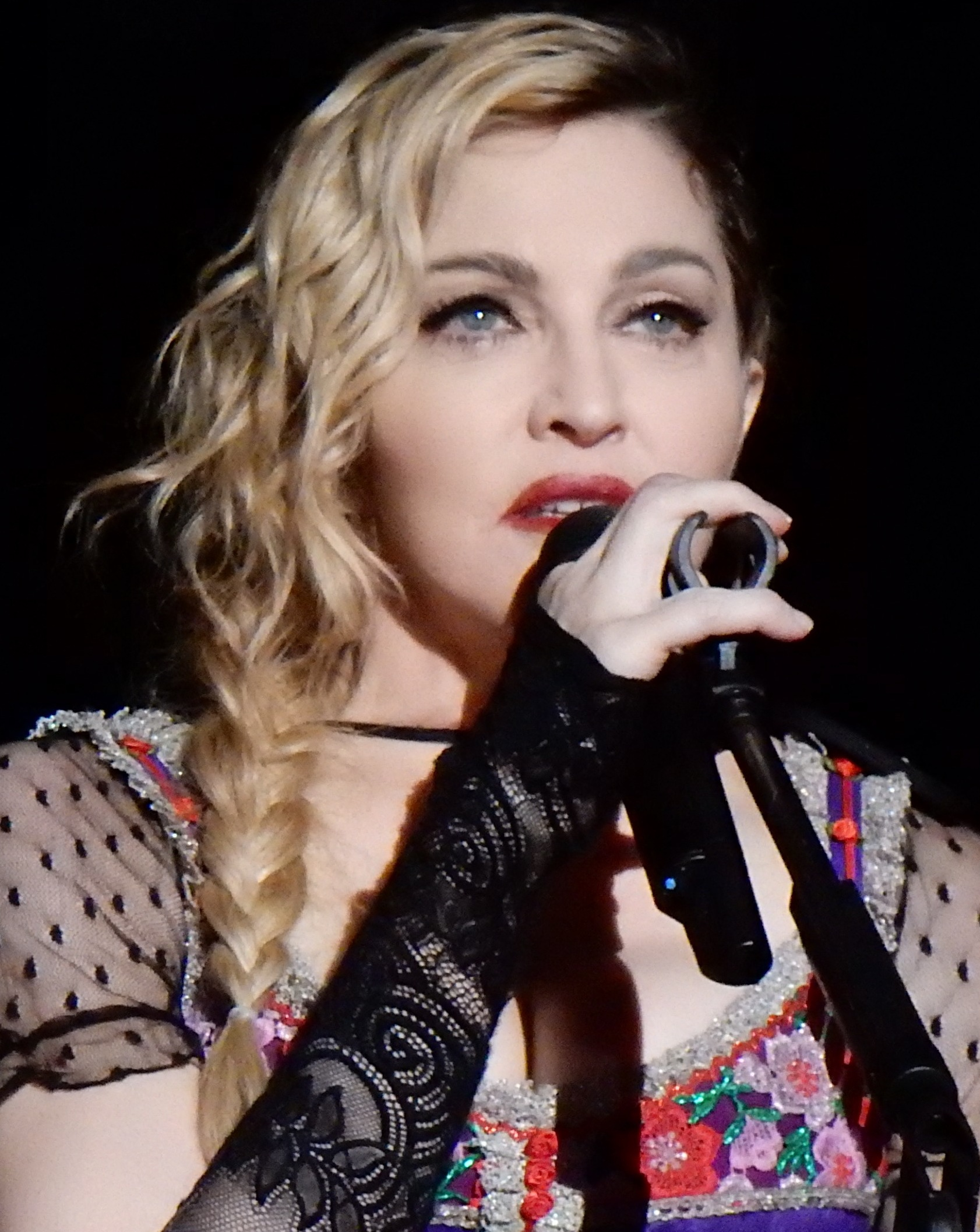
Madonna won for playing Eva Perón in Evita (1996)

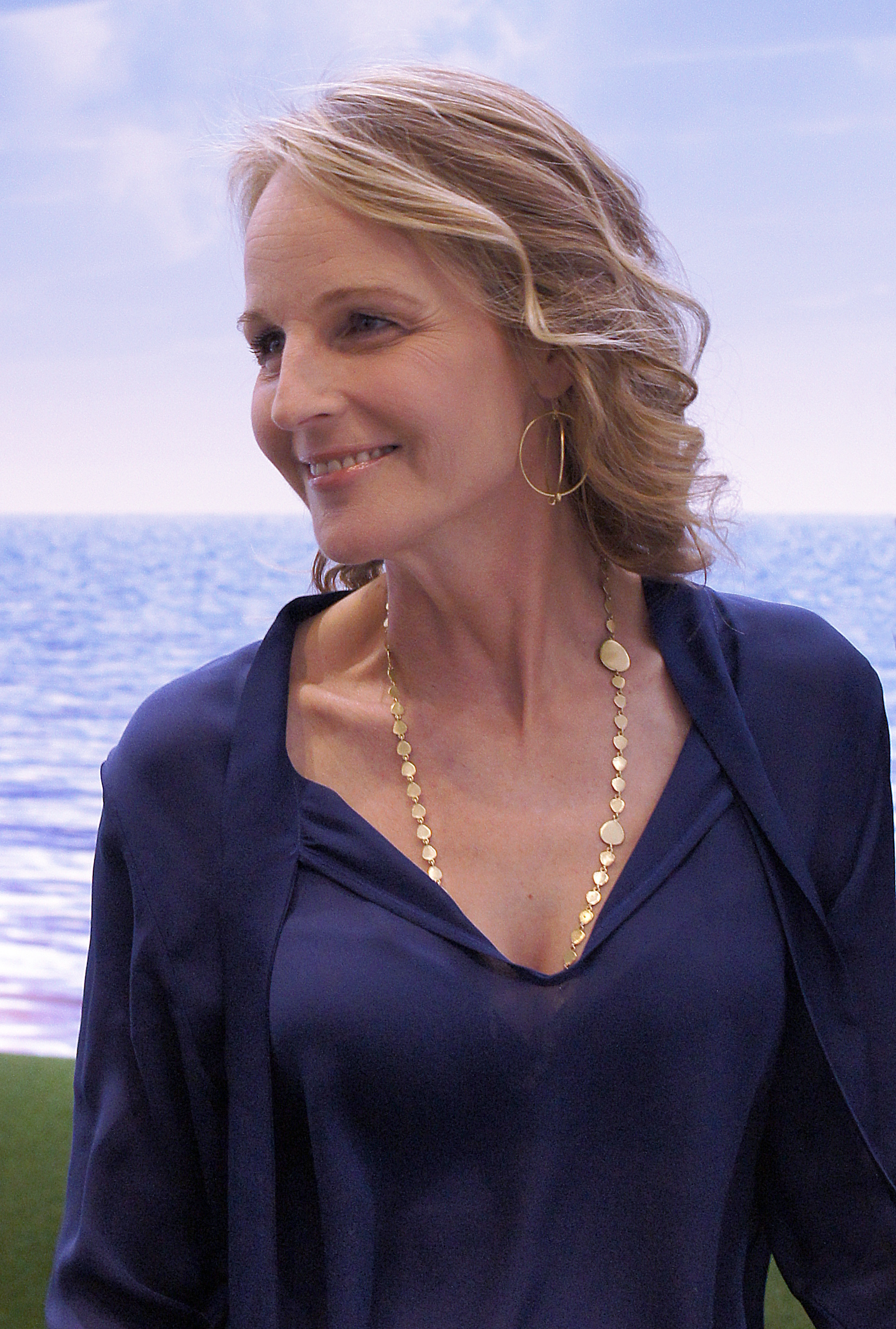
Helen Hunt won for As Good as It Gets (1997)

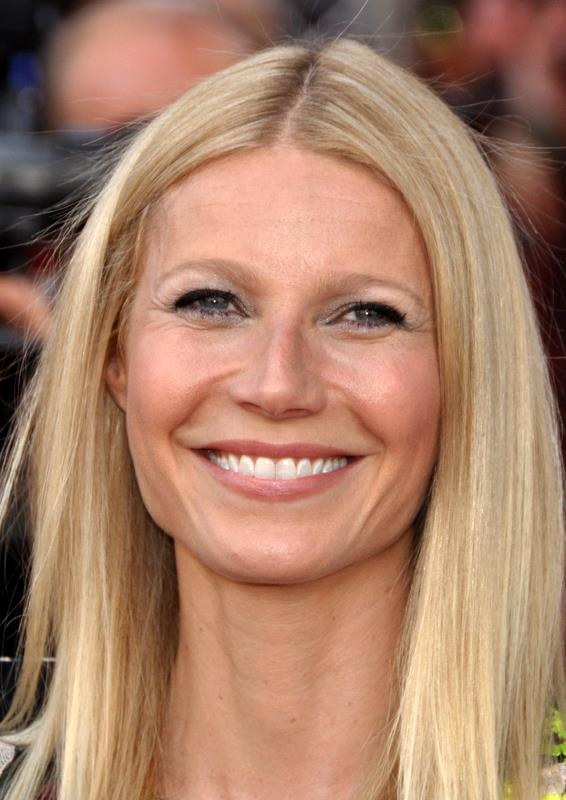
Gwyneth Paltrow won for Shakespeare in Love (1998)

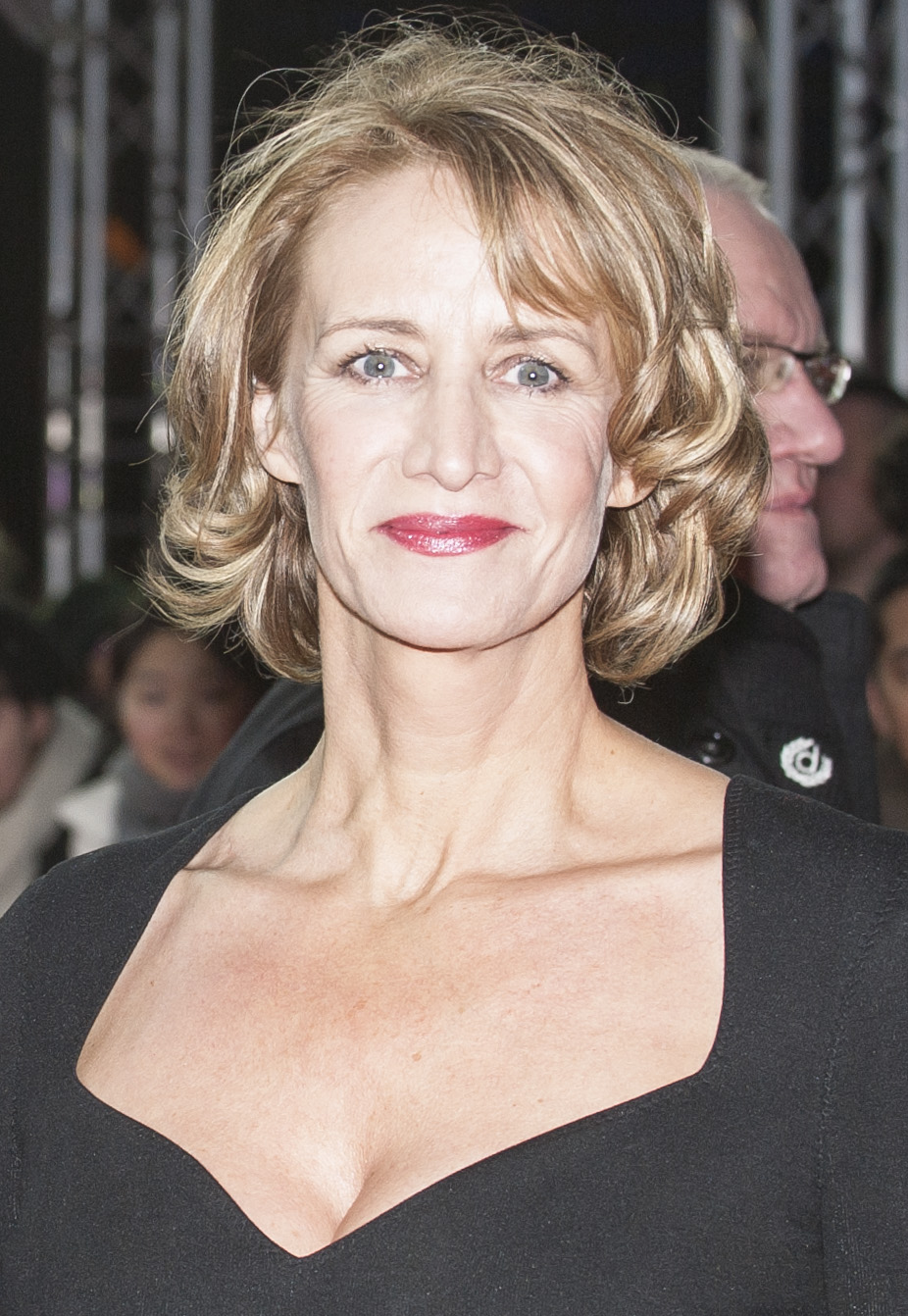
Janet McTeer won for Tumbleweeds (1999)

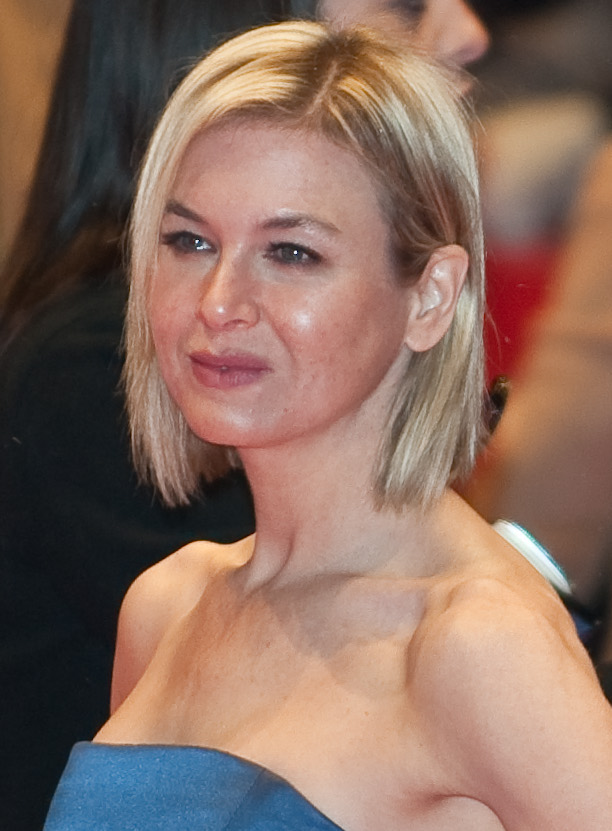
Renée Zellweger won twice for Nurse Betty (2000) and Chicago (2002)

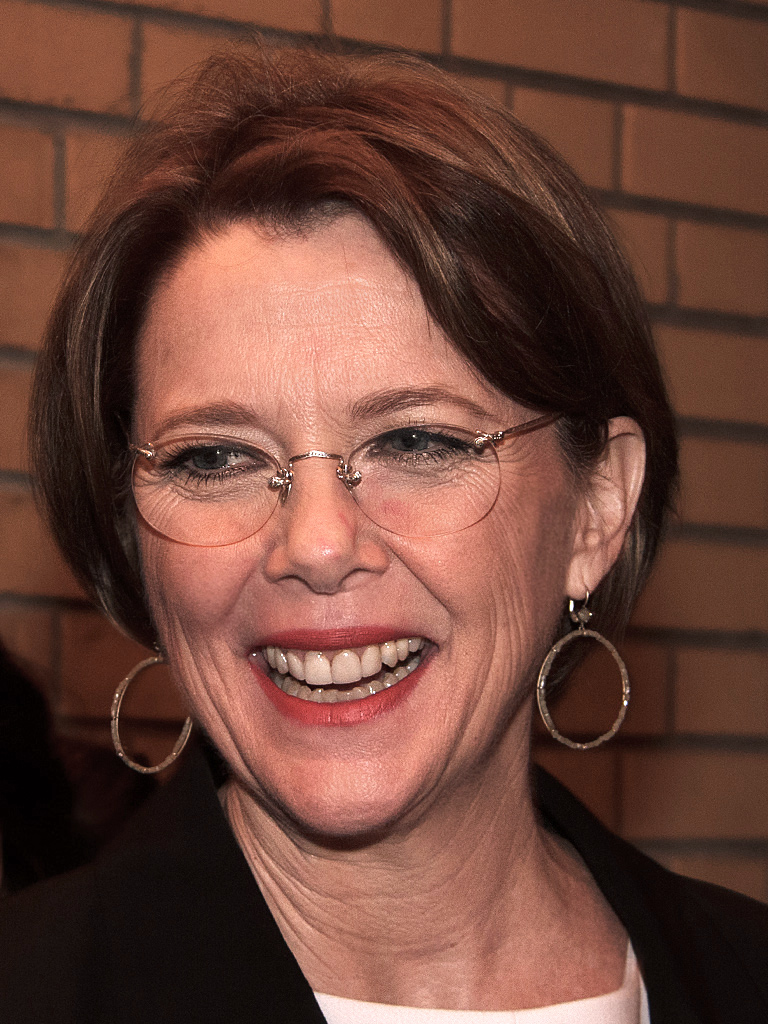
Annette Bening won twice for her Being Julia (2004) and The Kids Are All Right (2010)

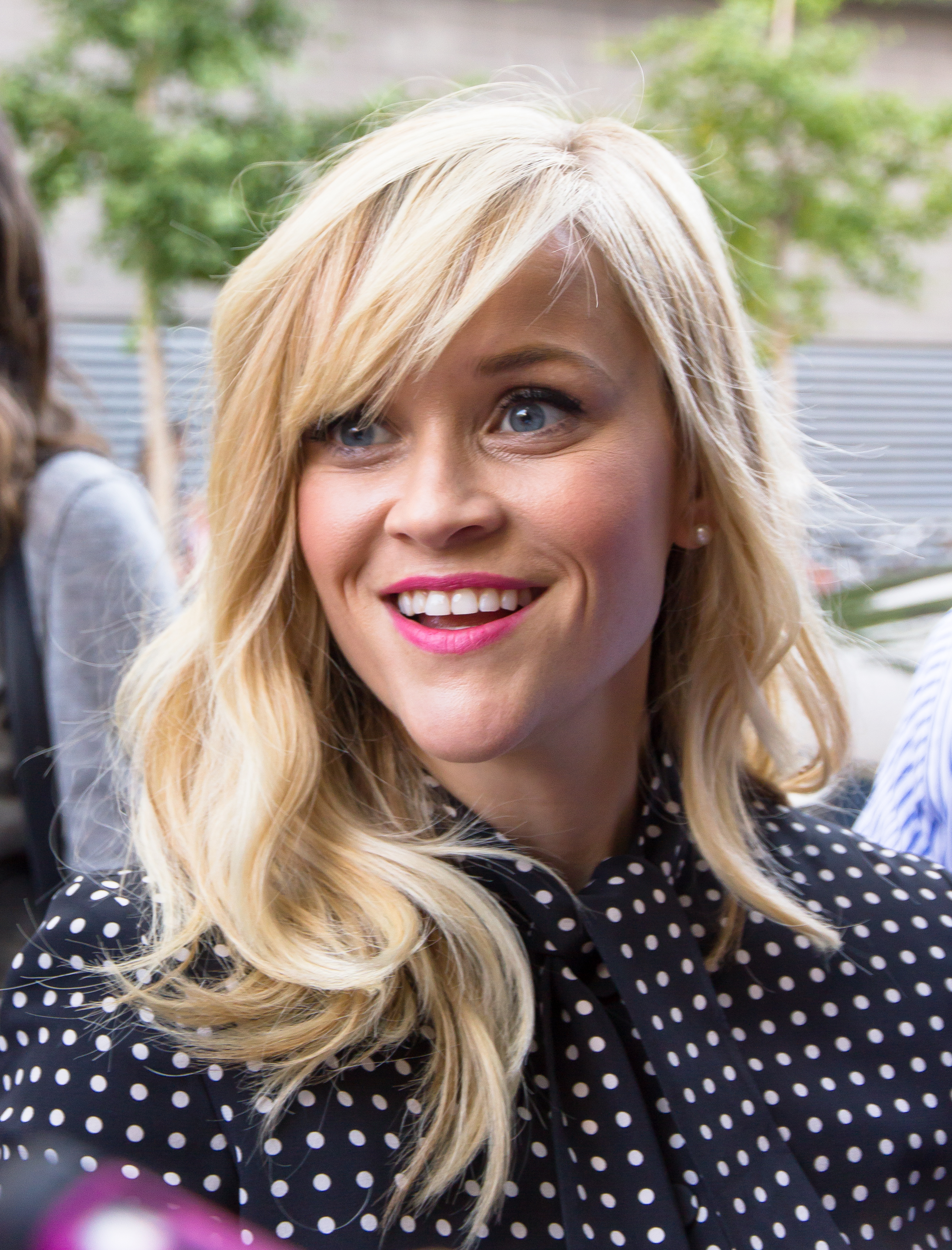
Reese Witherspoon won playing June Carter Cash in Walk the Line (2005)

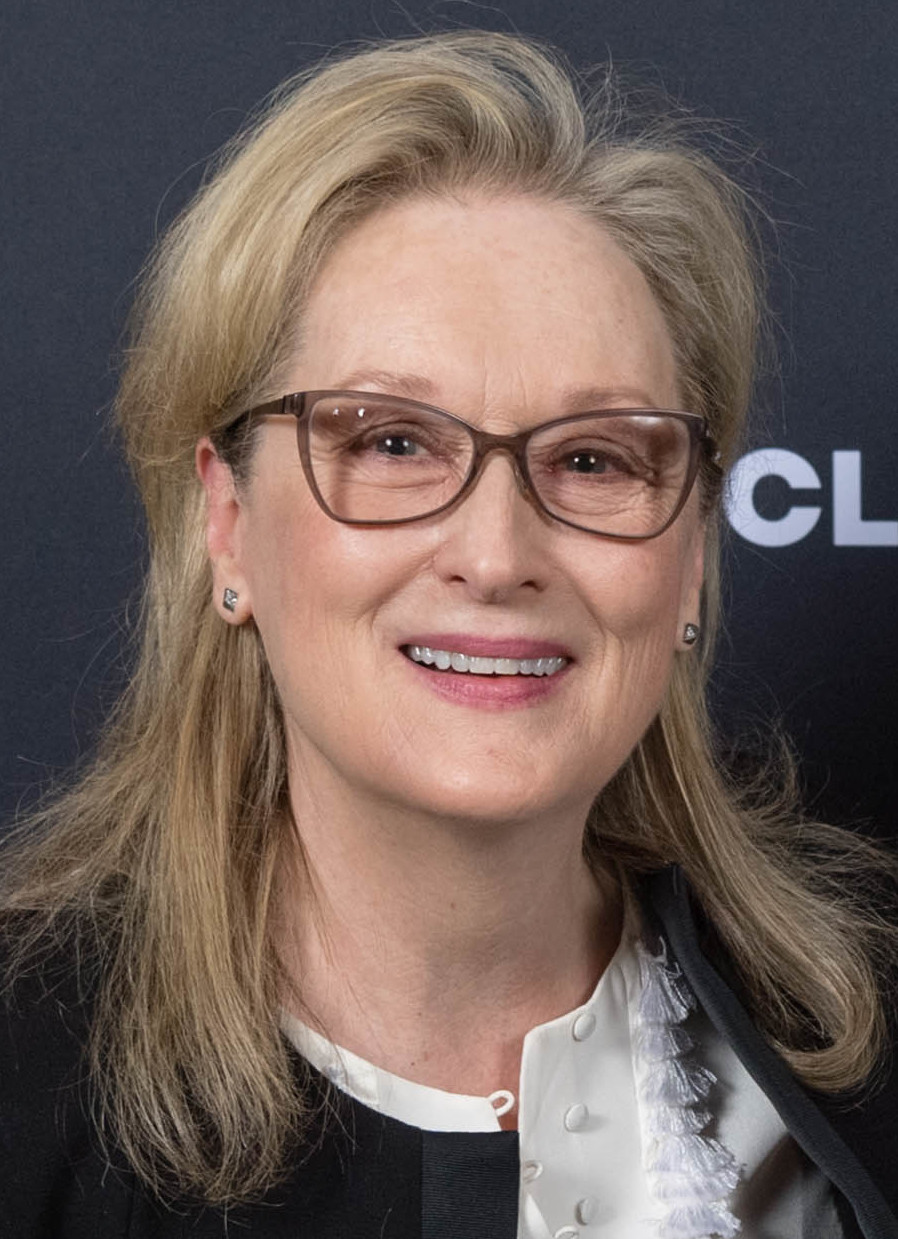
Meryl Streep won twice for her roles in The Devil Wears Prada (2006) and Julie & Julia (2009)

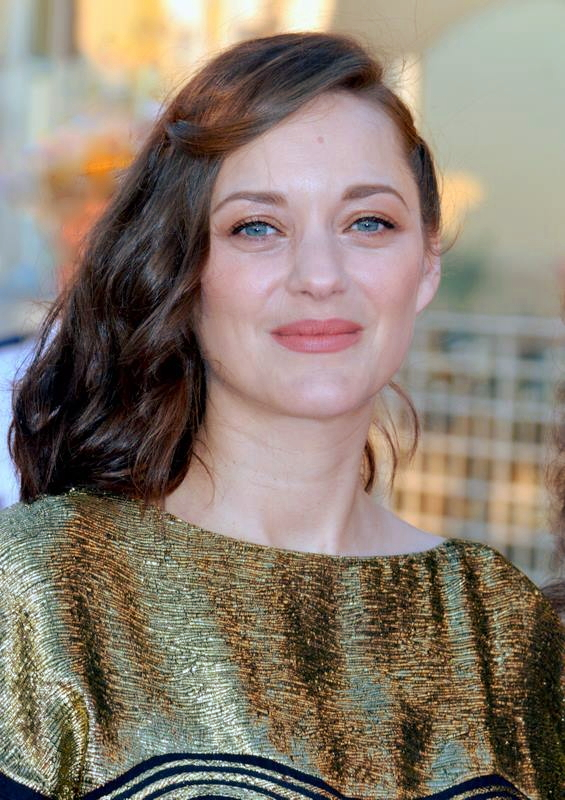
Marion Cotillard won for playing Édith Piaf in La Vie en Rose (2007)

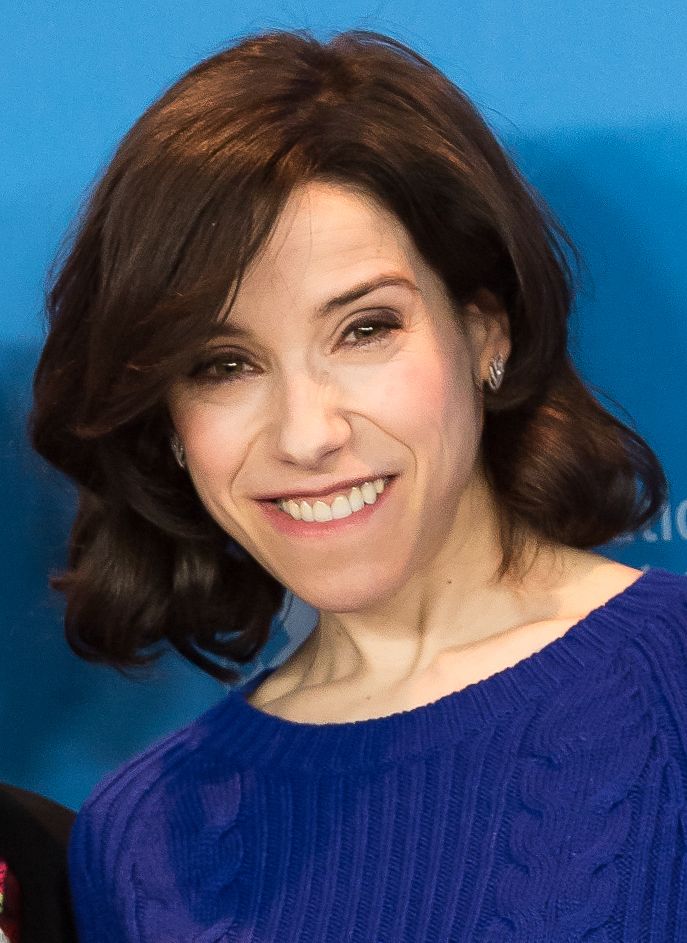
Sally Hawkins won for Happy-Go-Lucky (2008)

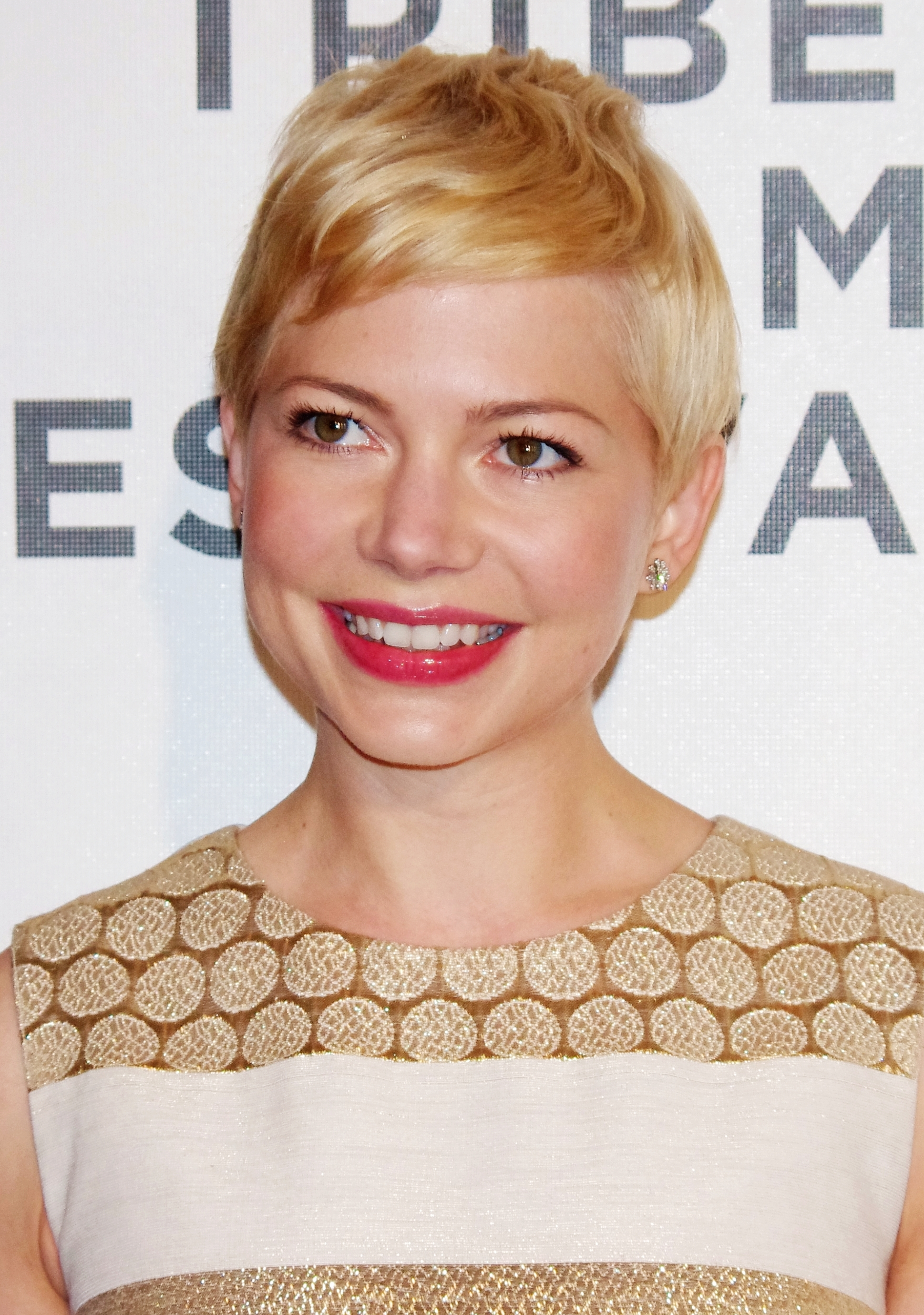
Michelle Williams won for playing Marilyn Monroe in My Week with Marilyn (2011)

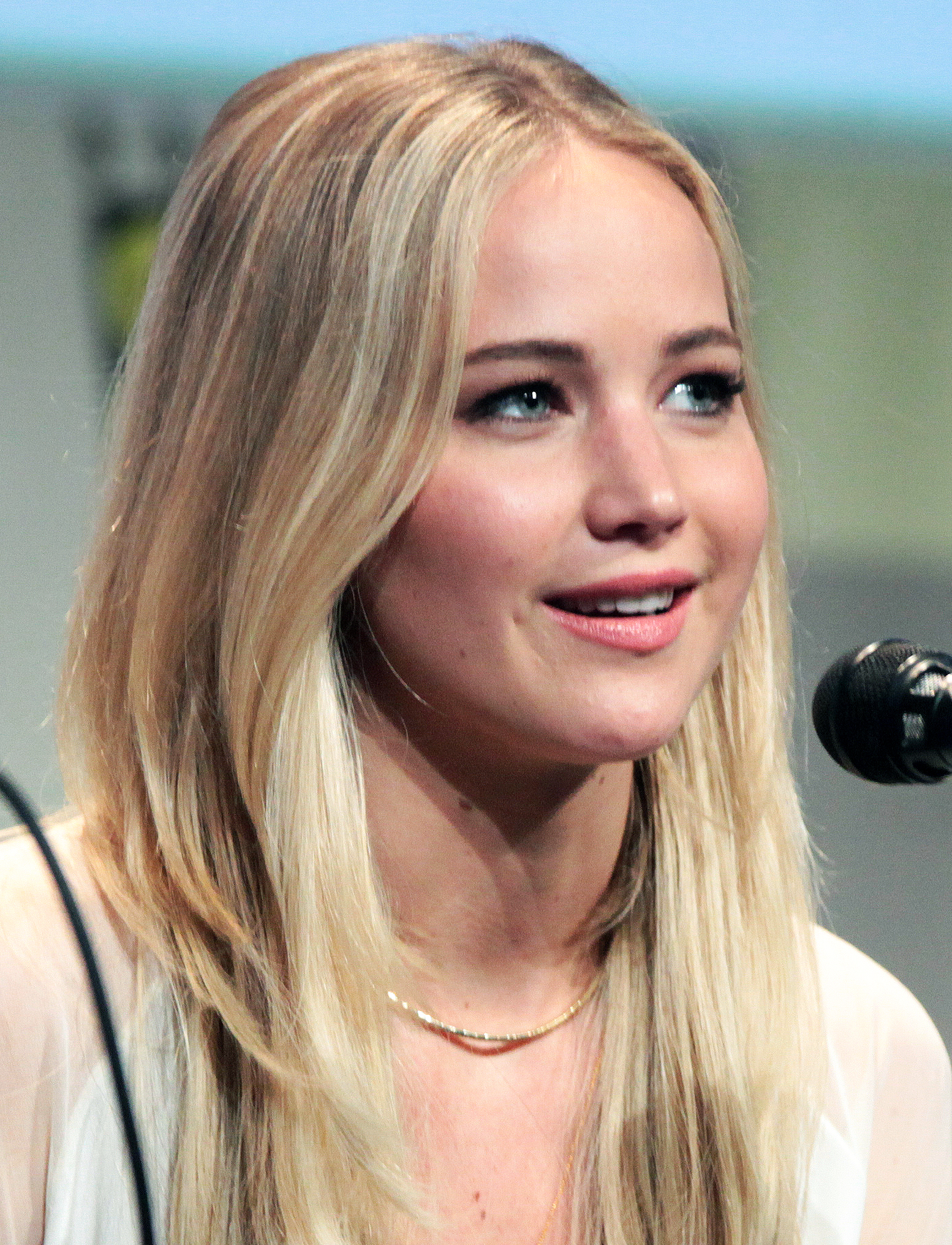
Jennifer Lawrence won twice for Silver Linings Playbook (2012) and for Joy (2015)

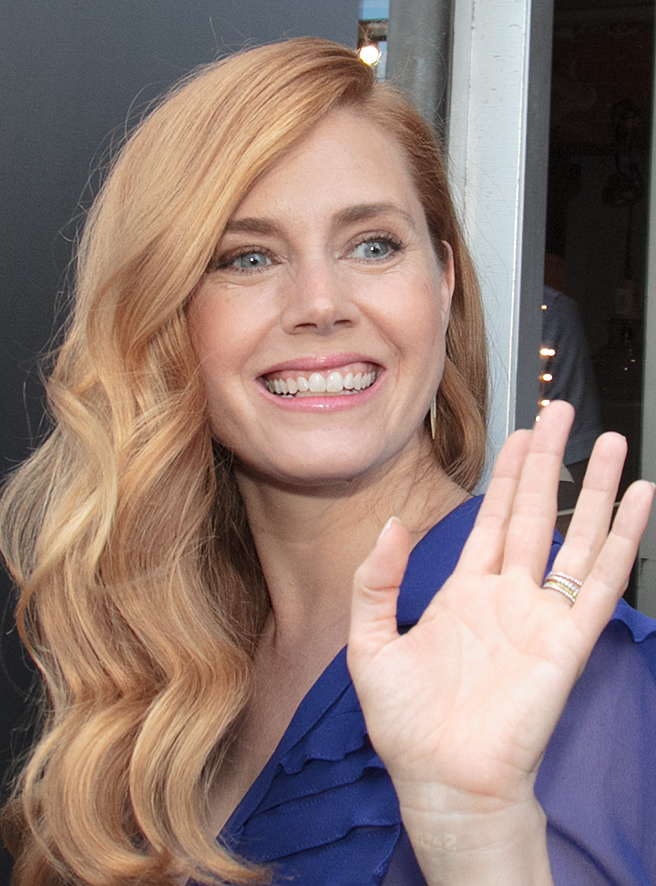
Amy Adams won twice for American Hustle (2013) and Big Eyes (2014)

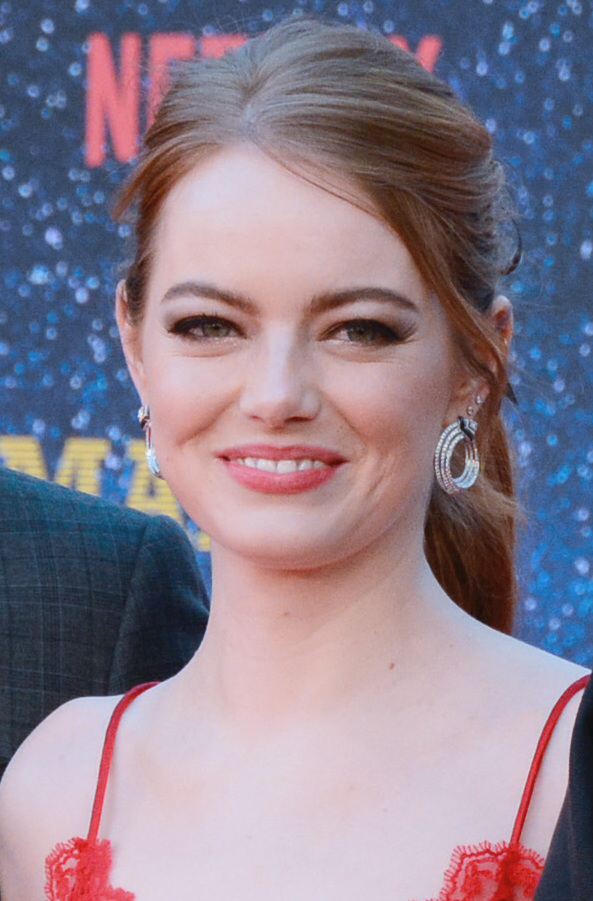
Emma Stone won twice for La La Land (2016) and Poor Things (2023)

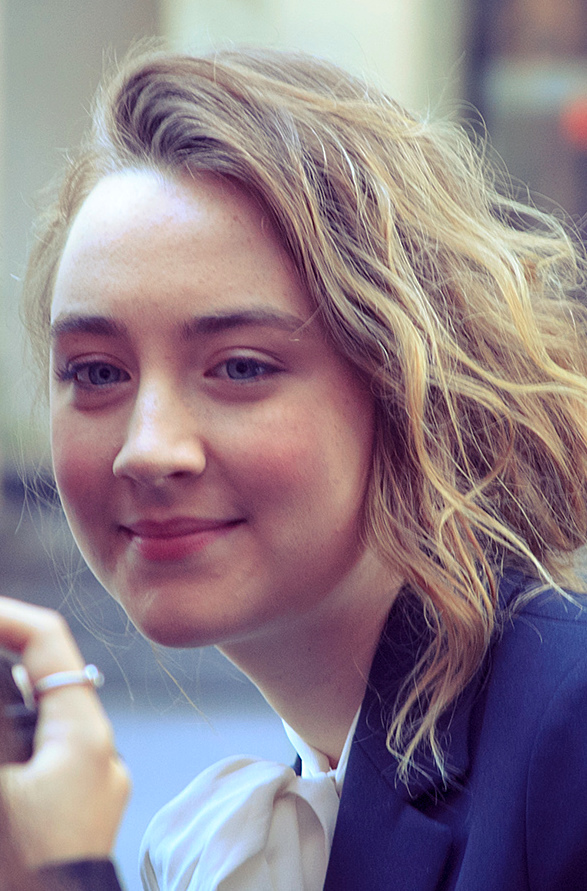
Saoirse Ronan won for Lady Bird (2017)

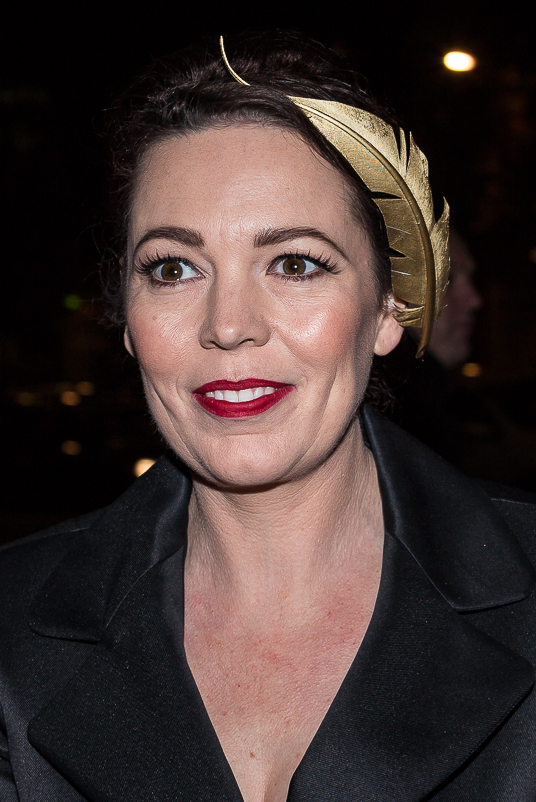
Olivia Colman won for The Favourite (2018)

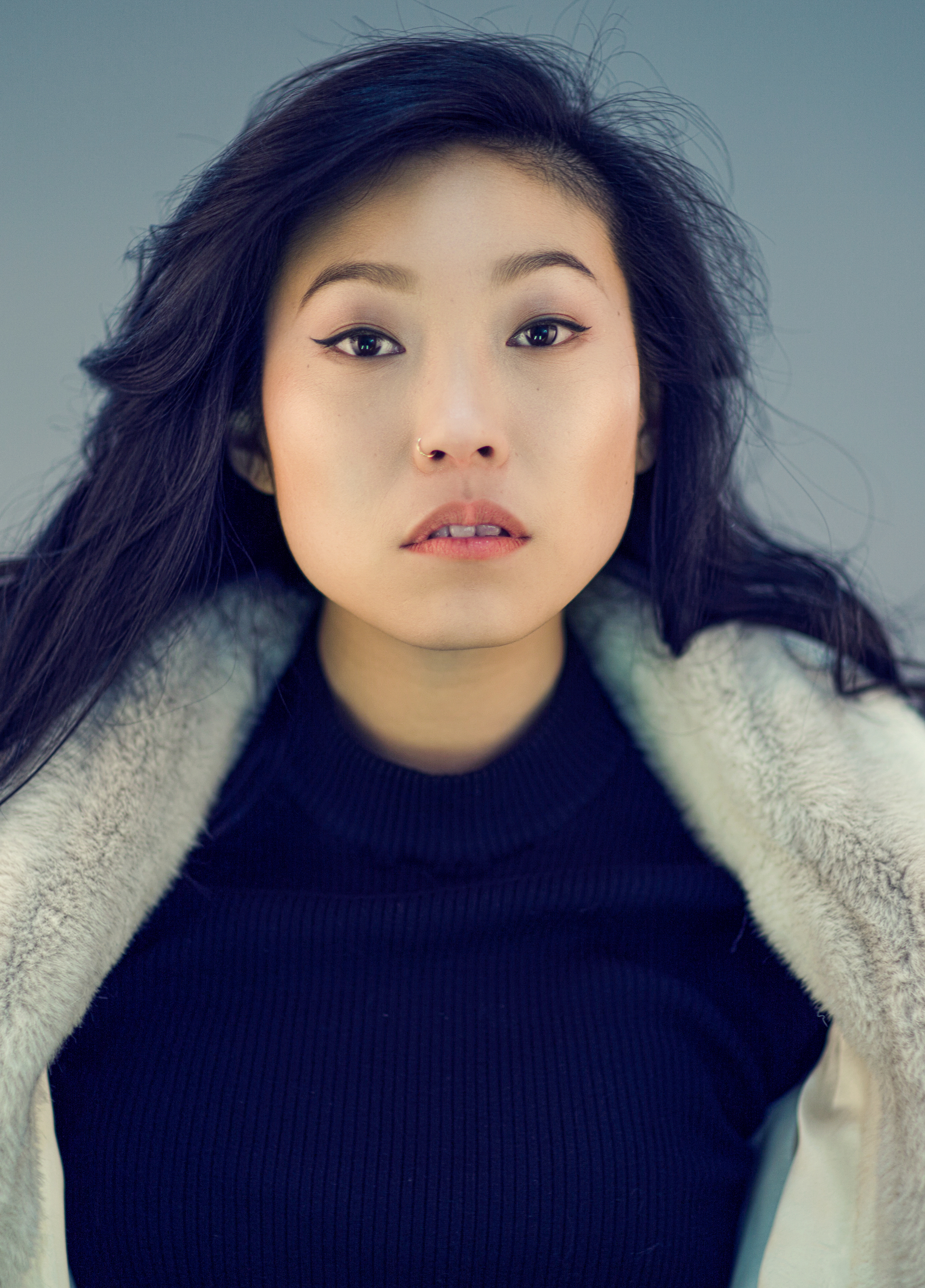
Awkwafina won for The Farewell (2019)

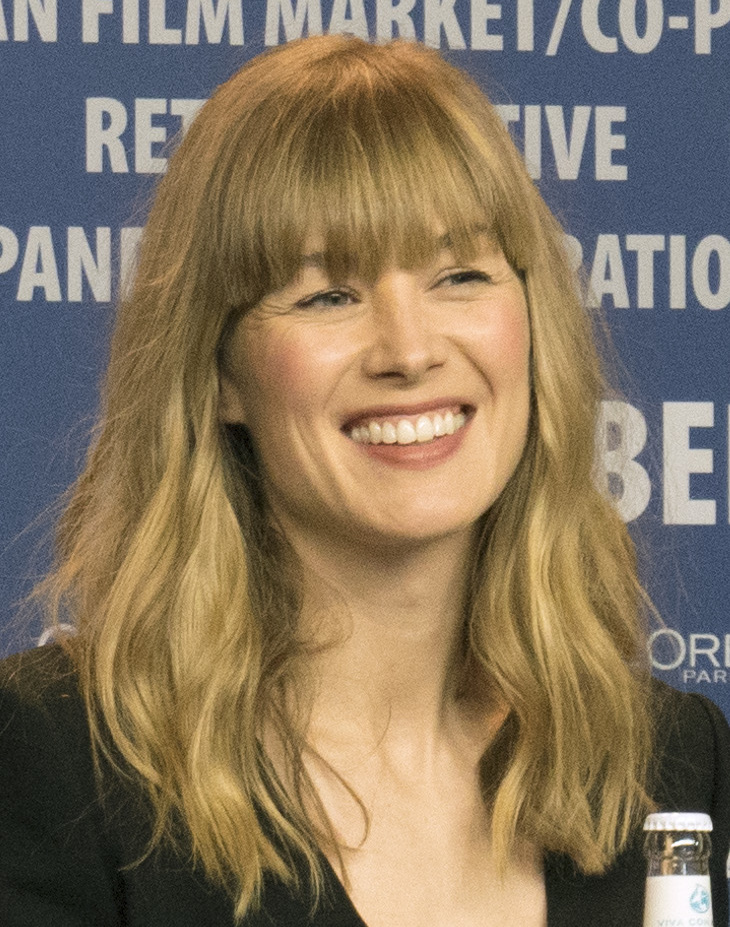
Rosamund Pike won for I Care a Lot (2020)

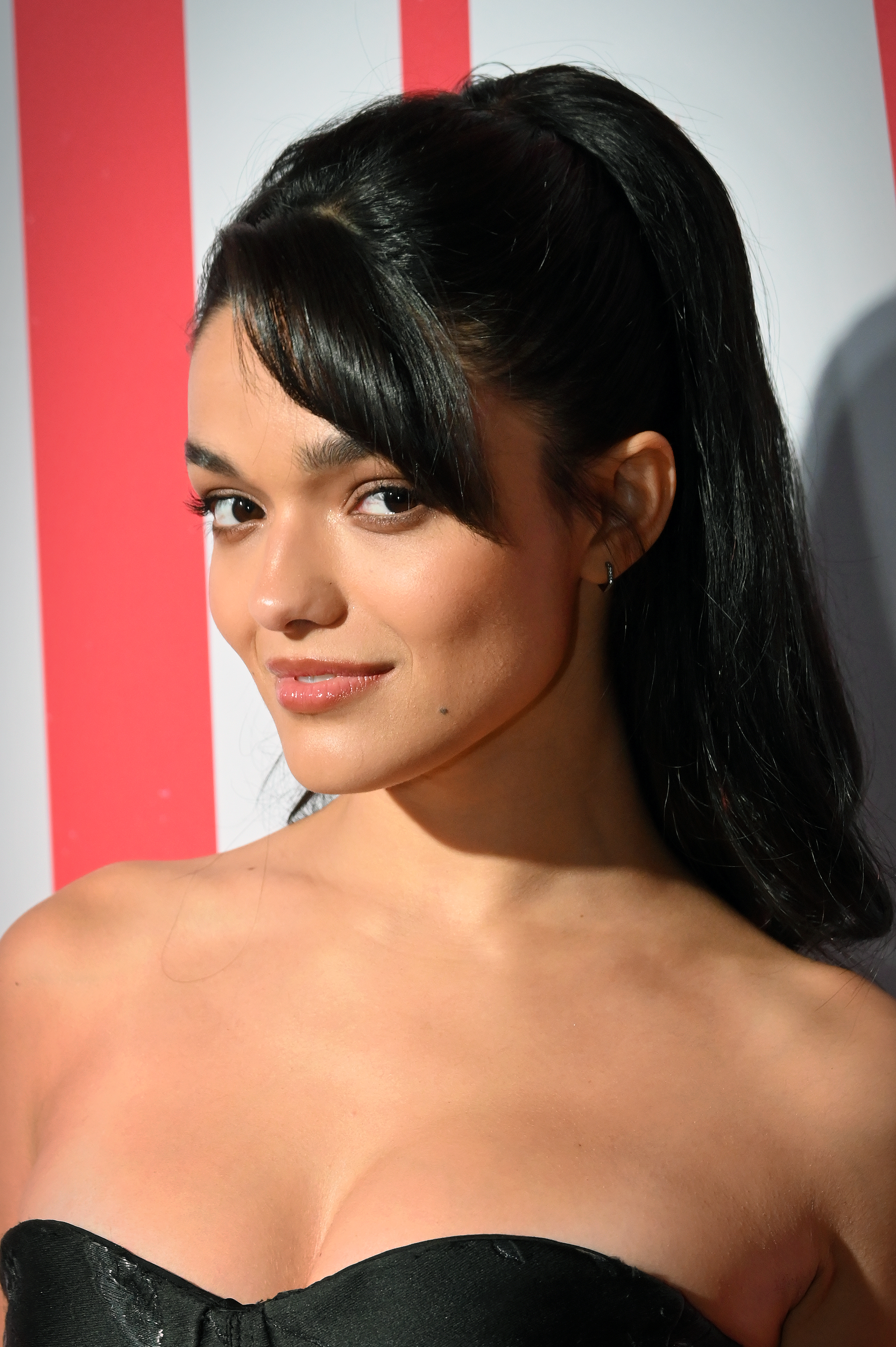
Rachel Zegler won for West Side Story (2021)

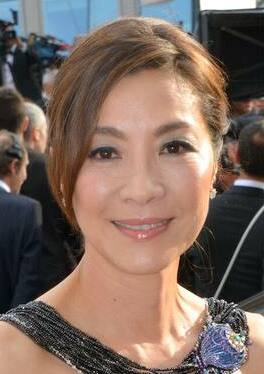
Michelle Yeoh won for Everything Everywhere All at Once (2022)

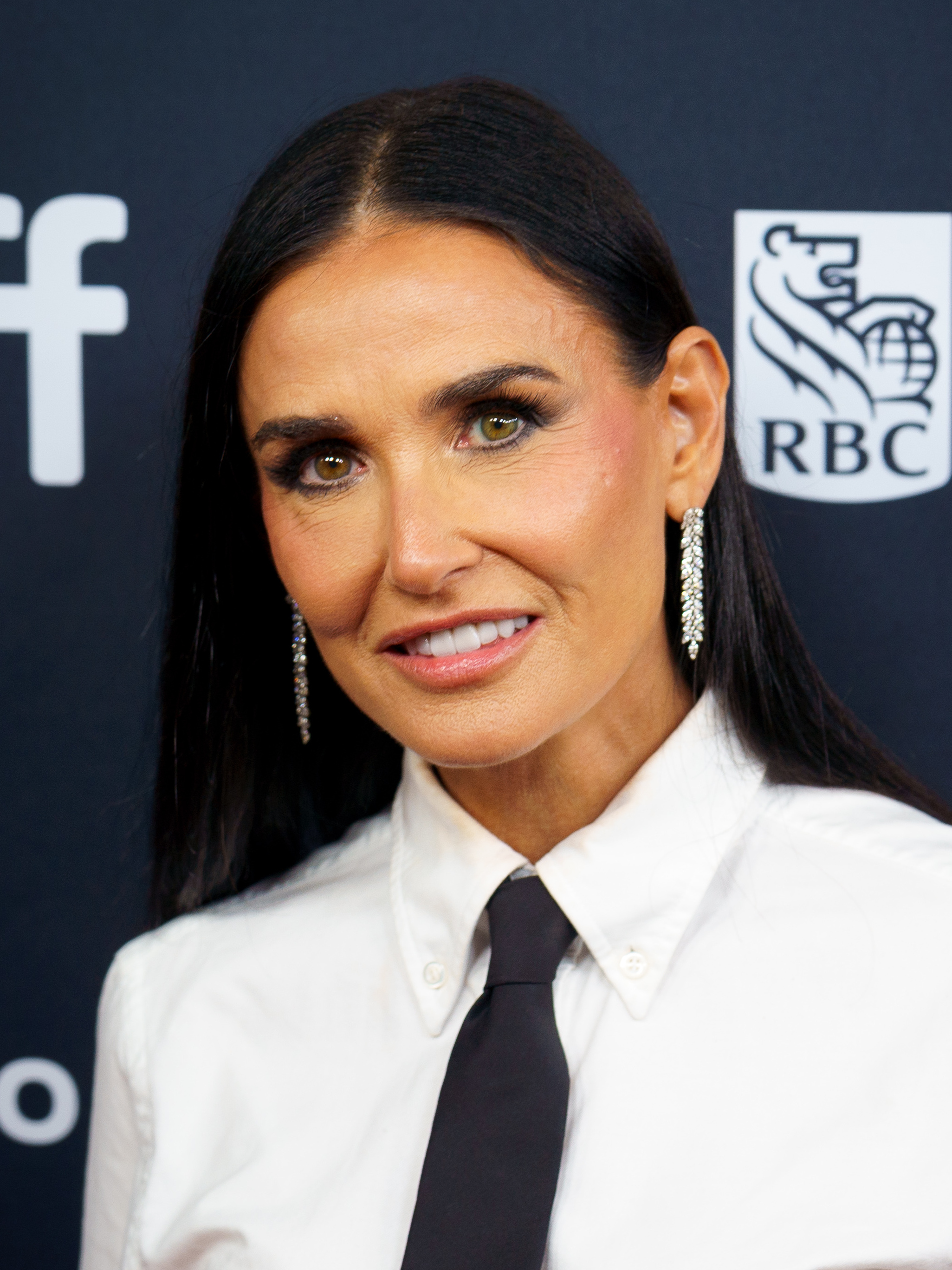
Demi Moore won for The Substance (2024)

=== 1950s ===
| Year | Actress | Role(s) | Film | Ref. |
|---|---|---|---|---|
| 1950 | Judy Holliday † | Emma "Billie" Dawn | Born Yesterday | |
| 1950 | Spring Byington | Louisa Norton | Louisa | |
| 1950 | Betty Hutton | Annie Oakley | Annie Get Your Gun | |
| 1951 | June Allyson | Cynthia Potter | Too Young to Kiss | |
| 1952 | Susan Hayward | Jane Froman | With a Song in My Heart | |
| 1952 | Katharine Hepburn | Pat Pemberton | Pat and Mike | |
| 1952 | Ginger Rogers | Edwina Fulton | Monkey Business | |
| 1953 | Ethel Merman | Sally Adams | Call Me Madam | |
| 1954 | Judy Garland | Esther Blodgett / Vicki Lester | A Star Is Born | |
| 1955 | Jean Simmons | Sarah Brown | Guys and Dolls | |
| 1956 | Deborah Kerr | Anna Leonowens | The King and I | |
| 1956 | Judy Holliday | Laura Partridge | The Solid Gold Cadillac | |
| 1956 | Machiko Kyō | Lotus Blossom | The Teahouse of the August Moon | |
| 1956 | Marilyn Monroe | Chérie | Bus Stop | |
| 1956 | Debbie Reynolds | Polly Parish | Bundle of Joy | |
| 1957 | Taina Elg | Angele Ducros | Les Girls | |
| 1957 | Kay Kendall | Sybil Wren | Les Girls | |
| 1957 | Cyd Charisse | Nina "Ninotchka" Yoschenko | Silk Stockings | |
| 1957 | Audrey Hepburn | Ariane Chavasse | Love in the Afternoon | |
| 1957 | Jean Simmons | Anne Leeds | This Could Be the Night | |
| 1958 | Rosalind Russell | Mame Dennis | Auntie Mame | |
| 1958 | Ingrid Bergman | Anna Kalman | Indiscreet | |
| 1958 | Leslie Caron | Gigi | Gigi | |
| 1958 | Doris Day | Isolde Poole | The Tunnel of Love | |
| 1958 | Mitzi Gaynor | Nellie Forbush | South Pacific | |
| 1959 | Marilyn Monroe | Sugar "Kane" Kowalczyk | Some Like It Hot | |
| 1959 | Dorothy Dandridge | Bess | Porgy and Bess | |
| 1959 | Doris Day | Jan Morrow | Pillow Talk | |
| 1959 | Shirley MacLaine | Meg Wheeler | Ask Any Girl | |
| 1959 | Lilli Palmer | Kathryn Ward | But Not for Me | |

=== 1960s ===
| Year | Actress | Role(s) | Film | Ref. |
|---|---|---|---|---|
| 1960 (18th) | Shirley MacLaine | Fran Kubelik | The Apartment | |
| 1960 (18th) | Lucille Ball | Kitty Weaver | The Facts of Life | |
| 1960 (18th) | Capucine | Princess Carolyne zu Sayn-Wittgenstein | Song Without End | |
| 1960 (18th) | Judy Holliday | Ella Peterson | Bells Are Ringing | |
| 1960 (18th) | Sophia Loren | Lucia Curcio | It Started in Naples | |
| 1961 (19th) | Rosalind Russell | Bertha Jacoby | A Majority of One | |
| 1961 (19th) | Bette Davis | Apple Annie | Pocketful of Miracles | |
| 1961 (19th) | Audrey Hepburn | Holly Golightly | Breakfast at Tiffany's | |
| 1961 (19th) | Hayley Mills | Susan Evers / Sharon McKendrick | The Parent Trap | |
| 1961 (19th) | Miyoshi Umeki | Mei Li | Flower Drum Song | |
| 1962 (20th) | Rosalind Russell | Rose Hovick | Gypsy | |
| 1962 (20th) | Doris Day | Kitty Wonder | Billy Rose's Jumbo | |
| 1962 (20th) | Jane Fonda | Isabel Haverstick | Period of Adjustment | |
| 1962 (20th) | Shirley Jones | Marian Paroo | The Music Man | |
| 1962 (20th) | Natalie Wood | Louise Hovick / Gypsy Rose Lee | Gypsy | |
| 1963 (21st) | Shirley MacLaine | Irma la Douce | Irma la Douce | |
| 1963 (21st) | Ann-Margret | Kim MacAffee | Bye Bye Birdie | |
| 1963 (21st) | Doris Day | Ellen Wagstaff Arden | Move Over, Darling | |
| 1963 (21st) | Audrey Hepburn | Regina "Reggie" Lampert | Charade | |
| 1963 (21st) | Hayley Mills | Nancy Carey | Summer Magic | |
| 1963 (21st) | Molly Picon | Sophie Baker | Come Blow Your Horn | |
| 1963 (21st) | Jill St. John | Peggy John | Come Blow Your Horn | |
| 1963 (21st) | Joanne Woodward | Sam Blake / Mimi | A New Kind of Love | |
| 1964 (22nd) | Julie Andrews † | Mary Poppins | Mary Poppins | |
| 1964 (22nd) | Audrey Hepburn | Eliza Doolittle | My Fair Lady | |
| 1964 (22nd) | Sophia Loren | Filumena Marturano | Marriage Italian Style | |
| 1964 (22nd) | Melina Mercouri | Elizabeth Lipp | Topkapi | |
| 1964 (22nd) | Debbie Reynolds | Molly Brown | The Unsinkable Molly Brown | |
| 1965 (23rd) | Julie Andrews | Maria von Trapp | The Sound of Music | |
| 1965 (23rd) | Jane Fonda | Cat Ballou | Cat Ballou | |
| 1965 (23rd) | Barbara Harris | Dr. Sandra Markowitz | A Thousand Clowns | |
| 1965 (23rd) | Rita Tushingham | Nancy Jones | The Knack ...and How to Get It | |
| 1965 (23rd) | Natalie Wood | Daisy Clover | Inside Daisy Clover | |
| 1966 (24th) | Lynn Redgrave | Georgy | Georgy Girl | |
| 1966 (24th) | Jane Fonda | Ellen Gordon | Any Wednesday | |
| 1966 (24th) | Elizabeth Hartman | Barbara Darling | You're a Big Boy Now | |
| 1966 (24th) | Shirley MacLaine | Nicole Chang | Gambit | |
| 1966 (24th) | Vanessa Redgrave | Leonie Delt | Morgan! | |
| 1967 (25th) | Anne Bancroft | Mrs. Robinson | The Graduate | |
| 1967 (25th) | Julie Andrews | Millie Dillmount | Thoroughly Modern Millie | |
| 1967 (25th) | Audrey Hepburn | Joanna "Jo" Wallace | Two for the Road | |
| 1967 (25th) | Shirley MacLaine | Paulette / Maria Teresa / Linda / Edith / Eve Minou / Marie / Jeanne | Woman Times Seven | |
| 1967 (25th) | Vanessa Redgrave | Guenevere | Camelot | |
| 1968 (26th) | Barbra Streisand † | Fanny Brice | Funny Girl | |
| 1968 (26th) | Julie Andrews | Gertrude Lawrence | Star! | |
| 1968 (26th) | Lucille Ball | Helen North | Yours, Mine and Ours | |
| 1968 (26th) | Petula Clark | Sharon McLongeran | Finian's Rainbow | |
| 1968 (26th) | Gina Lollobrigida | Carla Campbell | Buona Sera, Mrs. Campbell | |
| 1969 (27th) | Patty Duke | Natalie Miller | Me, Natalie | |
| 1969 (27th) | Ingrid Bergman | Stephanie Dickinson | Cactus Flower | |
| 1969 (27th) | Dyan Cannon | Alice Henderson | Bob & Carol & Ted & Alice | |
| 1969 (27th) | Kim Darby | Doris Bolton Owen | Generation | |
| 1969 (27th) | Mia Farrow | Mary | John and Mary | |
| 1969 (27th) | Shirley MacLaine | Charity Hope Valentine | Sweet Charity | |
| 1969 (27th) | Anna Magnani | Rose Bombolini | The Secret of Santa Vittoria | |
| 1969 (27th) | Barbra Streisand | Dolly Levi | Hello, Dolly! | |

=== 1970s ===
| Year | Actress | Role(s) | Film | Ref. |
|---|---|---|---|---|
| 1970 (28th) | Carrie Snodgress | Tina Balser | Diary of a Mad Housewife | |
| 1970 (28th) | Julie Andrews | Lili Smith | Darling Lili | |
| 1970 (28th) | Sandy Dennis | Gwen Kellerman | The Out-of-Towners | |
| 1970 (28th) | Angela Lansbury | Countess Erthe Van Orstein | Something for Everyone | |
| 1970 (28th) | Barbra Streisand | Doris | The Owl and the Pussycat | |
| 1971 (29th) | Twiggy | Polly Browne | The Boy Friend | |
| 1971 (29th) | Sandy Duncan | Amy Cooper | Star Spangled Girl | |
| 1971 (29th) | Ruth Gordon | Maude Chardin | Harold and Maude | |
| 1971 (29th) | Angela Lansbury | Eglantine Price | Bedknobs and Broomsticks | |
| 1971 (29th) | Elaine May | Henrietta Lowell | A New Leaf | |
| 1972 (30th) | Liza Minnelli † | Sally Bowles | Cabaret | |
| 1972 (30th) | Carol Burnett | Tillie Schlaine | Pete 'n' Tillie | |
| 1972 (30th) | Goldie Hawn | Jill Tanner | Butterflies Are Free | |
| 1972 (30th) | Juliet Mills | Pamela Piggott | Avanti! | |
| 1972 (30th) | Maggie Smith | Augusta Bertram | Travels with My Aunt | |
| 1973 (31st) | Glenda Jackson † | Vicky Allesio | A Touch of Class | |
| 1973 (31st) | Yvonne Elliman | Mary Magdalene | Jesus Christ Superstar | |
| 1973 (31st) | Cloris Leachman | Nettie Appleby | Charley and the Angel | |
| 1973 (31st) | Tatum O'Neal | Addie Loggins | Paper Moon | |
| 1973 (31st) | Liv Ullmann | Ann Stanley | 40 Carats | |
| 1974 (32nd) | Raquel Welch | Constance Bonacieux | The Three Musketeers | |
| 1974 (32nd) | Lucille Ball | Mame Dennis | Mame | |
| 1974 (32nd) | Diahann Carroll | Claudine Price | Claudine | |
| 1974 (32nd) | Helen Hayes | Mrs. Steinmetz | Herbie Rides Again | |
| 1974 (32nd) | Cloris Leachman | Frau Blücher | Young Frankenstein | |
| 1975 (33rd) | Ann-Margret | Nora Walker | Tommy | |
| 1975 (33rd) | Julie Christie | Jackie Shawn | Shampoo | |
| 1975 (33rd) | Goldie Hawn | Jill Haynes | Shampoo | |
| 1975 (33rd) | Liza Minnelli | Claire | Lucky Lady | |
| 1975 (33rd) | Barbra Streisand | Fanny Brice | Funny Lady | |
| 1976 (34th) | Barbra Streisand | Esther Hoffman | A Star Is Born | |
| 1976 (34th) | Barbara Harris | Blanche Tyler | Family Plot | |
| 1976 (34th) | Barbara Harris | Ellen Andrews | Freaky Friday | |
| 1976 (34th) | Jodie Foster | Annabelle Andrews | Freaky Friday | |
| 1976 (34th) | Goldie Hawn | Amanda "Duchess" Quaid | The Duchess and the Dirtwater Fox | |
| 1976 (34th) | Rita Moreno | Googie Gomez | The Ritz | |
| 1977 (35th) | Diane Keaton † | Annie Hall | Annie Hall | |
| 1977 (35th) | Marsha Mason | Paula McFadden | The Goodbye Girl | |
| 1977 (35th) | Sally Field | Carrie ("Frog") | Smokey and the Bandit | |
| 1977 (35th) | Liza Minnelli | Francine Evans | New York, New York | |
| 1977 (35th) | Lily Tomlin | Margo Sperling | The Late Show | |
| 1978 (36th) | Ellen Burstyn | Doris | Same Time, Next Year | |
| 1978 (36th) | Maggie Smith | Diana Barrie | California Suite | |
| 1978 (36th) | Jacqueline Bisset | Natasha O'Brien | Who Is Killing the Great Chefs of Europe? | |
| 1978 (36th) | Goldie Hawn | Gloria Mundy | Foul Play | |
| 1978 (36th) | Olivia Newton-John | Sandy Olsson | Grease | |
| 1979 (37th) | Bette Midler | Mary Rose Foster | The Rose | |
| 1979 (37th) | Julie Andrews | Samantha Taylor | 10 | |
| 1979 (37th) | Jill Clayburgh | Marilyn Holmberg | Starting Over | |
| 1979 (37th) | Shirley MacLaine | Eve Rand | Being There | |
| 1979 (37th) | Marsha Mason | Jennie MacLaine | Chapter Two | |

=== 1980s ===
| Year | Actress | Role(s) | Film | Ref. |
|---|---|---|---|---|
| 1980 (38th) | Sissy Spacek † | Loretta Lynn | Coal Miner's Daughter | |
| 1980 (38th) | Irene Cara | Coco Hernandez | Fame | |
| 1980 (38th) | Goldie Hawn | Judy Benjamin | Private Benjamin | |
| 1980 (38th) | Bette Midler | Herself / The Divine Miss M | Divine Madness | |
| 1980 (38th) | Dolly Parton | Doralee Rhodes | 9 to 5 | |
| 1981 (39th) | Bernadette Peters | Eileen Everson | Pennies from Heaven | |
| 1981 (39th) | Blair Brown | Dr. Nell Porter | Continental Divide | |
| 1981 (39th) | Carol Burnett | Kate Burroughs | The Four Seasons | |
| 1981 (39th) | Jill Clayburgh | Ruth Loomis | First Monday in October | |
| 1981 (39th) | Liza Minnelli | Linda Marolla | Arthur | |
| 1982 (40th) | Julie Andrews | Victoria Grant / Victor Grezhinski | Victor/Victoria | |
| 1982 (40th) | Carol Burnett | Miss Hannigan | Annie | |
| 1982 (40th) | Sally Field | Kay Villano | Kiss Me Goodbye | |
| 1982 (40th) | Goldie Hawn | Paula McCullen | Best Friends | |
| 1982 (40th) | Dolly Parton | Mona Stangley | The Best Little Whorehouse in Texas | |
| 1982 (40th) | Aileen Quinn | Annie | Annie | |
| 1983 (41st) | Julie Walters | Susan "Rita" White | Educating Rita | |
| 1983 (41st) | Anne Bancroft | Anna Bronski | To Be or Not to Be | |
| 1983 (41st) | Jennifer Beals | Alex Owens | Flashdance | |
| 1983 (41st) | Linda Ronstadt | Mabel | The Pirates of Penzance | |
| 1983 (41st) | Barbra Streisand | Yentl Mendel | Yentl | |
| 1984 (42nd) | Kathleen Turner | Joan Wilder | Romancing the Stone | |
| 1984 (42nd) | Anne Bancroft | Estelle Rolfe | Garbo Talks | |
| 1984 (42nd) | Mia Farrow | Tina Vitale | Broadway Danny Rose | |
| 1984 (42nd) | Shelley Long | Lucy Brodsky | Irreconcilable Differences | |
| 1984 (42nd) | Lily Tomlin | Edwina Cutwater | All of Me | |
| 1985 (43rd) | Kathleen Turner | Irene Walker | Prizzi's Honor | |
| 1985 (43rd) | Rosanna Arquette | Roberta Glass | Desperately Seeking Susan | |
| 1985 (43rd) | Glenn Close | Jan Chaney / Maxie Malone | Maxie | |
| 1985 (43rd) | Mia Farrow | Cecelia | The Purple Rose of Cairo | |
| 1985 (43rd) | Sally Field | Emma Moriarty | Murphy's Romance | |
| 1986 (44th) | Sissy Spacek | Rebecca Magrath / Babe Botrelle | Crimes of the Heart | |
| 1986 (44th) | Julie Andrews | Gillian Fairchild | That's Life! | |
| 1986 (44th) | Melanie Griffith | Audrey Hankel | Something Wild | |
| 1986 (44th) | Bette Midler | Barbara Whiteman | Down and Out in Beverly Hills | |
| 1986 (44th) | Kathleen Turner | Peggy Sue | Peggy Sue Got Married | |
| 1987 (45th) | Cher † | Loretta Castorini | Moonstruck | |
| 1987 (45th) | Jennifer Grey | Frances "Baby" Houseman | Dirty Dancing | |
| 1987 (45th) | Holly Hunter | Jane Craig | Broadcast News | |
| 1987 (45th) | Diane Keaton | J.C. Wiatt | Baby Boom | |
| 1987 (45th) | Bette Midler | Sandy Bronzinsky | Outrageous Fortune | |
| 1988 (46th) | Melanie Griffith | Tess McGill | Working Girl | |
| 1988 (46th) | Jamie Lee Curtis | Wanda Gershwitz | A Fish Called Wanda | |
| 1988 (46th) | Amy Irving | Isabelle Grossman | Crossing Delancey | |
| 1988 (46th) | Michelle Pfeiffer | Angela DeMarco | Married to the Mob | |
| 1988 (46th) | Susan Sarandon | Annie Savoy | Bull Durham | |
| 1989 (47th) | Jessica Tandy † | Daisy Werthan | Driving Miss Daisy | |
| 1989 (47th) | Pauline Collins | Shirley Valentine-Bradshaw | Shirley Valentine | |
| 1989 (47th) | Meg Ryan | Sally Albright | When Harry Met Sally... | |
| 1989 (47th) | Meryl Streep | Mary Fisher | She-Devil | |
| 1989 (47th) | Kathleen Turner | Barbara Rose | The War of the Roses | |

=== 1990s ===
| Year | Actress | Role(s) | Film | Ref. |
|---|---|---|---|---|
| 1990 (48th) | Julia Roberts | Vivian Ward | Pretty Woman | |
| 1990 (48th) | Mia Farrow | Alice Tate | Alice | |
| 1990 (48th) | Andie MacDowell | Bronte Mitchell | Green Card | |
| 1990 (48th) | Demi Moore | Molly Jensen | Ghost | |
| 1990 (48th) | Meryl Streep | Suzanne Vale | Postcards from the Edge | |
| 1991 (49th) | Bette Midler | Dixie Leonard | For the Boys | |
| 1991 (49th) | Ellen Barkin | Amanda Brooks | Switch | |
| 1991 (49th) | Kathy Bates | Evelyn Couch | Fried Green Tomatoes | |
| 1991 (49th) | Anjelica Huston | Morticia Addams | The Addams Family | |
| 1991 (49th) | Michelle Pfeiffer | Frankie | Frankie and Johnny | |
| 1992 (50th) | Miranda Richardson | Rose Arbuthnot | Enchanted April | |
| 1992 (50th) | Geena Davis | Dottie Hinson | A League of Their Own | |
| 1992 (50th) | Whoopi Goldberg | Deloris van Cartier | Sister Act | |
| 1992 (50th) | Shirley MacLaine | Pearl Berman | Used People | |
| 1992 (50th) | Meryl Streep | Madeline Ashton | Death Becomes Her | |
| 1993 (51st) | Angela Bassett | Tina Turner | What's Love Got to Do with It | |
| 1993 (51st) | Stockard Channing | Ouisa Kittredge | Six Degrees of Separation | |
| 1993 (51st) | Anjelica Huston | Morticia Addams | Addams Family Values | |
| 1993 (51st) | Diane Keaton | Carol Lipton | Manhattan Murder Mystery | |
| 1993 (51st) | Meg Ryan | Annie Reed | Sleepless in Seattle | |
| 1994 (52nd) | Jamie Lee Curtis | Helen Tasker | True Lies | |
| 1994 (52nd) | Geena Davis | Julia Mann | Speechless | |
| 1994 (52nd) | Andie MacDowell | Carrie | Four Weddings and a Funeral | |
| 1994 (52nd) | Shirley MacLaine | Tess Carlisle | Guarding Tess | |
| 1994 (52nd) | Emma Thompson | Dr. Diana Redding | Junior | |
| 1995 (53rd) | Nicole Kidman | Suzanne Stone-Maretto | To Die For | |
| 1995 (53rd) | Annette Bening | Sydney Ellen Wade | The American President | |
| 1995 (53rd) | Sandra Bullock | Lucy Eleanor Moderatz | While You Were Sleeping | |
| 1995 (53rd) | Toni Collette | Muriel Heslop | Muriel's Wedding | |
| 1995 (53rd) | Vanessa Redgrave | Miss Bentley | A Month by the Lake | |
| 1996 (54th) | Madonna | Eva Perón | Evita | |
| 1996 (54th) | Glenn Close | Cruella de Vil | 101 Dalmatians | |
| 1996 (54th) | Frances McDormand † | Marge Gunderson | Fargo | |
| 1996 (54th) | Debbie Reynolds | Beatrice Henderson | Mother | |
| 1996 (54th) | Barbra Streisand | Rose Morgan | The Mirror Has Two Faces | |
| 1997 (55th) | Helen Hunt † | Carol Connelly | As Good as It Gets | |
| 1997 (55th) | Joey Lauren Adams | Alyssa Jones | Chasing Amy | |
| 1997 (55th) | Pam Grier | Jackie Brown | Jackie Brown | |
| 1997 (55th) | Jennifer Lopez | Selena Quintanilla-Pérez | Selena | |
| 1997 (55th) | Julia Roberts | Julianne Potter | My Best Friend's Wedding | |
| 1998 (56th) | Gwyneth Paltrow † | Viola de Lesseps | Shakespeare in Love | |
| 1998 (56th) | Cameron Diaz | Mary Jensen | There's Something About Mary | |
| 1998 (56th) | Jane Horrocks | Laura Hoff | Little Voice | |
| 1998 (56th) | Christina Ricci | Deedee Truitt | The Opposite of Sex | |
| 1998 (56th) | Meg Ryan | Kathleen Kelly | You've Got Mail | |
| 1999 (57th) | Janet McTeer | Mary Jo Walker | Tumbleweeds | |
| 1999 (57th) | Julianne Moore | Mrs. Laura Cheveley | An Ideal Husband | |
| 1999 (57th) | Julia Roberts | Anna Scott | Notting Hill | |
| 1999 (57th) | Sharon Stone | Sarah Little | The Muse | |
| 1999 (57th) | Reese Witherspoon | Tracy Flick | Election | |

=== 2000s ===
| Year | Actress | Role(s) | Film | Ref. |
|---|---|---|---|---|
| 2000 (58th) | Renée Zellweger | Betty Sizemore | Nurse Betty | |
| 2000 (58th) | Juliette Binoche | Vianne Rocher | Chocolat | |
| 2000 (58th) | Brenda Blethyn | Grace Trevethyn | Saving Grace | |
| 2000 (58th) | Sandra Bullock | Gracie Hart | Miss Congeniality | |
| 2000 (58th) | Tracey Ullman | Frenchy Jackson | Small Time Crooks | |
| 2001 (59th) | Nicole Kidman | Satine | Moulin Rouge! | |
| 2001 (59th) | Thora Birch | Enid | Ghost World | |
| 2001 (59th) | Cate Blanchett | Kate Wheeler | Bandits | |
| 2001 (59th) | Reese Witherspoon | Elle Woods | Legally Blonde | |
| 2001 (59th) | Renée Zellweger | Bridget Jones | Bridget Jones's Diary | |
| 2002 (60th) | Renée Zellweger | Roxie Hart | Chicago | |
| 2002 (60th) | Maggie Gyllenhaal | Lee Holloway | Secretary | |
| 2002 (60th) | Goldie Hawn | Suzette Crooks | The Banger Sisters | |
| 2002 (60th) | Nia Vardalos | Fotoula "Toula" Portokalos | My Big Fat Greek Wedding | |
| 2002 (60th) | Catherine Zeta-Jones | Velma Kelly | Chicago | |
| 2003 (61st) | Diane Keaton | Erica Barry | Something's Gotta Give | |
| 2003 (61st) | Jamie Lee Curtis | Dr. Tess Coleman | Freaky Friday | |
| 2003 (61st) | Scarlett Johansson | Charlotte Riley | Lost in Translation | |
| 2003 (61st) | Diane Lane | Frances Mayes | Under the Tuscan Sun | |
| 2003 (61st) | Helen Mirren | Chris Harper | Calendar Girls | |
| 2004 (62nd) | Annette Bening | Julia Lambert | Being Julia | |
| 2004 (62nd) | Ashley Judd | Linda Porter | De-Lovely | |
| 2004 (62nd) | Emmy Rossum | Christine Daaé | The Phantom of the Opera | |
| 2004 (62nd) | Kate Winslet | Clementine Kruczynski | Eternal Sunshine of the Spotless Mind | |
| 2004 (62nd) | Renée Zellweger | Bridget Jones | Bridget Jones: The Edge of Reason | |
| 2005 (63rd) | Reese Witherspoon † | June Carter Cash | Walk the Line | |
| 2005 (63rd) | Judi Dench | Laura Henderson | Mrs Henderson Presents | |
| 2005 (63rd) | Keira Knightley | Elizabeth Bennet | Pride & Prejudice | |
| 2005 (63rd) | Laura Linney | Joan Berkman | The Squid and the Whale | |
| 2005 (63rd) | Sarah Jessica Parker | Meredith Morton | The Family Stone | |
| 2006 (64th) | Meryl Streep | Miranda Priestly | The Devil Wears Prada | |
| 2006 (64th) | Annette Bening | Deirdre Burroughs | Running with Scissors | |
| 2006 (64th) | Toni Collette | Sheryl Hoover | Little Miss Sunshine | |
| 2006 (64th) | Beyoncé Knowles | Deena Jones | Dreamgirls | |
| 2006 (64th) | Renée Zellweger | Beatrix Potter | Miss Potter | |
| 2007 (65th) | Marion Cotillard † | Édith Piaf | La Vie en Rose | |
| 2007 (65th) | Amy Adams | Giselle | Enchanted | |
| 2007 (65th) | Nikki Blonsky | Tracy Turnblad | Hairspray | |
| 2007 (65th) | Helena Bonham Carter | Mrs. Lovett | Sweeney Todd: The Demon Barber of Fleet Street | |
| 2007 (65th) | Elliot Page | Juno MacGuff | Juno | |
| 2008 (66th) | Sally Hawkins | Pauline "Poppy" Cross | Happy-Go-Lucky | |
| 2008 (66th) | Rebecca Hall | Vicky Marielle | Vicky Cristina Barcelona | |
| 2008 (66th) | Frances McDormand | Linda Litzke | Burn After Reading | |
| 2008 (66th) | Meryl Streep | Donna Sheridan | Mamma Mia! | |
| 2008 (66th) | Emma Thompson | Kate Walker | Last Chance Harvey | |
| 2009 (67th) | Meryl Streep | Julia Child | Julie & Julia | |
| 2009 (67th) | Sandra Bullock | Margaret Tate | The Proposal | |
| 2009 (67th) | Marion Cotillard | Luisa Acari Contini | Nine | |
| 2009 (67th) | Julia Roberts | Claire Stenwick | Duplicity | |
| 2009 (67th) | Meryl Streep | Jane Adler | It's Complicated | |

=== 2010s ===
| Year | Actress | Role(s) | Film | Ref. |
|---|---|---|---|---|
| 2010 (68th) | Annette Bening | Dr. Nicole "Nic" Allgood | The Kids Are All Right | |
| 2010 (68th) | Anne Hathaway | Maggie Murdock | Love & Other Drugs | |
| 2010 (68th) | Angelina Jolie | Elise Clifton-Ward | The Tourist | |
| 2010 (68th) | Julianne Moore | Jules Allgood | The Kids Are All Right | |
| 2010 (68th) | Emma Stone | Olive Penderghast | Easy A | |
| 2011 (69th) | Michelle Williams | Marilyn Monroe | My Week with Marilyn | |
| 2011 (69th) | Jodie Foster | Penelope Longstreet | Carnage | |
| 2011 (69th) | Charlize Theron | Mavis Gary | Young Adult | |
| 2011 (69th) | Kristen Wiig | Annie Walker | Bridesmaids | |
| 2011 (69th) | Kate Winslet | Nancy Cowan | Carnage | |
| 2012 (70th) | Jennifer Lawrence † | Tiffany Maxwell | Silver Linings Playbook | |
| 2012 (70th) | Emily Blunt | Harriet Chetwode-Talbot | Salmon Fishing in the Yemen | |
| 2012 (70th) | Judi Dench | Evelyn Greenslade | The Best Exotic Marigold Hotel | |
| 2012 (70th) | Maggie Smith | Jean Horton | Quartet | |
| 2012 (70th) | Meryl Streep | Kay Soames | Hope Springs | |
| 2013 (71st) | Amy Adams | Sydney Prosser / Lady Edith Greensly | American Hustle | |
| 2013 (71st) | Julie Delpy | Céline Wallace | Before Midnight | |
| 2013 (71st) | Greta Gerwig | Frances Halladay | Frances Ha | |
| 2013 (71st) | Julia Louis-Dreyfus | Eva Henderson | Enough Said | |
| 2013 (71st) | Meryl Streep | Violet Weston | August: Osage County | |
| 2014 (72nd) | Amy Adams | Margaret Keane | Big Eyes | |
| 2014 (72nd) | Emily Blunt | The Baker's Wife | Into the Woods | |
| 2014 (72nd) | Helen Mirren | Madame Mallory | The Hundred-Foot Journey | |
| 2014 (72nd) | Julianne Moore | Havana Segrand | Maps to the Stars | |
| 2014 (72nd) | Quvenzhané Wallis | Annie Bennett | Annie | |
| 2015 (73rd) | Jennifer Lawrence | Joy Mangano | Joy | |
| 2015 (73rd) | Melissa McCarthy | Susan Cooper | Spy | |
| 2015 (73rd) | Amy Schumer | Amy Townsend | Trainwreck | |
| 2015 (73rd) | Maggie Smith | Mary Shepherd / Margaret Fairchild | The Lady in the Van | |
| 2015 (73rd) | Lily Tomlin | Elle Reid | Grandma | |
| 2016 (74th) | Emma Stone † | Mia Dolan | La La Land | |
| 2016 (74th) | Annette Bening | Dorothea Fields | 20th Century Women | |
| 2016 (74th) | Lily Collins | Marla Mabrey | Rules Don't Apply | |
| 2016 (74th) | Hailee Steinfeld | Nadine Franklin | The Edge of Seventeen | |
| 2016 (74th) | Meryl Streep | Florence Foster Jenkins | Florence Foster Jenkins | |
| 2017 (75th) | Saoirse Ronan | Christine "Lady Bird" McPherson | Lady Bird | |
| 2017 (75th) | Judi Dench | Queen Victoria | Victoria & Abdul | |
| 2017 (75th) | Helen Mirren | Ella Spencer | The Leisure Seeker | |
| 2017 (75th) | Margot Robbie | Tonya Harding | I, Tonya | |
| 2017 (75th) | Emma Stone | Billie Jean King | Battle of the Sexes | |
| 2018 (76th) | Olivia Colman † | Queen Anne | The Favourite | |
| 2018 (76th) | Emily Blunt | Mary Poppins | Mary Poppins Returns | |
| 2018 (76th) | Elsie Fisher | Kayla Day | Eighth Grade | |
| 2018 (76th) | Charlize Theron | Marlo Moreau | Tully | |
| 2018 (76th) | Constance Wu | Rachel Chu | Crazy Rich Asians | |
| 2019 (77th) | Awkwafina | Billi Wang | The Farewell | |
| 2019 (77th) | Ana de Armas | Marta Cabrera | Knives Out | |
| 2019 (77th) | Cate Blanchett | Bernadette Fox | Where'd You Go, Bernadette | |
| 2019 (77th) | Beanie Feldstein | Molly Davidson | Booksmart | |
| 2019 (77th) | Emma Thompson | Katherine Newbury | Late Night | |

=== 2020s ===
| Year | Actress | Role(s) | Film | Ref. |
|---|---|---|---|---|
| 2020 (78th) | Rosamund Pike | Marla Grayson | I Care a Lot | |
| 2020 (78th) | Maria Bakalova | Tutar Sagdiyev | Borat Subsequent Moviefilm | |
| 2020 (78th) | Kate Hudson | Kazu Gamble | Music | |
| 2020 (78th) | Michelle Pfeiffer | Frances Price | French Exit | |
| 2020 (78th) | Anya Taylor-Joy | Emma Woodhouse | Emma | |
| 2021 (79th) | Rachel Zegler | María | West Side Story | |
| 2021 (79th) | Marion Cotillard | Ann Defrasnoux | Annette | |
| 2021 (79th) | Alana Haim | Alana Kane | Licorice Pizza | |
| 2021 (79th) | Jennifer Lawrence | Kate Dibiasky | Don't Look Up | |
| 2021 (79th) | Emma Stone | Estella / Cruella | Cruella | |
| 2022 (80th) | Michelle Yeoh † | Evelyn Quan Wang | Everything Everywhere All at Once | |
| 2022 (80th) | Lesley Manville | Ada Harris | Mrs. Harris Goes to Paris | |
| 2022 (80th) | Margot Robbie | Nellie LaRoy | Babylon | |
| 2022 (80th) | Anya Taylor-Joy | Margot Mills / Erin | The Menu | |
| 2022 (80th) | Emma Thompson | Nancy Stokes / Susan Robinson | Good Luck to You, Leo Grande | |
| 2023 (81st) | Emma Stone † | Bella Baxter | Poor Things | |
| 2023 (81st) | Fantasia Barrino | Miss Celie Harris Johnson | The Color Purple | |
| 2023 (81st) | Jennifer Lawrence | Maddie Barker | No Hard Feelings | |
| 2023 (81st) | Natalie Portman | Elizabeth Berry | May December | |
| 2023 (81st) | Alma Pöysti | Ansa | Fallen Leaves | |
| 2023 (81st) | Margot Robbie | Barbie | Barbie | |
| 2024 (82nd) | Demi Moore | Elisabeth Sparkle | The Substance | |
| 2024 (82nd) | Amy Adams | Mother | Nightbitch | |
| 2024 (82nd) | Cynthia Erivo | Elphaba Thropp | Wicked | |
| 2024 (82nd) | Karla Sofía Gascón | Emilia Pérez / Juan "Manitas" Del Monte | Emilia Pérez | |
| 2024 (82nd) | Mikey Madison † | Anora "Ani" Mikheeva | Anora | |
| 2024 (82nd) | Zendaya | Tashi Duncan | Challengers | |
| 2025 (83rd) | Rose Byrne | Linda | If I Had Legs I'd Kick You | |
| 2025 (83rd) | Cynthia Erivo | Elphaba Thropp | Wicked: For Good | |
| 2025 (83rd) | Kate Hudson | Claire Sardina | Song Sung Blue | |
| 2025 (83rd) | Chase Infiniti | Willa Ferguson | One Battle After Another | |
| 2025 (83rd) | Amanda Seyfried | Ann Lee | The Testament of Ann Lee | |
| 2025 (83rd) | Emma Stone | Michelle Fuller | Bugonia | |

== Multiple nominees ==
10 nominations

- Meryl Streep

9 nominations

- Shirley MacLaine

8 nominations

- Julie Andrews

7 nominations

- Goldie Hawn
- Barbra Streisand

6 nominations

- Emma Stone

5 nominations

- Annette Bening
- Audrey Hepburn
- Bette Midler
- Renée Zellweger

4 nominations

- Amy Adams
- Doris Day
- Mia Farrow
- Diane Keaton
- Jennifer Lawrence
- Liza Minnelli
- Julia Roberts
- Maggie Smith
- Emma Thompson
- Kathleen Turner

3 nominations

- Lucille Ball
- Anne Bancroft
- Emily Blunt
- Sandra Bullock
- Carol Burnett
- Marion Cotillard
- Jamie Lee Curtis
- Judi Dench
- Sally Field
- Jane Fonda
- Barbara Harris
- Helen Mirren
- Julianne Moore
- Michelle Pfeiffer
- Vanessa Redgrave
- Debbie Reynolds
- Margot Robbie
- Rosalind Russell
- Meg Ryan
- Lily Tomlin
- Reese Witherspoon

2 nominations

- Ann-Margret
- Ingrid Bergman
- Cate Blanchett
- Jill Clayburgh
- Glenn Close
- Toni Collette
- Geena Davis
- Cynthia Erivo
- Jodie Foster
- Melanie Griffith
- Judy Holliday
- Kate Hudson
- Anjelica Huston
- Nicole Kidman
- Angela Lansbury
- Cloris Leachman
- Sophia Loren
- Andie MacDowell
- Marsha Mason
- Frances McDormand
- Hayley Mills
- Marilyn Monroe
- Demi Moore
- Dolly Parton
- Jean Simmons
- Sissy Spacek
- Anya Taylor-Joy
- Charlize Theron
- Kate Winslet
- Natalie Wood

== Multiple wins ==
3 awards

- Julie Andrews (2 consecutive)
- Rosalind Russell (2 consecutive)

2 awards

- Amy Adams (consecutive)
- Annette Bening
- Diane Keaton
- Nicole Kidman
- Jennifer Lawrence
- Shirley MacLaine
- Bette Midler
- Sissy Spacek
- Emma Stone
- Meryl Streep
- Barbra Streisand
- Kathleen Turner (consecutive)
- Renée Zellweger

== Firsts ==
- Angela Bassett became the first actress of African descent to win when she won in 1993.
- Marion Cotillard became the first actress to win for a non-English language performance when she won in 2007.
- Awkwafina became the first actress of Asian descent to win when she won in 2020.
- Jessica Tandy became the oldest winner in that category at 80 years old when she won in 1989.
- Rachel Zegler became the first actress of Latino/Hispanic descent and the youngest winner in that category at 20 years old when she won in 2022.
- Michelle Yeoh became the first Malaysian actress to win when she won in 2023.
- Emma Stone became the first actress to win the Academy Award for Best Actress twice for her two winning performances in this category in 2017 (La La Land) and 2024 (Poor Things)
- Cynthia Erivo became the first black actress to be nominated twice in this category for her performances in Wicked and Wicked: For Good

== See also ==
- Academy Award for Best Actress
- Critics' Choice Movie Award for Best Actress
- Independent Spirit Award for Best Female Lead
- BAFTA Award for Best Actress in a Leading Role
- Golden Globe Award for Best Actress in a Motion Picture – Drama
- Screen Actors Guild Award for Outstanding Performance by a Female Actor in a Leading Role
