= Up the Down Staircase =

1964 novel by Bel Kaufman

- First edition
- Author: Bel Kaufman
- Language: English
- Publisher: Prentice-Hall
- Publication date: January 27, 1965
- Publication place: United States
- Media type: Print (Hardback & Paperback)
- Pages: 340 p. (hardback edition) & 368 p. (paperback edition)
- ISBN: 0-06-097361-7 (paperback edition)
- OCLC: 23255071
- Dewey Decimal: 813/.54 20
- LC Class: PS3561.A83 U6 1991

Up the Down Staircase is a novel written by Bel Kaufman, published on January 27, 1965, which spent 64 weeks on The New York Times Best Seller list. In 1967 it was released as a film starring Sandy Dennis.

== Plot ==
Sylvia Barrett, an idealistic English teacher at an inner city high school, hopes to nurture her students' interest in classic literature (especially Chaucer) and writing. During her first year of teaching, she quickly becomes discouraged and frustrated by the school's bureaucracy, the indifference of her students, and the incompetence of many of her colleagues. The title of the book is taken from a memo telling her why a student was being punished: he had gone "up the down staircase". She decides to leave the public (government-funded) school system to work in a smaller private school setting. She changes her mind, though, when she realizes that she has, indeed, touched the lives of her students.

The novel is epistolary; aside from opening and closing chapters consisting entirely of dialogue the story is told through memos from the office, fragments of notes dropped in the trash can, essays handed in to be graded, lesson plans, suggestions dropped in the class suggestion box, and inter-classroom notes that are a dialogue between Sylvia and an older teacher. Sylvia also writes letters to a friend from college who chose to get married and start a family rather than pursuing a career. These letters serve as a recap and summary of key events in the book, and offer a portrait of women's roles and responsibilities in American society in the mid-1960s.

== Adaptations and influences ==
The novel has been adapted to film and the stage. Tad Mosel wrote the screenplay for the 1967 film version starring Sandy Dennis as Sylvia Barrett, as well as Patrick Bedford, Ruth White, Jean Stapleton and Eileen Heckart. The play version is frequently performed in high school drama classes. The film version was parodied in Mad magazine as "In the Out Exit" in regular issue #118, April 1968. Up the Down Staircase's title was parodied by the South Park episode "Up the Down Steroid". The title of Porcupine Tree's 1993 album Up The Downstair is an homage to the novel.
