= Any Wednesday =

Any Wednesday may refer to:

- Any Wednesday (play), a 1964 play by Muriel Resnik
- Any Wednesday (film), a 1966 film based on the play
