= Robert Mulligan =

American director, producer (1925–2008)

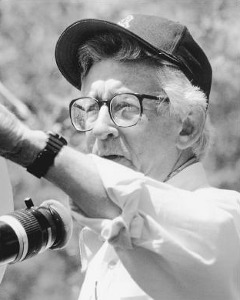
- Mulligan, c. 1991
- Born: Robert Patrick Mulligan; August 23, 1925; New York City, U.S.
- Died: December 20, 2008 (aged 83); Lyme, Connecticut, U.S.
- Education: Fordham University
- Occupations: Director; producer
- Years active: 1948–1992
- Spouses: Jane Lee Sutherland (m. 1951; div. 1968) Sandy Mulligan (m. 1971)
- Children: 3
- Relatives: Richard Mulligan (brother)

Robert Patrick Mulligan (August 23, 1925 – December 20, 2008) was an American director and producer. His dramas include To Kill a Mockingbird (1962), Summer of '42 (1971), The Other (1972), Same Time, Next Year (1978), and The Man in the Moon (1991). He collaborated with producer Alan J. Pakula in the 1960s.

== Early life ==
Mulligan served in either the U.S. Navy or the U.S. Marine Corps during World War II as a radio operator. At war's end, he graduated from Fordham University, then obtained work in the editorial department of The New York Times, but left to pursue a career in television.

== Career ==
=== Television ===
Mulligan began his television career as a messenger boy for CBS television. He worked diligently, and by 1948 was directing major dramatic television shows.

In the early 1950s he directed many episodes of Suspense. He followed this directing for The Philco Television Playhouse, Armstrong Circle Theatre, The Alcoa Hour, The United States Steel Hour, Studio One in Hollywood, Goodyear Playhouse and The Seven Lively Arts.

=== 1950s–1960s ===
In 1957 Mulligan directed his first motion picture, Fear Strikes Out, starring Anthony Perkins as tormented baseball player Jimmy Piersall. The film was the first feature he would direct alongside longtime collaborator Alan J. Pakula, who received his first producer credit with the film. Pakula once confessed that "working with Bob set me back in directing several years because I enjoyed working with him, and we were having a good time, and I enjoyed the work."

Mulligan returned to television to direct episodes of Playhouse 90, Rendezvous, The Dupont Show of the Month, and TV versions of Ah, Wilderness! and The Moon and Sixpence. In 1959 he won an Emmy Award for directing The Moon and Sixpence, a television production that was the American small-screen debut of Laurence Olivier.

Mulligan returned to feature films to make two Tony Curtis vehicles, The Rat Race and The Great Imposter. He was going to make a third, The Wine of Youth but it was not made.

Mulligan then made two Rock Hudson vehicles, Come September and The Spiral Road.

=== Pakula collaboration ===
In the early 1960s, Pakula returned to Mulligan with the proposition of directing To Kill a Mockingbird (1962), based on the Pulitzer Prize-winning novel by Harper Lee. Mulligan accepted the offer despite the awareness that "the other studios didn't want it because what's it about? It's about a middle-aged lawyer with two kids. There's no romance, no violence (except off-screen). There's no action. What is there? Where's the story?" With the help of a screenplay by Horton Foote as well as the pivotal casting of Gregory Peck in the role of Atticus Finch, the film became a huge hit, and Mulligan was nominated for an Academy Award for Best Director.

Mulligan and Pakula followed To Kill a Mockingbird with five more films. Love With the Proper Stranger (1963), starred Natalie Wood and Steve McQueen. Baby the Rain Must Fall (1965) starred McQueen. Inside Daisy Clover (1965) starred Wood. Up the Down Staircase (1967) was based on a humorous novel by Bel Kaufman and starred Sandy Dennis as the schoolteacher Sylvia Barrett. The Stalking Moon (1968), based on a Western novel by T.V. Olsen and reuniting Mulligan and Pakula with Peck, this time in the role of Sam Varner, a scout who attempts to escort a white woman (Eva Marie Saint) and her half-Indian son to New Mexico after they are pursued by a bloodthirsty Apache, the boy's father. After this film, Pakula parted company from Mulligan to pursue his own career in directing.

=== 1970s ===
Mulligan began the 1970s with The Pursuit of Happiness (1971), based on the 1968 novel by Thomas Rogers, which had been a finalist for the National Book Award. The film starred Michael Sarrazin as William Popper, a college student (disillusioned with both right-wing and left-wing American politics) whose life is complicated when he accidentally runs over and kills an elderly woman and is quickly sentenced to one year in prison for vehicular manslaughter. He then contemplates breaking out of prison and fleeing the country with his girlfriend (played by Barbara Hershey), since neither feels their lives have made any significant difference in America.

Also in 1971, Mulligan released Summer of '42 (1971), which was based on the coming-of-age novel by Herman Raucher and starred Gary Grimes as a teenage stand-in for Raucher who spends a summer vacation in 1942 on Nantucket Island lusting after a young woman (Jennifer O'Neill) whose husband has shipped off to fight in the war. A box office smash, Summer of '42 went on to gross over $20 million, and Mulligan was nominated for a Golden Globe Award for Best Director.

Summer of '42 was followed by The Other (1972), a thriller film scripted by former Hollywood actor Thomas Tryon from his own book. It told the story of two 9-year-old boys, Niles and Holland Perry (played by real-life twins Chris and Marty Udvarnoky), who get involved in a series of grisly murders at their home on Peaquot Landing in the 1930s. Although the film was not an immediate success at the box office, it has since gone on to gain a steady cult following. In 1973, Mulligan was slated to direct the adaptations of both The Drowning Pool and That Championship Season, before the jobs went to other directors.

In the mid-1970s, Mulligan was briefly engaged in talks with producers Julia and Michael Phillips to direct Taxi Driver (1976), with Jeff Bridges to star as the psychotic Travis Bickle. Objections posed by screenwriter Paul Schrader caused the project to be turned over to Martin Scorsese and Robert De Niro instead.

Mulligan proceeded by rounding out the 1970s with three films dominated by performances from A-list Hollywood actors: Jason Miller as a Los Angeles locksmith threatened by hitmen in The Nickel Ride (1974); Richard Gere as an Italian-American youth trying to break from his working-class family in Bloodbrothers (1978); and Alan Alda and Ellen Burstyn portraying George and Doris, a pair of long-term adulterers, in Same Time Next Year (1978), based on the play by Bernard Slade.

=== 1980s ===
As the 1980s dawned, Mulligan found work harder to come by, succeeding in directing only two films by the end of the decade.

Mulligan had started directing Rich and Famous for MGM but asked to be replaced after a week of shooting; George Cukor replaced him.

Mulligan was also fired from directing The Pursuit of D.B. Cooper because he allegedly took seven days to shoot a whitewater rapids chase.

At another point, according to screenwriter Hampton Fancher, Mulligan was attached to direct Blade Runner; his adaptation would have starred Robert Mitchum. Fancher states that the deal with Mulligan fell apart because of "ego" and because the studio at the time, Universal, wanted a happier ending. Mulligan was also briefly attached to direct Cutter's Way; his version would have starred Dustin Hoffman.

Kiss Me Goodbye (1982), starring Sally Field, James Caan and Jeff Bridges, was an attempt at a comedic remake of the Brazilian film Dona Flor and Her Two Husbands, and was critically derided, although it was a modest commercial success.

Clara's Heart (1988), starring Whoopi Goldberg and a young Neil Patrick Harris, was released five years later to negative box office numbers and reviews, and was panned on television by Siskel and Ebert. It has, however, received recent praise from film professor Robert Keser.

=== 1990s ===
In the 1990s, at the age of 66, Mulligan would release his final film, The Man in the Moon (1991), starring a 14-year-old Reese Witherspoon, in her film debut. The film was praised by Roger Ebert, who included it at #8 in his Top 10 list of the best films of 1991, declaring, "Nothing else [Mulligan] has done... approaches the purity and perfection of The Man in the Moon... (with a) poetic, bittersweet tone, and avoid(ing) the sentimentalism and cheap emotion that could have destroyed this story."

Later in March 1992, Mulligan made headlines when he angrily took his name off of airline cuts of The Man in the Moon, after he had learned that the film would be heavily censored by American and Delta flights. In an interview with Ebert, Mulligan explained, "The airlines demanded so many excessive and unreasonable cuts and changes that I took my name off the film... it's the first time I've ever done that."

Before his death in 2008, Mulligan had commissioned playwright Beth Henley to write a screenplay from the novel A Long and Happy Life by Reynolds Price, which Mulligan had bought the rights to with his own money. The film was never made.

== Personal life ==
Mulligan's first wife was Jane Lee Sutherland (1931-2010). Their marriage lasted from 1951 to 1968 and produced three children. His second marriage, to Sandy Mulligan, lasted from 1971 until his death. He was the elder brother of actor Richard Mulligan, whom he cast in Love with the Proper Stranger.

Mulligan was known to sometimes clash with studio executives. A rumor circulated that during the 1960's, Mulligan got into a heated confrontation with Warner Bros. president Jack Warner and allegedly threw a chair at Warner. Decades later, Mulligan confirmed this story during a conversation with producer Bill Borden.

Mulligan's career was hurt by his battle with alcoholism. His daughter, Beth Mulligan, later stated that their life at home was "chaotic and frightening."

== Death ==
Mulligan died of heart disease at his home in Lyme, Connecticut, on December 20, 2008, at the age of 83.

He was survived by his second wife, Sandy; three children; and two grandchildren.

One of Mulligan's surviving grandchildren is Los Angeles music producer Quentin Mulligan, also known as frumhere. One of his music albums is entitled Same Time, Next Year. Reminiscing about his grandfather, Quentin has stated, "Grandpa was a living life."

== Style ==
Mulligan described his role as a director thusly: “Things have to sift through me. That's me up there on the screen. The shooting, the editing, the use of music—all that represents my attitude toward the material.” In a 1978 interview with the Village Voice, he insisted, "I don't know anything about 'the Mulligan style.' If you can find it, well, that's your job."

Chicago critic Jonathan Rosenbaum once hailed Mulligan as:

one of the only American directors left with a fully achieved style that is commonly (if misleadingly) termed classical... he is a master of carving out dramatic space with liquid camera movements and precise angles, a mastery that's matched by a special sensitivity in handling adolescents."

Critic and filmmaker François Truffaut also championed the director's work. Truffaut was, in particular, a fan of Fear Strikes Out and was impressed that it was only Mulligan's first feature, writing, "It is rare to see a first film so free of faults and bombast." Summing up Mulligan's talents as a whole, Truffaut concluded:

If there were French directors as lucid as Mulligan, as capable of telling something more than anecdotes, the image of our country on the screen would be a bit less oversimplified.

Another filmmaker who admired Mulligan's work was Stanley Kubrick, who featured a clip from Summer of '42 in The Shining (1980).

Of his fellow filmmakers, Mulligan admired Ingmar Bergman for his "wonderful use of that simple, honest technique" of allowing the camera to "rest on a human face quietly, unobtrusively, and let something happen." He championed the films of Satyajit Ray and joined in a protest with Bergman and David Lean when Ray's film, Charulata, was rejected at the 1961 Cannes Film Festival.

Mulligan also had his critics. Actor James Caan described him as the most incompetent filmmaker he had ever worked with saying "A lot of mediocrity was produced" following their work on Kiss Me Goodbye in 1982. Caan cited his experiences as a key reason why he made no movies for 5 years from 1982 to 1987.

Mulligan was a fan of Charles Dickens, whose work he had read in his youth:

I read all of it, I don't know how many times. I'm convinced that if Charles Dickens were alive and well and living in Los Angeles, he'd be the best producer-director-writer of movies ever. I think if anybody really wants to learn how to tell a story in images, they should read Dickens. At least once or twice a year.

== Filmography ==
Year	Title	Director	Producer	Notes
1957	Fear Strikes Out	Yes	No	
1960	The Rat Race	Yes	No	
1961	The Great Impostor	Yes	No	
1961	Come September	Yes	No	
1962	The Spiral Road	Yes	No	
1962	To Kill a Mockingbird	Yes	Uncredited	
1963	Love with the Proper Stranger	Yes	No	
1965	Baby the Rain Must Fall	Yes	No	
1965	Inside Daisy Clover	Yes	No	
1967	Up the Down Staircase	Yes	No	
1968	The Stalking Moon	Yes	No	
1971	The Pursuit of Happiness	Yes	No	
1971	Summer of '42	Yes	No	Also narrator (uncredited)
1972	The Other	Yes	Yes	
1974	The Nickel Ride	Yes	Yes	
1978	Bloodbrothers	Yes	No	
1978	Same Time, Next Year	Yes	No	
1982	Kiss Me Goodbye	Yes	Yes	
1988	Clara's Heart	Yes	No	
1991	The Man in the Moon	Yes	No	

== Accolades for Mulligan's features ==
Year	Feature	Oscars		BAFTAs		Golden Globes	
Year	Feature	Nominations	Wins	Nominations	Wins	Nominations	Wins
1961	Come September					1	1
1962	To Kill a Mockingbird	8	3	2		5	3
1963	Love with the Proper Stranger	5				2	
1965	Inside Daisy Clover	3				3	2
1971	Summer of '42	4	1	2	1	4	
1978	Bloodbrothers	1					
1978	Same Time, Next Year	4				3	1
1982	Kiss Me Goodbye					1	
1988	Clara's Heart					1	
Total		25	4	4	1	20	7

Directed Academy Award Performances
Under Mulligan's direction, these actors have received Academy Award nominations and wins for their performances in their respective roles.

Year	Performer	Feature	Result
Best Actor
1962	Gregory Peck	To Kill a Mockingbird	Won
Best Actress
1963	Natalie Wood	Love with the Proper Stranger	Nominated
1978	Ellen Burstyn	Same Time, Next Year	Nominated
Best Supporting Actress
1962	Mary Badham	To Kill a Mockingbird	Nominated
1965	Ruth Gordon	Inside Daisy Clover	Nominated
