= Tad Mosel =

American playwright

- Born: George Ault Mosel Jr. May 1, 1922; Steubenville, Ohio, U.S.
- Died: August 24, 2008 (aged 86); Concord, New Hampshire, U.S.
- Education: Amherst College (BA); Yale University (MFA); Columbia University (MA)
- Occupation: Playwright
- Partner: Raymond Tatro (1950s–1995†)

Tad Mosel (May 1, 1922 – August 24, 2008) was an American playwright and one of the leading dramatists of hour-long teleplay genre for live television during the 1950s. He received the 1961 Pulitzer Prize for Drama for his play All the Way Home.

== Biography ==
=== Early years ===
Mosel was born George Ault Mosel Jr. in Steubenville, Ohio, to George Ault Mosel Sr. and Margaret Norman. Raised as a Presbyterian, he was eight years old when his father's wholesale grocery business failed following the stock market crash, and the family moved to the suburbs of New York City. In 1931, George Sr. launched a successful New York advertising company. Remembering his youth in Larchmont, New York, and New Rochelle, New York, Mosel stated:

My brother and I were given a sense of security. My brother is four years older than I am. We had a good, wonderful home. I had a marvelous mother and father... I adored my mother and father. They were both wonderful parents.

Mosel's interest in theater began in 1936 when he saw Katharine Cornell on Broadway in George Bernard Shaw's Saint Joan. He went for one year to the Mount Hermon School in Northfield, Massachusetts, graduating from New Rochelle High School. After the attack on Pearl Harbor, Mosel dropped out of Amherst College to enlist in the Army Air Force. During World War II, he was a Sergeant in the U.S. Air Force Weather Service (1943–46) as a weather observer, including one year in the South Pacific. In the post-WWII years he finished at Amherst and did graduate studies at the Yale Drama School (BA), followed by a Master's at Columbia University. He was writing plays while auditioning as an actor, and in 1949 he was on Broadway in the scene-stealing, non-speaking role of a confused private in the farce At War with the Army.

=== Career ===
His first teleplay was performed on Chevrolet Tele-Theater in 1949. During the early 1950s, he became a leading scriptwriter for live television dramas, contributing six teleplays to Goodyear Television Playhouse (in 1953–1954), two to Medallion Theatre (1953–1954) and four to Playhouse 90 (1957–1959). He also wrote for The Philco Television Playhouse (1954), Producers' Showcase and Studio One. After Eileen Heckart appeared in The Haven (on Philco Television Playhouse), his 1953 play about a troubled marriage, Mosel and Heckart became friends, and he wrote several scripts especially for her, including the 1953 Other People's Houses (on Goodyear Television Playhouse) about a housekeeper caring for her senile father.

In 1997, Mosel recalled:

Paddy Chayefsky, Horton Foote, Sumner Locke Elliott, JP Miller and all of the group of writers that I knew, we grew up at the same time, and our eyes were on the theater. That was the Emerald City. That was the goal. Now, television came on after World War II, and television was a pauper. It had no money. No "self-respecting writer" would deign to write for television. Even drunken screenwriters wouldn't write for television. So who was there left? It was us. It was kids who would work for 65 cents. And so with a very patronizing attitude you thought, "Well, if I could make a few bucks doing that, it would give me time to write the great American play." It didn't take too much experience to realize that television was a medium all in itself, and that it was a career all in itself, and it was a thrilling one. But we stumbled into it by being snobs if I may say so. They would give anyone a chance. I look back on it, and I think, "Weren't we lucky to be there?" Because it was pure luck that we were there... It was the stillness before you went on the air that was so dramatic because everybody would be in place in plenty of time, but everybody would be silent. Nobody talking, nobody moving--the hands on the keys but not moving. The only thing moving was the second hand on the big clock, and then when it hit the top everybody started to move. It was very dramatic, that peace, that calm before you took the dive into it. It was a great thrilling moment and you suddenly loved every actor, and you just wanted them all to be rich and have children and go to happy graves.

Mosel's All the Way Home premiered in New York November 30, 1960, at the Belasco Theater to critical acclaim. In addition to winning a 1961 Pulitzer Prize, the play was nominated for a Tony Award. A stage adaptation of James Agee's novel A Death in the Family, it dramatizes the reactions of a Tennessee family to the father's accidental death in the summer of 1915. The play was also performed several times on television—in 1963, 1971 and 1981. In Denmark it was known as I havn and directed for Danish television by Clara Østø in 1959.

The movie adaptation of All The Way Home (1963) was filmed in the same Knoxville, Tennessee neighborhood where Agee was raised. Directed by Alex Segal, it starred Robert Preston, Jean Simmons and Pat Hingle.

Mosel wrote screenplays for the films Dear Heart, starring Glenn Ford and Geraldine Page, with Mosel seen in a cameo appearance as the Man in Lobby, and the popular Up the Down Staircase, based on the novel by Bel Kaufman and starring Sandy Dennis.

He was nominated for an Emmy Award for Outstanding Writing in a Drama Series for an episode of The Adams Chronicles, a PBS drama series based on the lives of presidents John Adams and John Quincy Adams and their families.

Many of Mosel's plays for television are available for viewing at The Paley Center for Media in New York City and Los Angeles.

=== Personal life ===
Mosel's death at age 86 of esophageal cancer came after 18 years of residency at Havenwood-Heritage Heights, a retirement community in Concord, New Hampshire, where he often lectured. He was preceded in death in 1995 by Raymond Tatro, McCall's magazine graphic designer; they were partners for more than 40 years.

== Legacy ==
Mosel's $100,000 gift to Havenwood-Heritage Heights was used to finance an auditorium, named Tad's Place, for future speakers to the community.

== Bibliography ==
- Mosel, Tad (1956). Other People's Houses; Six Television Plays. New York: Simon and Schuster. OCLC 232773.
- Mosel, Tad; Macy, Gertrude (1978). Leading Lady: The World and Theater of Katharine Cornell. Boston: Little, Brown. ISBN 0-316-58537-8.
