= Muriel Resnik =

American dramatist

Muriel Resnik (August 15, 1915 – March 6, 1995) was an American playwright and novelist. She was known for her comedy play Any Wednesday, performed for the first time on Broadway in 1964 and starring Sandy Dennis, Don Porter, Gene Hackman, and Rosemary Murphy. Its success took Resnik by surprise, and in 1966 a film of the same name was made, starring Jane Fonda and Jason Robards as the main characters.

Resnik wrote such novels as Life Without Father, House Happy and The Girl in the Turquoise Bikini, which was also adapted to film with the title, How Sweet It Is! (1968). She later wrote Son of Any Wednesday and, in 1992, The Garden Club, her first murder mystery.

She was working on a sequel to The Garden Club at the time of her death on March 6, 1995, in New Haven, Connecticut of heart failure after a long illness.
