= Love with the Proper Stranger =

1963 film by Robert Mulligan

- Theatrical release poster
- Directed by: Robert Mulligan
- Written by: Arnold Schulman
- Produced by: Alan J. Pakula
- Starring: Natalie Wood; Steve McQueen; Edie Adams; Herschel Bernardi; Tom Bosley
- Cinematography: Milton R. Krasner
- Edited by: Aaron Stell
- Music by: Elmer Bernstein
- Distributed by: Paramount Pictures
- Release date: December 25, 1963
- Running time: 102 minutes
- Country: United States
- Language: English
- Box office: $3.6 million (rentals)

Love with the Proper Stranger is a 1963 American romantic drama film made by Pakula-Mulligan Productions and Boardwalk Productions and released by Paramount Pictures. It was directed by Robert Mulligan and produced by Alan J. Pakula from a screenplay by Arnold Schulman.

The film stars Natalie Wood, Steve McQueen, Edie Adams, Herschel Bernardi and Harvey Lembeck. The film also marked the screen debut of Tom Bosley and features a brief, uncredited appearance by the director's younger brother Richard Mulligan, who later became a well-known television actor. The film received five Academy Award nominations including Best Actress (for Wood). The film was shot in black and white.

The film addresses themes of abortion, norms of conventional marriage and adulthood.

== Plot ==
A first generation Italian-American, Angie Rossini, a salesclerk at Macy's Manhattan department store, finds herself pregnant after a one-night stand with part-time musician, Rocky Papasano. When she confronts him at a musician union hiring hall, her only request is that Rocky help fund and find the name of a doctor who is willing to perform an abortion. Meanwhile, Angie is being pressured by her working-class older brothers to marry Anthony, an unappealing but successful restaurateur.

Rocky and Angie scrape up enough money for the abortion but are confronted by Angie's brothers, who chase them through the neighborhood. Rocky is able to sneak into his father's upholstery workshop, where the two discuss life, their mistakes and future prospects. When he and Angie meet the crude abortion provider on a Saturday in a deserted part of the New York City Meatpacking District (who turns out not to be a doctor but a back-room abortionist), Rocky refuses to let her go through with the dangerous procedure, much to the relief of Angie, who rests from the trauma in Rocky's ex-girlfriend's apartment.

The maturity he shows in doing this brings them closer, and Angie grows to respect him. After meeting her brothers, Rocky (who was given the requisite black eye by the oldest brother) decides to "take his medicine" by agreeing to marry her. Angie, who has more romantic aspirations in life, is insulted by the insinuation of marriage-by-duty and refuses. Angie wants romance, with "bells and banjos".

As an act of independence, Angie moves out of her family home, much to the chagrin of her immigrant mother. She begins dating the restaurateur, Anthony, who offers to marry her (and claim the baby as his own). By acting aloof, she confuses and attracts Rocky back to Macy's, where he inquires about her condition. When Rocky mentions marriage once again, Angie invites him to "just come over for dinner" at her apartment.

The dinner is structured as a "date night" with a well-prepared meal and cocktails. Rocky is impressed with her ability as a homemaker, but even more impressed by her well-dressed and sexy appearance. After two stiff drinks, he makes crude advances on her and is rejected yet again. Angie says she does not want to make the same mistake again, citing the "bells and banjos" she expects in her relationships, and that after all the time spent together, she actually "likes him." They quarrel, and the sobbing Angie throws him out of the apartment, slamming the door. The next day, Rocky wins her heart by waiting for her outside the crowded Macy's, holding a comic protest sign, "Better Wed Than Dead", ringing bells and playing a banjo.

== Cast ==
- Natalie Wood as Angie Rossini
- Steve McQueen as Rocky Papasano
- Edie Adams as Barbie
- Herschel Bernardi as Dominick Rossini
- Harvey Lembeck as Julio Rossini
- Penny Santon as Mama Rossini
- Virginia Vincent as Anna
- Marilyn Chris as Gina

and introducing

- Tom Bosley as Anthony Columbo
- Richard S. Castellano as Extra

== Production ==
The film was based on an original idea of Arnold Schulman. He pitched the project to various studios, but could not sell it. He wrote the script on spec. His agent Abe Lastfogel attached Natalie Wood and sold the script to Paramount. Warren Beatty, then living with Natalie Wood, was offered the lead but turned it down. Then Alan J. Pakula and Robert Mulligan agreed to make the film and the studio was willing to make it with Steve McQueen even though he was not established as a star yet.

Schulman said "We did it like a play. I was involved like a playwright all the way through. There was mutual respect. Rehearsals on the set, everything."

== Accolades ==
Award	Category	Nominee(s)	Result
Academy Awards	Best Actress	Natalie Wood	Nominated
Academy Awards	Best Story and Screenplay – Written Directly for the Screen	Arnold Schulman	Nominated
Academy Awards	Best Art Direction – Black-and-White	Hal Pereira, Roland Anderson, Sam Comer and Grace Gregory	Nominated
Academy Awards	Best Cinematography – Black-and-White	Milton Krasner	Nominated
Academy Awards	Best Costume Design – Black-and-White	Edith Head	Nominated
Golden Globe Awards	Best Actor in a Motion Picture – Drama	Steve McQueen	Nominated
Golden Globe Awards	Best Actress in a Motion Picture – Drama	Natalie Wood	Nominated
Laurel Awards	Top Drama		4th Place
Laurel Awards	Top Female Dramatic Performance	Natalie Wood	Nominated
Mar del Plata International Film Festival	Best Film	Robert Mulligan	Nominated
Mar del Plata International Film Festival	Best Actress	Natalie Wood	Won
Writers Guild of America Awards	Best Written American Comedy	Arnold Schulman	Nominated

== See also ==
- List of American films of 1963
- 1963 in film

== Notes ==
- McGilligan, Patrick (1997). "Arnold Schulman: Nothing but Regrets". Backstory 3 : interviews with screenwriters of the 1960s. Berkeley: University of California Press. pp. 298–327.
