= Alan J. Pakula =

American film director, writer and producer (1928–1998)

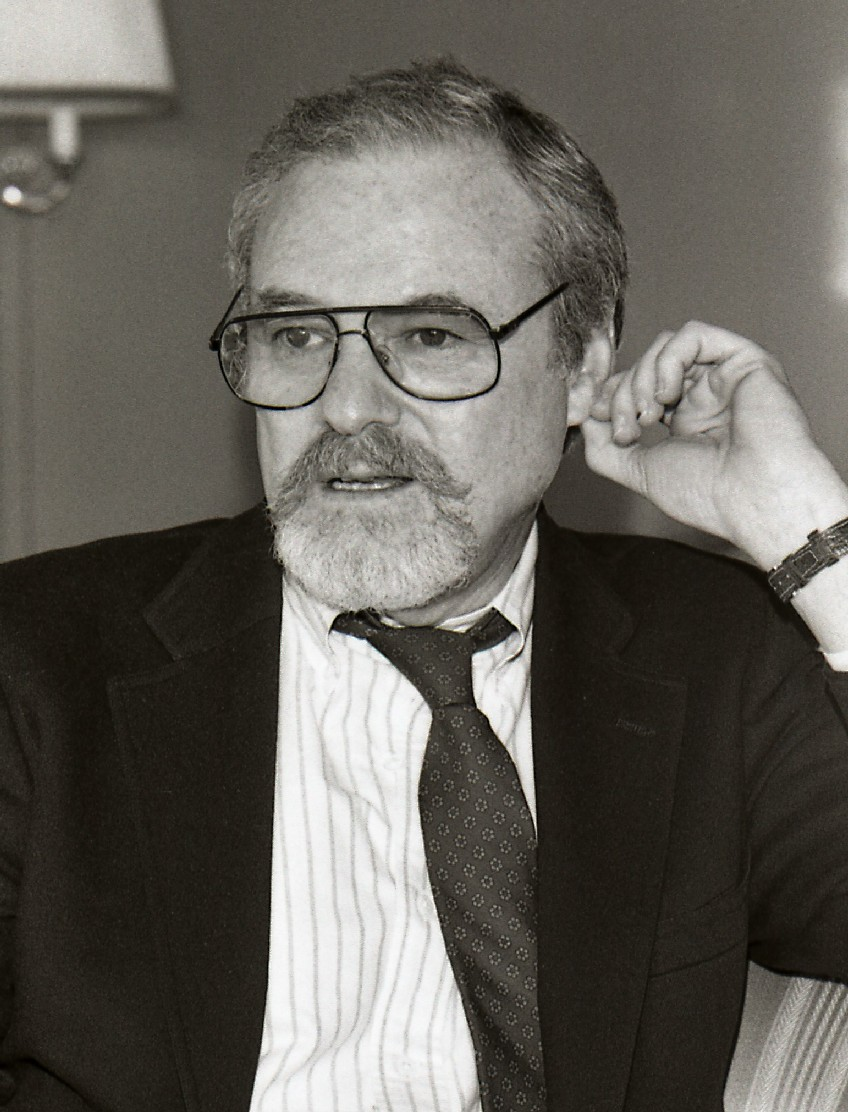
- Pakula in 1990
- Born: Alan Jay Pakula; April 7, 1928; The Bronx, New York City, U.S.
- Died: November 19, 1998 (aged 70); Melville, New York, U.S.
- Education: Yale University
- Occupations: Film director; screenwriter; producer
- Years active: 1957–1998
- Notable work: Klute; The Parallax View; All the President's Men; Comes a Horseman; Starting Over; Sophie's Choice; Presumed Innocent; The Pelican Brief
- Spouses: Hope Lange (m. 1963; div. 1971) Hannah Cohn Boorstin (m. 1973)

Alan Jay Pakula (/pəˈkuːlə/; April 7, 1928 – November 19, 1998) was an American film director, screenwriter, and producer. Associated with the New Hollywood movement, his best-known works include his critically acclaimed "paranoia trilogy": the neo-noir mystery Klute (1971), the conspiracy thriller The Parallax View (1974), and the Watergate scandal drama All the President's Men (1976). His other notable films included Comes a Horseman (1978), Starting Over (1979), Sophie's Choice (1982), Presumed Innocent (1990), and The Pelican Brief (1993).

Pakula received Academy Award nominations for Best Director for All the President's Men and Best Adapted Screenplay for Sophie's Choice. He was also nominated for Best Picture for producing To Kill a Mockingbird (1962). Additionally, he was a BAFTA Award, Golden Globe Award, and Directors Guild of America Award nominee.

Pakula's films often dealt with psychological and political themes. His obituary in The New York Times stated Pakula made "different kinds of movies, all of them intended to entertain, but the thread connecting many of them was a style that emphasized and explored the psychology and motivations of his characters." He was the subject of the 2023 documentary Alan Pakula: Going for Truth.

== Early life and education ==
Pakula was born in The Bronx, New York, to Polish Jewish parents, Jeanette (née Goldstein) and Paul Pakula. He was educated at The Hill School in Pottstown, Pennsylvania, and Yale University, where he majored in drama.

== Career ==
Pakula started his Hollywood career as an assistant in the cartoon department at Warner Bros. In 1957, he undertook his first production role for Paramount Pictures. In 1962, he produced To Kill a Mockingbird, for which he was nominated for an Academy Award for Best Picture. Pakula had a successful professional relationship as the producer of movies directed by Mockingbird director Robert Mulligan from 1957 to 1968. In 1969, he directed his first feature, The Sterile Cuckoo, starring Liza Minnelli.

=== Paranoia trilogy ===
In 1971, Pakula released the first installment of what would informally come to be known as his "paranoia trilogy." Klute, the story of a relationship between a private eye (played by Donald Sutherland) and a call girl (played by Jane Fonda, who won an Oscar for her performance), was a commercial and critical success. This was followed in 1974 by The Parallax View starring Warren Beatty, a labyrinthine post-Watergate thriller involving political assassinations. The film has been noted for its experimental use of hypnotic imagery in a celebrated film-within-a-film sequence in which the protagonist is inducted into the Parallax Corporation, whose main, although secret, enterprise is domestic terrorism.

Finally, in 1976, Pakula rounded out the "trilogy" with All the President's Men, based on the bestselling account of the Watergate scandal written by Bob Woodward and Carl Bernstein, played by Robert Redford and Dustin Hoffman, respectively. It was another commercial hit, considered by many critics and fans to be one of the best political thrillers of the 1970s.

=== Subsequent films ===
Pakula scored another hit in 1982 with Sophie's Choice, starring Meryl Streep. His screenplay, based on the novel by William Styron, was nominated for an Academy Award. Later commercial successes included Presumed Innocent, based on the bestselling novel by Scott Turow, and The Pelican Brief, an adaptation of John Grisham's bestseller. His final film was the thriller The Devil's Own, where he reunited with Harrison Ford.

== Personal life ==
From October 19, 1963, until 1971, Pakula was married to actress Hope Lange. He was married to his second wife, author Hannah Pakula (formerly Hannah Cohn Boorstin) from 1973 until his death in 1998.

He had two stepchildren from his marriage with Hope Lange, Christopher and Patricia Murray, and three stepchildren from his second marriage. They are Louis, Robert, and Anna Boorstin. He spoke very openly about his stepson Robert's battle with depression.

== Death ==
On November 19, 1998, Pakula was driving on the Long Island Expressway in Melville, New York, when a driver in front of him hit a metal pipe, causing it to crash through Pakula's windshield and strike him in the head. His car swerved off the road and into a fence. He was taken to North Shore University Hospital, where he was pronounced dead.

== Filmography ==
Year	Title	Director	Producer	Writer
1969	The Sterile Cuckoo	Yes	Yes	No
1971	Klute	Yes	Yes	No
1973	Love and Pain and the Whole Damn Thing	Yes	Yes	No
1974	The Parallax View	Yes	Yes	No
1976	All the President's Men	Yes	No	No
1978	Comes a Horseman	Yes	No	No
1979	Starting Over	Yes	Yes	No
1981	Rollover	Yes	No	No
1982	Sophie's Choice	Yes	Yes	Yes
1986	Dream Lover	Yes	Yes	No
1987	Orphans	Yes	Yes	No
1989	See You in the Morning	Yes	Yes	Yes
1990	Presumed Innocent	Yes	No	Yes
1992	Consenting Adults	Yes	Yes	No
1993	The Pelican Brief	Yes	Yes	Yes
1997	The Devil's Own	Yes	No	No

Producer only
Year	Title	Director
1957	Fear Strikes Out	Robert Mulligan
1962	To Kill a Mockingbird	Robert Mulligan
1963	Love with the Proper Stranger	Robert Mulligan
1965	Baby the Rain Must Fall	Robert Mulligan
1965	Inside Daisy Clover	Robert Mulligan
1967	Up the Down Staircase	Robert Mulligan
1968	The Stalking Moon	Robert Mulligan

== Awards and nominations received by Pakula's directed films ==
Year	Film	Academy Awards		BAFTA Film Awards		Golden Globe Awards	
Year	Film	Nominations	Wins	Nominations	Wins	Nominations	Wins
1969	The Sterile Cuckoo	2		1		1	
1971	Klute	2	1	1		2	1
1976	All the President's Men	8	4	10		4	
1978	Comes a Horseman	1					
1979	Starting Over	2				4	
1982	Sophie's Choice	5	1	2		3	1
Total		20	6	14		14	2

Directed Academy Award performances
Under Pakula's direction, these actors have received Academy Award nominations and wins for their performances in their respective roles.

Year	Performer	Film	Result
Academy Award for Best Actress
1970	Liza Minnelli	The Sterile Cuckoo	Nominated
1972	Jane Fonda	Klute	Won
1980	Jill Clayburgh	Starting Over	Nominated
1983	Meryl Streep	Sophie's Choice	Won
Academy Award for Best Supporting Actor
1977	Jason Robards	All the President's Men	Won
1979	Richard Farnsworth	Comes a Horseman	Nominated
Academy Award for Best Supporting Actress
1977	Jane Alexander	All the President's Men	Nominated
1980	Candice Bergen	Starting Over	Nominated
