= How Sweet It Is! =

1968 film by Jerry Paris

- Directed by: Jerry Paris
- Screenplay by: Jerry Belson; Garry Marshall
- Based on: The Girl in the Turquoise Bikini; 1961 novel by Muriel Resnik
- Produced by: Jerry Belson; Garry Marshall
- Starring: James Garner; Debbie Reynolds; Maurice Ronet; Penny Marshall
- Cinematography: Lucien Ballard
- Edited by: Bud Molin
- Music by: Pat Williams
- Production company: Cherokee Productions
- Distributed by: National General Pictures
- Release date: August 1968
- Running time: 99 minutes
- Country: United States
- Language: English
- Box office: $2.7 million (rentals)

How Sweet It Is! is a 1968 comedy film starring James Garner and Debbie Reynolds, with a supporting cast including Terry-Thomas and Paul Lynde.

Garner plays a photographer who accompanies his wife and teenage son on an assignment in Paris, with both husband and wife struggling to stay faithful under extreme temptation. The film was written by producers Garry Marshall and Jerry Belson (adapting Muriel Resnik's novel The Girl in the Turquoise Bikini) and directed by Jerry Paris. Jimmy Webb wrote the title song, and Patrick Williams scored the sound track.

== Plot ==
Teenager David Henderson wants to tag along with his girlfriend Gloria and a group of American students touring France. His mother Jenny hates the idea until she manages to get her professional photographer husband Grif to document the group's travels for his company.

Jenny books passage for them all on an ocean liner, and a stay at a Riviera hotel, from Gilbert, a dishonest, shyster travel agent. On the ship, they are dismayed to be assigned bunk beds in separate, crowded rooms with many teenagers, and endure an emergency drill; there is little privacy.

On arrival in Paris, Jenny leaves her husband with the school tour group, traveling alone to the bogus address shown as their Riviera hotel, hundreds of miles away. When she arrives at the luxurious mansion, she acts like she owns the place. She is puzzled to find it is instead a private home owned by a wealthy lawyer, Phillipe Maspere, who is equally puzzled at her arrival.

Jenny is unable to contact the phony travel agent. Nevertheless, Phillipe, who is attracted to her, offers her an extended stay there at a reasonable price with just him and his manservant/ butler.

Phillipe turns out to be a notorious womanizer who tries to seduce Jenny at a wild poolside party, unsuccessfully.

Grif, meanwhile, becomes friendly with an attractive chaperone with the American student group in Paris. When he indirectly learns of his wife Jenny's situation (by seeing a picture in a newspaper), he panics and impulsively drives cross-country alone at night, on a stolen school bus to get her.

When Grif arrives, seeing Jenny in the pool with the Frenchman, he punches him. Storming off in the bus she follows on the back of the butler's tricycle. She catches up with Grif but, as they head back to the tour group's hotel, they are stopped by Italian patrolmen, since the bus was reported stolen.

Jenny is placed in a jail cell with prostitutes, who are then all bailed out by their pimp and taken to a very fine hotel. Jenny is shocked to see her son at the brothel. The family is eventually reunited and they return home.

== Cast ==
- James Garner as Grif Henderson
- Debbie Reynolds as Jenny Henderson
- Maurice Ronet as Philippe Maspere
- Alexandra Hay as Gloria
- Terry-Thomas as Gilbert Tilly
- Paul Lynde as The Purser
- Donald Losby as Davey Henderson
- Hilary Thompson as Linda a.k.a. "Bootsie"
- Marcel Dalio as Louis
- Gino Conforti as Agatzi
- Vito Scotti as The Chef
- Don Diamond as The Bartender
- Penny Marshall as School Girl
- Erin Moran as Little Girl at Phone Booth
- Walter Brooke as Haskell Wax
- Elena Verdugo as Vera Wax
- Jon Silo as Hotel Clerk
- Ann Morgan Guilbert as Bibi
- Mary Michael as Nancy Leigh (Chaperone)

== Production and release ==
How Sweet It Is! was one of the first productions for National General Pictures. The title is taken from a television catchphrase popularized in the 1950s by comedian Jackie Gleason.

Garner wrote in his memoirs that he "loved Debbie Reynolds. Loved Paul Lynde. Loved Terry Thomas. Hated the movie."

Upon its release in August 1968, the film received a mixed response with critics and audiences. According to Howard Thompson of The New York Times, "This tired, aimlessly frisky comedy ... is about as sweet as a dill pickle."

== See also ==
- List of American films of 1968
