= Al Hirshberg =

American sportswriter (1909–1973)

Albert Simon Hirshberg (May 10, 1909 – April 13, 1973) was an American writer and sportswriter whose work was published primarily from the 1930s to the 1960s. He is best known as the co-author of Jimmy Piersall's 1955 autobiography titled Fear Strikes Out: The Jimmy Piersall Story, which was later made into the 1957 film Fear Strikes Out, starring Anthony Perkins.

== Early life ==
He was born on May 10, 1909, the son of David Hirshberg. He served as an officer in the United States Navy in the South Pacific during World War II.

== Career ==
Hirshberg wrote several books on the history of the Boston Red Sox baseball team, and co-wrote dozens of other people's memoirs, often, but not exclusively, about baseball players and/or Boston area sports figures and teams. He worked for The Boston Post from 1930 to 1952 and the Boston Herald from 1964 to 1968.

In 1969 he collaborated with Ken Harrelson on Harrelson's autobiographical tome Hawk.

== Personal life ==
Hirshberg had two children from his marriage to Marjorie Littauer Hirshberg, to whom he was married for 31 years until her death in 1970. Hirshberg then married Bert Cohen Hirshberg (née Milstone), an editor of Bostonia and benefactor of Boston University. It was her second marriage. They had no children together. She died in a car accident on February 2, 2008.

Hirshberg had continued sportswriting until his death and had moved to Longboat Key, Florida for the winter. He died of a heart attack at a hospital in Sarasota, Florida on April 13, 1973, age 63.
