= Soldier Blue =

1970 film by Ralph Nelson

- Theatrical release poster
- Directed by: Ralph Nelson
- Screenplay by: John Gay
- Based on: Arrow in the Sun (1969 novel) by Theodore V. Olsen
- Produced by: Gabriel Katzka; Harold Loeb
- Starring: Candice Bergen; Peter Strauss; Donald Pleasence; John Anderson; Dana Elcar
- Cinematography: Robert B. Hauser; Arthur J. Ornitz
- Edited by: Alex Beaton
- Music by: Roy Budd
- Production company: Katzka-Loeb
- Distributed by: Embassy Pictures
- Release date: August 12, 1970
- Running time: 115 minutes
- Country: United States
- Language: English
- Box office: $1.2 million (North American rentals)

Soldier Blue is a 1970 American revisionist Western film directed by Ralph Nelson and starring Candice Bergen, Peter Strauss, and Donald Pleasence. Adapted by John Gay from the novel Arrow in the Sun by T. V. Olsen, it is inspired by events of the 1864 Sand Creek massacre in the Colorado Territory. Nelson and Gay intended to utilize the narrative surrounding the massacre as an allegory for the contemporary Vietnam War.

Released in August 1970, the film drew attention for its frank depictions of violence, specifically its graphic final sequence. Some film scholars have cited Soldier Blue as a critique of America's "archetypal art form [the Western]," with other interpretations ranging from it being an anti-war picture to an exploitation film.

== Plot ==
In 1877 Colorado Territory, a young woman, Cresta Lee, and young Colorado Private Honus Gant are joined together by fate when they are the only two survivors after their group is massacred by the Cheyenne. Gant is devoted to his country and duty; Lee, who has lived with the Cheyenne for two years, is scornful of Gant (she refers to him as "Soldier Blue" derisively) and declares that in this conflict she sympathizes with them. The two must now try to make it to Fort Reunion, the army camp, where Cresta's fiancé lieutenant McNair waits for her. As they travel through the desert with very low supplies, hiding from the Native Americans, they are spotted by a group of Kiowa horsemen. Under pressure from Cresta, Honus fights and seriously wounds the group's chief when the chief challenges him. Honus finds himself unable to kill the disgraced Kiowa leader, whose own men stab him, leaving Honus and Cresta alone. The ideological gulf between them is also revealed in their attitudes towards societal mores, with the almost-puritanical Honus disturbed by things Cresta barely notices.

The duo are pursued by a corrupt trader who sells guns to the Cheyenne, but whose latest shipment of weapons Honus has managed to destroy. An injured Honus finds himself in a cave where Cresta has left him to get help. She arrives at Fort Reunion, only to discover that her fiancé's cavalry unit plans to attack the peaceful Native American village of the Cheyenne the following day. She rides to the village in time to warn Spotted Wolf, the Cheyenne chief. The chief does not recognize the danger and, under a U.S. flag, rides out to extend a hand of friendship to the European American soldiers. The soldiers, however, obey the orders of their psychopathic commanding officer and open artillery fire on the village.

After a cavalry charge decimates the Native American men, the soldiers enter the village and begin to rape and kill the Cheyenne women. Honus attempts to halt the atrocities, to no avail, and he is later arrested for treason by his own comrades. Cresta attempts to lead the remaining women and children to safety, but her group is discovered and massacred, though Cresta herself survives and is arrested for treason by the soldiers. Honus is dragged away chained behind an army wagon while a despairing Cresta is left with the few Cheyenne survivors.

== Cast ==
- Candice Bergen as Kathy Maribel "Cresta" Lee
- Peter Strauss as Honus Gant
- Donald Pleasence as Isaac Q. Cumber
- John Anderson as Colonel Iverson
- Jorge Rivero as Spotted Wolf
- Dana Elcar as Captain Battles
- Bob Carraway as Lieutenant McNair
- Martin West as Lieutenant Spingarn
- James Hampton as Private Menzies
- Mort Mills as Sergeant O'Hearn
- Jorge Russek as Running Fox
- Ralph Nelson (credited as "Alf Elson") as Agent Long

== Production ==
The film provided the first motion picture account of the Sand Creek massacre, one of the most infamous incidents in the history of the American frontier, in which Colorado Territory militia under Colonel John M. Chivington massacred a defenseless village of Cheyenne and Arapaho on the Colorado Eastern Plains.

The account of the massacre is included as part of a longer fictionalized story about the escape of two white survivors from an earlier massacre of U.S. Cavalry troops by Cheyenne, and names of the actual historical characters were changed. Director Nelson stated that he was inspired to make the film based on the wars in Vietnam and Sơn Mỹ.

Principal photography began on October 28, 1969, with exterior photography taking place in Mexico. Arthur J. Ornitz was originally hired as the film's cinematographer, but was replaced by Robert B. Hauser several weeks into production. According to Bergen, a large van full of prosthetics was brought in during the filming of the violent battle sequences, full of dummy body parts and animatronics. Additionally, amputees from Mexico City were hired to serve as extras during the final massacre sequence.

== Release ==
Soldier Blue premiered in New York City on August 12, 1970, and opened in Los Angeles two days later on August 14, 1970.

=== Box office ===
The film was the third-most popular film at the British box office in 1971. It brought $1.2 million from the U.S./ Canada rentals. The title song, written and performed by Buffy Sainte-Marie, was released as a single and became a top ten hit in the UK as well as other countries in Europe and Japan during the summer of 1971.

== Reception ==
=== Contemporaneous ===
Multiple film critics said Soldier Blue evoked the My Lai massacre, which had been disclosed to the American public the previous year. In September 1970, Dotson Rader writing in The New York Times, remarked that Soldier Blue "must be numbered among the most significant, the most brutal and liberating, the most honest American films ever made."

Roger Ebert of the Chicago Sun-Times wrote of the film: "Soldier Blue is indeed savage, but it wears its cloak of "truth" self-consciously. It is supposed to be a pro-Indian movie, and at the end the camera tells us the story was true, more or less, and that the Army chief of staff himself called the massacre shown in the film one of the most shameful moments in American history." He added: "So it was, and of course we're supposed to make the connection with My Lai and take Soldier Blue as an allegory for Vietnam. But that just won't do. The film is too mixed up to qualify as a serious allegory about anything." The Time Out film guide called the film "a grimly embarrassing anti-racist Western about the U.S. Cavalry's notorious Sand Creek Indian massacre in 1864. In the interests of propaganda, one might just about stomach the way the massacre itself is turned into a gleefully exploitative gore-fest of blood and amputated limbs; but not when it's associated with a desert romance that's shot like an ad-man's wet dream, all soft focus and sweet nothings."

The film was criticized negatively by some. Joseph Running Wolf McCandless, a purported survivor of the Wounded Knee Massacre, claimed that seeing the film was "the most horrifying experience of my life".

=== Contemporary ===
Modern critics and scholars have alternately described Soldier Blue as a revisionist western anti-American, and as an exploitation film. In 2004, the BBC named it "one of the most significant American films ever made." British author and critic P.B. Hurst, who wrote the 2008 book The Most Savage Film: Soldier Blue, Cinematic Violence and the Horrors of War, said of the film:

A good number of critics in 1970 believed that Soldier Blue had set a new mark in cinematic violence, as a result of its graphic scenes of Cheyenne women and children being slaughtered, and had thus lived up – or down – to its U.S. poster boast that it was "The Most Savage Film in History." A massive hit in Great Britain and much of the rest of the world, Soldier Blue was, in the words of its maverick director, Ralph Nelson, "not a popular success" in the United States. This probably had less to do with the picture's groundbreaking violence, and more to do with the fact that it was the U.S. Cavalry who were breaking new ground. For Nelson's portrayal of the boys in blue as blood crazed maniacs, who blow children's brains out and women, shattered for ever one of America's most enduring movie myths – that of the cavalry as good guys riding to the rescue – and rendered Soldier Blue one of the most radical films in the history of American cinema. The film's failure in its homeland might also have had something to do with the perception in some quarters – prompted by production company publicity material – that it was a deliberate Vietnam allegory.

Retrospective analysis has placed the film in a tradition of motion pictures of the early 1970s – such as Ulzana's Raid (1972) – which were used as "natural venues for remarking on the killing of women and children by American soldiers" in light of the political conflicts of the era. However, the "visual excesses" of the film's most violent sequences have been similarly criticized as exploitative by modern critics as well.

In a 2005 article on the film in Uncut, Kevin Maher deemed it "a bloody 1970 exploitation western ... [which] has a gore-count worthy of Cannibal Holocaust." TV Guide awarded the film one out of five stars, writing: "Soldier Blue suffers from Bergen's weak performance and Strauss is bland, but the parallel between the 1864 Sand Creek Massacre and Vietnam's My Lai incident is disturbing and the film's depiction of Native American life is an explicit attempt to move past Hollywood stereotypes."

Film scholar Christopher Frayling described Soldier Blue as a "much more angry film" than its contemporary Westerns, which "challenges the language of the traditional Western at the same time as its ideological bases." Frayling also praised its cinematography and visual elements in his 2006 book Spaghetti Westerns: Cowboys and Europeans from Karl May to Sergio Leone: "most critics succeeded in missing the really inventive sections of Soldier Blue, which involve Nelson's use of elaborate zooms, and of untraditional compositions, both of which subtly explore the relationship between the 'initiates' and the virgin land which surrounds them."

Recalling the film, star Candice Bergen commented that it was "a movie whose heart, if nothing else, was in the right place."

On the review aggregator website Rotten Tomatoes, 38% of 8 critics' reviews are positive, with an average rating of 5/10.

=== In culture ===
Artist Andrea Carlson's 2010 work "Soldier Blue" incorporates text and images from several cannibal films popular in the 1970s and 1980s.

== Works cited ==
- Frayling, Christopher (2006). Spaghetti Westerns: Cowboys and Europeans from Karl May to Sergio Leone. London: I.B. Tauris. ISBN 978-1-845-11207-3.
- Huebner, Andrew J. (2008). The Warrior Image: Soldiers in American Culture from the Second World War to the Vietnam Era. University of North Carolina Press. ISBN 978-0-807-83144-1.
- Hurst, P.B. (2008). The Most Savage Film: Soldier Blue, Cinematic Violence and the Horrors of War. McFarland. ISBN 978-0-7864-3710-8.
- Indick, William (2008). The Psychology of the Western: How the American Psyche Plays Out on Screen. Jefferson, North Carolina: McFarland. ISBN 978-0-786-43460-2.
- Maddrey, Joseph (2016). The Quick, the Dead and the Revived: The Many Lives of the Western Film. Jefferson, North Carolina: McFarland. ISBN 978-1-476-62549-2.
