= Gertrude Macy =

American writer, Broadway producer and manager

- Born: 1904; California
- Died: 1983 (aged 78–79); New York
- Known for: Broadway producer

Gertrude Macy (1904–18 October 1983), was an American writer, Broadway producer and manager.

== Biography ==
Gertrude Macy was born in Pasadena, California in 1904. She moved to New York and started her stage career as an assistant stage manager on the production The Age of Innocence in 1928. From there she produced a number of shows and reviews including the group One for the Money starring Alfred Drake and Gene Kelly in 1939, Two for the Show starring Eve Arden, Betty Hutton and Keenan Wynn in 1940 and the final part Three to Make Ready in 1946. The third show starred Ray Bolger, Arthur Godfrey, Gordon MacRae and Harold Lang.

Macy was also the producer on The Happiest Years and I Am a Camera in 1949 as well as Berlin Stories in 1952. Macy worked as the general manager for Katharine Cornell and co-wrote the book Leading Lady: The World and Theatre of Katharine Cornell with Tad Mosel. In her career she was the head of the American National Theater and Academy's international cultural exchange service.

Macy died in 1983 of cancer in New York City.
