= Captain Nice =

1967 American TV series

- Genre: Sitcom
- Created by: Buck Henry
- Starring: William Daniels; Alice Ghostley; Ann Prentiss
- Theme music composer: Vic Mizzy
- Composers: Vic Mizzy; Jerry Fielding
- Country of origin: United States
- Original language: English
- No. of seasons: 1
- No. of episodes: 15

Production
- Executive producer: Buck Henry
- Producer: Jay Sandrich
- Production location: Paramount Studios
- Cinematography: W. Wallace Kelley
- Running time: 30 minutes
- Production company: NBC Productions

Original release
- Network: NBC
- Release: January 9 – August 28, 1967

Captain Nice is an American television sitcom that ran from January 9, 1967, to August 28, 1967, Monday nights at 8:30 pm EST on NBC, opposite ABC's The Rat Patrol and CBS's The Lucy Show. The show was an unsuccessful attempt to cash in on the 1966 smash hit ABC TV version of Batman. A similar series on CBS, Mr. Terrific, also aired on Monday nights that season in the 8 pm EST time slot.

A single-issue comic book adaptation was published by Gold Key Comics in November 1967. Reruns of Captain Nice aired on Ha! (Comedy Central) in 1991.

== Plot ==
Riding the tide of the camp superhero craze of the 1960s, the show's premise involved police chemist Carter Nash (William Daniels), a mild-mannered mama's boy who discovered a secret formula that, when he drank it, transformed him in an explosive burst of smoke into Captain Nice.

Nash called himself "Captain Nice" in his first appearance when a bystander asked him who he was: his belt buckle was monogrammed "CN," and Nash later admitted, "It was all I could think of!" On that occasion the explosion that transformed him blew off most of his clothes, leaving him in long underwear and with the remnants of his shirt suggesting a cape.

Captain Nice didn't behave much differently from Carter. His costume consisted of white pajamas adorned with gold stars, red stripes on the pants, the words "Captain Nice" (initially misspelled "Captin" until a smaller 'A' was added) in blue across the chest, a red-white-and-blue belt with a gold buckle, and an over-sized red and blue cape, all lovingly sewn by his domineering mother who had basically cajoled Nash into his crime-fighting career. In some episodes he wore his regular glasses as Captain Nice, but in others he wore a domino mask, but still wore his glasses over the mask. Despite the kitschy garb, the very sight of Captain Nice somehow struck fear into the hearts of criminals.

His superpowers included superhuman strength, invulnerability, and the ability to fly, although Nash had a great fear of heights, and his naturally meek personality did not improve when he drank his super serum.

Carter had a would-be girlfriend in the police department, meter maid Sergeant Candy Kane, although he seemed mostly oblivious to her obvious attentions.

== Cast ==
- William Daniels as Captain Nice / Carter Nash
- Alice Ghostley as Mrs. Nash
- Ann Prentiss as Sergeant Candy Kane
- Liam Dunn as Mayor Finney
- Byron Foulger as Mr. Nash

== Production ==
The series was created by Buck Henry, who was a co-creator of the hit series Get Smart. The show's premise is similar to that of CBS's Mr. Terrific, which preceded Captain Nice on Monday nights.

Ann Prentiss, younger sister of actress Paula and sister-in-law of actor Richard Benjamin, played Candy.

Alice Ghostley (who was only three years Daniels' senior) played Carter's mother. She later won fame as the witch Esmerelda on Bewitched, and as neighbor Bernice on the comedy Designing Women.

Carter's father, whose face was never seen, was portrayed by character actor Byron Foulger. In a reverse of Foulger's ubiquity and familiarity in films, his appearances in this series generally found him hidden behind a newspaper and not making a sound.

== Episode list ==
Episode #	Episode title	Original airdate	Production #	Short Summary
1-1	"The Man Who Flies Like A Pigeon" (pilot)	January 9, 1967	LP35005	Carter tries to explain the importance of his new formula.
1-2	"How Sheik Can You Get?"	January 16, 1967	LP35006	Captain Nice helps rescue a woman from Sheik Abdul.
1-3	"That Thing"	January 23, 1967	LP35007	Caterpillar develops a ravenous appetite and super powers when it accidentally drinks Nice's secret formula.
1-4	"That Was the Bridge That Was"	February 6, 1967	LP35008	Carter searches for con artists who built a faulty bridge and kidnapped Mayor Finley.
1-5	"The Man With Three Blue Eyes"	February 20, 1967	LP35010	A mentalist is kidnapped by thugs who think he can find a fortune in stolen money.
1-6	"Is Big Town Burning?"	February 27, 1967	LP35011	Carter risks being unmasked as Captain Nice in order to reveal the identity of an arsonist.
1-7	"Don't Take Any Wooden Indians"	March 6, 1967	LP35013	Captain Nice prevents a disgruntled explorer from murdering his benefactor.
1-8	"That's What Mothers Are For"	March 13, 1967	LP35014	Carter is dismissed in an economy move, and Mrs. Nash retaliates by stealing his costume.
1-9	"Whatever Lola Wants"	March 20, 1967	LP35012	While trying to stop a jailbreak, Captain Nice is slipped a pill that makes him appear intoxicated.
1-10	"Who's Afraid of Amanda Woolf?"	March 27, 1967	LP35015	Captain Nice breaks up a potential massacre, so in retaliation the gang invades the Nash home.
1-11	"The Week They Stole Payday"	April 3, 1967	LP35016	Carter discovers that the Bigtown payroll has been replaced with counterfeit money.
1-12	"It Tastes Okay, But Something's Missing"	April 10, 1967	LP35017	Carter Nash lacks the secret formula he needs to turn into Captain Nice in order to prevent a robbery.
1-13	"May I Have the Last Dance?"	April 17, 1967	LP35009	Carter and Sergeant Kane are captured by fur thieves.
1-14	"One Rotten Apple"	April 24, 1967	LP35018	A nightclub owner (played by Bob Newhart) must be protected from potential killers.
1-15	"Beware of Hidden Prophets"	May 1, 1967	LP35019	Carter is fired when a quack mentalist predicts a criminal will escape from jail.

== Home media ==
Captain Nice was released in Germany by Pidax film media Ltd (AL! VE) on Region 2 DVD on August 5, 2011 under the title Das Geheimnis der blauen Tropfen - Die komplette Serie [The Secret of the Blue Drops - The Complete Series]. Audio is German language only, with no English language option. Episodes are reportedly heavily edited with some only running 14 minutes in length per episode.
