= Patrick Bedford =

Irish stage and television actor (1932–1999)

Patrick Bedford (May 30, 1932, Dublin, Ireland – November 20, 1999; New York City, United States) was an Irish stage and television actor.

He began his career in the 1950s at the Gate Theatre in Dublin then under the direction of Hilton Edwards and Michael MacLiammoir, including productions of Chekhov, Shaw and Shakespeare, and later worked on the stage and in television in England. In London he appeared on stage and TV in Edgar Wallace Mystery Theatre and in several TV plays.

He was in the original stage production of Brian Friel's Philadelphia, Here I Come! at the Gaiety Theatre Dublin in September 1964, in the London West End transfer at the Criterion Theatre, and in the Broadway NY transfer. His performance earned him a Tony Award nomination in 1965 for Best Actor (with Donal Donnelly). and an Outer Circle Critics Award.

Bedford was a key figure in episode four ("A Death In England") of the ABC Weekend Television sci-fi drama Undermind on UK TV in 1965. He had a small part in Orson Welles's film Chimes at Midnight (1965) and a starring role with Sandy Dennis in the 1967 film Up the Down Staircase about life in a NYC high school, and was in The Next Man (1976).

He then mainly worked in theatre in the US, on both coasts, but mainly in New York City both on and off Broadway. He was in the premiere of Tennessee Williams's last play Small Craft Warnings at the New Theatre New York in 1972. Other stage appearances included Brian Friel's The Mundy Scheme in New York in 1969 and as John Adams in the nationwide tour of the musical 1776. He appeared in over 200 stage productions throughout his career.

He died November 20, 1999, in Manhattan New York City of cancer six weeks after entering the hospital. He was 67.
