= The Stalking Moon =

1968 American Western film

- Theatrical release poster
- Directed by: Robert Mulligan
- Screenplay by: Alvin Sargent
- Adaptation by: Wendell Mayes
- Based on: The Stalking Moon by Theodore V. Olsen
- Produced by: Alan J. Pakula
- Starring: Gregory Peck; Eva Marie Saint; Robert Forster; Noland Clay
- Cinematography: Charles Lang
- Edited by: Aaron Stell
- Music by: Fred Karlin
- Production company: Pakula-Mulligan Productions
- Distributed by: National General Pictures
- Release date: December 25, 1968
- Running time: 109 minutes
- Country: United States
- Language: English
- Budget: $5 million
- Box office: $2.6 million (rentals)

The Stalking Moon is a 1968 American Western film in Technicolor directed by Robert Mulligan and starring Gregory Peck and Eva Marie Saint. It is based on the 1965 novel by T. V. Olsen.

== Plot ==
U.S. Army soldiers round up a group of Apaches, mostly women and children. Surprisingly, they find among them a white woman and her half-Indian son.

Sam Varner is a scout retiring from the Army to his ranch in New Mexico. He agrees to escort Sarah Carver and her son after she begs him. She wants to leave immediately rather than wait five days for a military escort.

Sam takes them to a stagecoach stop called Hennessy. The boy runs away during the night. Varner and Sarah go looking for him as a dust storm begins. They find the boy and then hole up (literally) to wait out the storm.

When they return to the station, everyone there is dead, killed by the boy's Indian warrior father, Salvaje. Salvaje is greatly feared even among his own people - and with good reason: he is known to be a silent and ruthless killer. Salvaje means "Ghost" in Apache or, in their own tongue, "He Who Is Not Here", meaning a dead man. (Note: "Salvaje" is actually Spanish for "savage." The genuine Apache equivalent for "ghost" would be "gode" which is a spirit that haunts dreams.)

Sam is upset that Sarah's impatience to leave has cost the people at the station their lives. When the stagecoach does arrive, Sam puts Sarah and her son on it and follows them to a rail station called Silverton. He trades government letters of transport for train tickets to Topeka, Kansas.

After some careful consideration, Sam decides to invite Sarah and her son to accompany him to his ranch where she can cook for him and an old man, Ned (Russell Thorson), who takes care of the ranch. Sam sells his horse and they take the train to New Mexico.

They uneasily try to coexist. Sarah and her son are not talkative despite Sam's best efforts. His friend Nick, a half-breed scout he has been friends with for ten years, shows up. Nick tells him that Salvaje killed everyone at Silverton and even killed Sam's old horse. It's apparent that Salvaje is coming to the ranch to retake his son.

Ned goes outside to feed his dog and finds it killed with an arrow. In a blind rage, he runs into the trees after Salvaje. Sam tries to bring him back but can't find him. Shortly after, he hears Ned's death scream. Sam decides to go after Salvaje and create an opportunity for Nick to get a clear shot. But, when Sam is being tracked, Nick jumps up to warn him and Salvaje kills him. Nick dies in Sam's arms.

Salvaje enters the ranch house through a window. Sam blows out the kerosene lamp in order to hide in a dark corner. Sam shoots at him with a rifle and Salvaje flees, but he leaves a trail of blood.

Sam trails him and steps into a booby-trap that Salvaje has rigged with a knife. Sam is stabbed in the left thigh and bleeds profusely enough that he has to apply a tourniquet. The two men fight and eventually Sam shoots Salvaje three times as the warrior falls atop him, dying.

Sam manages to walk, stumble, and crawl back to the house, where Sarah rushes out to help him.

== Cast ==
- Gregory Peck as Sam Varner
- Eva Marie Saint as Sarah Carver
- Robert Forster as Nick Tana
- Noland Clay as Boy
- Russell Thorson as Ned
- Frank Silvera as Major
- Lonny Chapman as Purdue
- Lou Frizzell as Stationmaster
- Henry Beckman as Sergeant Rudabaugh
- Charles Tyner as Dace
- Richard Bull as Doctor
- Sandy Brown Wyeth as Rachel
- Joaquín Martínez as Julio
- Boyd "Red" Morgan as Shelby
- Nathaniel Narcisco as Salvaje
- James Olson as Cavalry Officer

== Production ==
Film rights to the novel were purchased in 1965 by Carthay Center Productions, the production arm of the National General Theatre chain. The project was originally assigned to screenwriter Wendell Mayes who was also going to produce with George Stevens to direct. Gregory Peck was going to star. Mayes and Stevens dropped out, and Peck brought in director Robert Mulligan and producer Alan J. Pakula, who he had previously worked on To Kill a Mockingbird. A draft of the script was written by Horton Foote, who wrote Mockingbird. Then another one was done by Alvin Sergeant.

Peck said, "The script appealed to me because it offered an interesting romance between two mature people against a background of suspense and action."

Filming started 8 January 1968. It was filmed on location in Red Rock Canyon National Conservation Area and Valley of Fire State Park, both in Nevada, and at the Samuel Goldwyn Studio in Hollywood.

== Reception ==
Vincent Canby of The New York Times wrote "There are some lovely individual things in The Stalking Moon—broad, Western landscapes, a moment in which Miss Saint suddenly catches her haggard look reflected in a train window, a scene in which Peck buys a railroad ticket at a desert crossing that explains the awful, dislocating distances on the frontier. Those, however, are random touches...Like Peck, the film moves stolidly forward with more dignity than excitement...Quite consciously, Mulligan and Alvin Sargent, who wrote the screenplay, have kept their focus on the poor whites, but unfortunately, none of them is especially interesting. They remain outlines for characters — the lonely frontiersman, the woman who has gone through horrors that are unspeakable (at least unspeakable in this film) to survive Indian captivity, and the small boy torn between two cultures."

FilmInk wrote the movie "was full of classy names – Eva Marie Saint, Robert Forster – and tried to be an elevated action movie but it was a box office disappointment and, truth be told, is a slightly flat effort." On the review aggregator website Rotten Tomatoes, 40% of 5 critics' reviews are positive.

== Home media ==
The Stalking Moon was released on DVD by Warner Home Video on August 26, 2008.

== See also ==
- List of American films of 1968
- Ulzana's Raid, a 1972 Western concerning an elusive, merciless Apache enemy but dealing with similar story elements in a more bleak and nihilistic manner.
- The Missing, a 2003 Western starring Tommy Lee Jones and Cate Blanchett that also featured an almost supernatural Apache antagonist.
- Trooper Hook, 1957 movie with a similar storyline.
