= T. V. Olsen =

American author

- Born: Theodore Victor Olsen; April 25, 1932; Rhinelander, Wisconsin
- Died: July 13, 1993 (aged 61); Rhinelander, Wisconsin
- Occupation: Author
- Spouse: Beverly Butler
- Writing career
- Genre: Western
- Notable awards: Golden Spur Award, 1992

Theodore Victor Olsen (April 25, 1932 – July 13, 1993) was an American western fiction author. The films The Stalking Moon and Soldier Blue were based on his works.

== Biography ==
Olsen's family migrated from Norway in 1901. Theodore Olsen was born on April 25, 1932, in Rhinelander, Wisconsin. He went to school in Rhinelander and began to write in high school. He began a Western novel at that time. He went to college in Stevens Point, Wisconsin.

Olsen finally finished his novel, Haven of the Hunted, and it was published in 1956. He also began to sell Western stories to pulp magazines at this time. Though he occasionally traveled west, he lived his whole life in Rhinelander and used exhaustive research to help accurately portray scenes of the West in his stories.

Olsen was married to fellow fiction author Beverly Butler.

Olsen died in Rhinelander on July 13, 1993, and several works were published posthumously.

Much of Olsen's family still lives in the Rhinelander region. They own a 300-acre (1.2 km^{2}) ranch with a century-old farm house and dairy barn.

== Bibliography ==
=== Novels ===
Western

- Haven of the Hunted, Ace Books 1956, new ed. Chivers Press 6/2000, ISBN 978-0-7540-3839-9
- The Man from Nowhere, Ace 1959, new ed. Chivers 3/1992, ISBN 978-0-7451-4515-0
- McGivern, Gold Medal Books 1960, new ed. Thorndike Press 4/2001, ISBN 978-0-7838-9412-6
- High Lawless, Fawcett 1960, new ed. Sagebush Westerns 7/2010, ISBN 978-0-7531-8518-6
- Gunswift, Fawcett Books 1960, new ed. Center Point Print 7/2006, ISBN 978-1-58547-795-1
- Brand of the Star, Fawcett Gold Medal 1961, new ed. Thorndike 4/2011, ISBN 978-1-4104-3589-7
- Ramrod Rider, Fawcett Gold Medal 1961, new ed. Center Point 9/2005, ISBN 978-1-58547-644-2
- Savage Sierra, Gold Medal 1963, new ed. Thorndike 3/1998, ISBN 978-0-7838-8420-2
- A Man Called Brazos, Fawcett Gold Medal 1964, new ed. Gunsmoke Westerns 8/2005, ISBN 978-1-4056-8040-0
- Canyon of the Gun, Fawcett Gold Medal 1965, new ed. Gunsmoke 9/2007, ISBN 978-1-4056-8149-0
- The Stalking Moon, Doubleday (publisher) 1965, new ed. Leisure Books 5/2010, ISBN 978-0-8439-4180-7
- The Hard Men, Star Weekly Novel 1966, new ed. Gunsmoke 7/2001, ISBN 978-0-7540-8132-6
- Blizzard Pass, Fawcett 1/1968, new ed. Thorndike 10/2004, ISBN 978-0-7862-6704-0
- Soldier Blue a.k.a. Arrow in the Sun, Star Weekly 1970, new ed. Thorndike ISBN 978-0-7862-5718-8
- The Burning Sky, Star Weekly 1/1971, new ed. Chivers 5/1998, ISBN 978-0-7451-8861-4
- A Man Named Yuma, Gold Medal 1/1971, new ed. Chivers 3/2011, ISBN 978-1-4084-9279-6
- Bitter Grass, Sphere Books 4/1971, ISBN 978-0-7221-6535-5
- There Was a Season, Doubleday 1972
- Summer of the Drums, Doubleday 1972
  - Alsatia EPI, ed. (1976). Les Tambours de l'été [Summer of the Drums]. Le Nouveau Signe de piste (in French). Vol. 14. Translated by François Mengin. Illustrated by Michel Gourlier.
- Mission to the West, Ace 1/1973, new ed. Leisure 9/1997, ISBN 978-0-8439-4308-5
- Eye of the Wolf, Sphere 3/1973, ISBN 978-0-7221-6538-6
- Run to the Mountain, Fawcett Gold Medal 1/1974, new ed. Gunsmoke 11/2008, ISBN 978-1-4056-8228-2
- Starbuck's Brand, Belmont Tower 1974, new ed. Leisure 11/1997, ISBN 978-0-8439-4326-9
- Day of the Buzzard, Fawcett Gold Medal 1/1976, new ed. Gunsmoke 1/2009, ISBN 1-4056-8232-9
- Westward They Rode, Ace 1/1976, new ed. Leisure 7/1996, ISBN 978-0-8439-4021-3
- Track the Man Down, Manor Books 1976, new ed. Leisure 10/1998, ISBN 0-8439-4369-6
- Bonner's Stallion, Fawcett Gold Medal 1/1977, new ed. Center Point May 2010, ISBN 978-1-60285-738-4
- Rattlesnake, Doubleday 2/1979, ISBN 978-0-385-14290-8
- The Lockhart Breed, Walker & Company 3/1982, ISBN 978-0-8027-4006-9
- Red is the River, Fawcett 1/1983, ISBN 978-0-449-12407-9
- Lazlo's Strike, Doubleday 1/1983, new ed. Gunsmoke 2/2010, ISBN 978-1-4084-6242-3
- Blood of the Breed, Ulverscroft Print 1/1985, ISBN 0-7089-1262-1
- Lonesome Gun, Fawcett 10/1985, ISBN 978-0-449-12808-4
- Blood Rage, Ballantine Books 6/1987, ISBN 978-0-449-13052-0
- A Killer is Waiting, Fawcett 2/1988, ISBN 978-0-449-13058-2
- Break the Young Land, Avon Books 1988, new ed. Center Point 9/2004, ISBN 1-58547-462-2
- Under the Gun, Fawcett 9/1989, ISBN 978-0-449-14621-7
- Keno, Chivers 4/1991, ISBN 978-0-7451-1336-4
- The Golden Chance, Fawcett 9/1992, ISBN 978-0-449-14803-7
- Deadly Pursuit, Thorndike 8/1995, ISBN 978-0-7862-0507-3, sequel to Golden Chance
- Treasures of the Sun, Five Star Publishing Westerns 11/1998, ISBN 978-0-7862-0995-8
- The Lost Colony, Five Star 9/1999, ISBN 978-0-7862-1582-9
- The Vanishing Herd, Five Star 5/2001, ISBN 978-0-7862-2113-4

Other Novels

- Brothers of the Sword, Berkley Books 1962 (Vikings)

=== Anthologies ===
- War Whoop and Battle Cry, collection of stories together with Clifton Adams, Clay Fisher and Luke Short, edited by Brian Garfield, Scholastic Corporation 1/1968
- Lone Hand (Frontier Stories), Thorndike 6/1998, ISBN 978-0-7862-0761-9
- Man without a Past (Frontier Stories), Five Star 11/2001, ISBN 978-0-7862-2732-7

=== Non-fiction ===
Rhinelander Country series

1. Roots of the North, Pineview Publishing 1979
2. Birth of a City, Pineview 1983, OCLC 9683380
3. Our First Hundred Years, Pineview 1983

== Filmography ==
- The Stalking Moon, 1968 directed by Robert Mulligan, with Gregory Peck and Eva Marie Saint
- Soldier Blue, 1970 directed by Ralph Nelson, with Peter Strauss and Candice Bergen

== Awards ==
- 1992: Golden Spur Award in the category Paperback Original for Golden Chance
