= Ann Prentiss =

American actress (1939–2010)

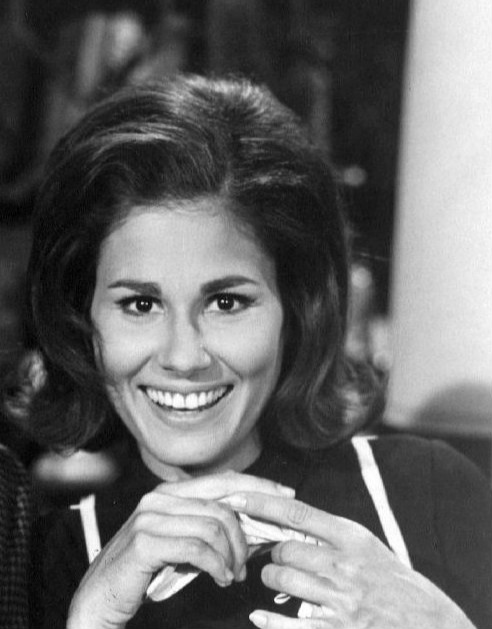
- Prentiss in 1970
- Born: Ann Elizabeth Ragusa; November 27, 1939; San Antonio, Texas, U.S.
- Died: January 12, 2010 (aged 70); Chowchilla, California, U.S.
- Other name: Ann Gardner
- Occupation: Actress
- Years active: 1962–1988
- Known for: My Stepmother Is an Alien; The Out-of-Towners; California Split; Any Wednesday; Captain Nice
- Relatives: Paula Prentiss (sister); Richard Benjamin (brother-in-law)

Ann Prentiss (November 27, 1939 – January 12, 2010) was an American actress.

== Early life ==
Prentiss was born Ann Elizabeth Ragusa in San Antonio, Texas, to Paulene (née Gardner) and Thomas J. Ragusa. Her father was of Sicilian descent. Her elder sister, Paula Prentiss, is also an actress.

== Career ==
Prentiss had many supporting roles in films and television series in the 1960s, 1970s and 1980s, including Get Smart's "The Little Black Book", Hogan's Heroes' "The Missing Klink" (1969), and on the Baretta episode "Half a Million Dollar Baby". She provided the voice of an alien species in the comedy film My Stepmother Is an Alien (1988), co-starring alongside Kim Basinger and Dan Aykroyd. Her other film roles included appearances in Any Wednesday (1966), If He Hollers, Let Him Go! (1968), The Out-of-Towners (1970), and California Split (1974), opposite George Segal and Elliott Gould.

In the 1967 NBC-TV series Captain Nice, created by Buck Henry, Prentiss played Police Sgt. Candy Kane, the girlfriend of the title character, a shy chemist/superhero portrayed by William Daniels.

== Personal life ==
=== Criminal conviction ===
Prentiss was convicted in a California court of a 1996 assault against her father, and a subsequent threat against members of her family. The district attorney claimed that Prentiss, while incarcerated on the assault charge, had attempted to hire another inmate to kill three people, including her father and actor-director Richard Benjamin, her brother-in-law. On July 23, 1997, the court sentenced her to 19 years in prison.

== Death ==
Prentiss died in prison on January 12, 2010.

== Filmography ==
=== Film ===
Year	Title	Role	Notes
1966	Any Wednesday	Miss Linsley	
1968	Assignment to Kill	Hotel Party Girl in Red Dress (uncredited)	
1968	If He Hollers, Let Him Go!	Thelma Wilson	Crime drama film
1970	The Out-of-Towners	Airline Stewardess	Comedy film
1974	California Split	Barbara Miller	
1988	My Stepmother Is an Alien	The Voice of Bag (voice)	Science fiction comedy

=== Television ===
Year	Title	Role	Notes
1962	I'm Dickens, He's Fenster	Dr. Else McClinton (as Ann Gardner)	Episode: "Part-Time Friend"
1966	Bewitched	Betty (uncredited)	Episode: "A Bum Raps"
1967	Captain Nice	Sgt. Candy Kane	15 episodes
1967	Mannix	Gwen Rogers	Episode: "Beyond the Shadow of a Dream"
1968	Get Smart	Nancy	Episode: "The Little Black Book: Part 1"; Episode: "The Little Black Book: Part 2"
1969	Hogan's Heroes	Ilse	Episode: "The Missing Klink"
1963–1969	The Virginian	Alice (as Ann Gardner); Geraldine Del Finnia	Episode: "Man of Violence"; Episode: "Crime Wave in Buffalo Springs"
1969	It Takes a Thief	Desk Clerk	Episode: "Catspaw"
1969	Hawaii Five-O	Lannie Devereaux (as Anne Prentiss)	Episode: "Not That Much Different"
1969	The Courtship of Eddie's Father	Kerry Allen	Episode: "Teacher's Pet"
1969	In Name Only	Jill Willis	ABC Movie of the Week
1970	The Name of the Game	Leona	Episode: "Jerry Wilde Is Drowning"
1970	The Bold Ones: The New Doctors	Elaine Stone	Episode: "This Will Really Kill You"
1970	McCloud	Officer Murdock	Episode: "Walk in the Dark"
1969–1971	Bonanza	Wilhelmina Calhoun; Wilhelmina Calhoun; Meena Calhoun	Episode: "Meena"; Episode: "The Horse Traders"; Episode: "Easy Come, Easy Go"
1972	Search	Ann Mulligan (as Ann Prentis)	Episode: "Moonrock"
1970–1972	Love, American Style	Judy Ricker (segment "Love and Las Vegas"); Yvonne (segment "Love and the Lady Barber"); Clara (segment "Love and the Hairy Excuse")	Episode: "Love and Las Vegas / Love and the Good Samaritan / Love and the Marriage Counselor"; Episode: "Love and the College Professor / Love and the Eyewitness / Love and the Lady Barber / Love and the Plumber"; Episode: "Love and the Hairy Excuse / Love and Lady Luck / Love and the Pick-Up Fantasy"
1973	The Lie	Elaine Fredericks	television film
1973–1974	Emergency!	Fran Lillington; Cindy's Mother	Episode: "Boot"; Episode: "Messin' Around"
1975	Baretta	Annie	Episode: "The Half-Million Dollar Baby"
1976	Switch	Cora	Episode: "Ain't Nobody Here Named Barney"
1976	Phillip and Barbara	Shirley	television film
1978	Quark	Gene / Jean (voice, uncredited)	7 episodes
1978–1979	Starsky and Hutch	Mrs. Carston	Episode: "The Trap"; Episode: "Ninety Pounds of Trouble"
1984	Masquerade	Mavis Kelly	Episode: "Winnings"
