= Fear Strikes Out =

1957 biographical sports film

- Directed by: Robert Mulligan
- Screenplay by: Ted Berkman; Raphael Blau
- Based on: Fear Strikes Out: The Jim Piersall Story; 1955 book by Jimmy Piersall and Al Hirshberg
- Produced by: Alan J. Pakula
- Starring: Anthony Perkins; Karl Malden
- Cinematography: Haskell B. Boggs
- Edited by: Aaron Stell
- Music by: Elmer Bernstein
- Distributed by: Paramount Pictures
- Release date: March 20, 1957
- Running time: 100 minutes
- Country: United States
- Language: English

Fear Strikes Out is a 1957 American biographical sports drama film depicting the life and career of American baseball All-Star player Jimmy Piersall. It is based on Piersall's 1955 memoir Fear Strikes Out: The Jim Piersall Story, co-written with Al Hirshberg. The film stars Anthony Perkins as Piersall and Karl Malden as his father, and it was the first film directed by Robert Mulligan.

This film is a Paramount Picture and was preceded by a 1955 TV version starring Tab Hunter.

The format of the film allows documentary footage of the stadium scenes to be used during the game sequences.

== Plot ==
Based on Jim Piersall's autobiography, the film traces his rise from the sandlots of Waterbury, Connecticut, to the Boston Red Sox professional baseball team. Karl Malden plays his domineering father who pushes him further and further.

Plagued by problems, Piersall marries Mary, but they live with his parents. When he is eventually chosen for the Red Sox, it is in the infield position of shortstop for which he has little experience. He calls his father to apologise.

Daunted by the huge crowd and the pressure of his father watching his first time at bat, the pressure nearly causes Piersall to strike out. But on the final pitch, he hits a home run. Rather than celebrate in a normal way, he instead runs to the backstop fence where his father sits, shouting "Look Dad, I told you I could do it". His teammates try to restrain him as he climbs the fence. He swings his bat at them. Eventually the police subdue him, and he is taken to a mental institution.

After a long period of therapy, Piersall realizes that he has excelled in baseball to please his father, not for his own gratification.

Piersall went on to play in 17 major-league seasons with five different franchises, predominantly in the American League, during the 1950–1967 seasons.

== Cast ==
- Anthony Perkins as Jim Piersall
- Karl Malden as John Piersall
- Norma Moore as Mary Piersall
- Adam Williams as Dr. Brown
- Perry Wilson as Mrs. Piersall
- Peter J. Votrian as young Jim Piersall
- Richard Bull as Reporter Slade (uncredited)
- Bart Burns as Joe Cronin (uncredited)
- Edd Byrnes as Boy in Car Assisting Jimmy Up Stairway (uncredited)
- Art Gilmore as Broadcaster (voice, uncredited)
- Brian G. Hutton as Bernie Serwill (uncredited)
- Morgan Jones as Sandy Allen (uncredited)
- Bing Russell as Ballplayer Holding Trophy (uncredited)
- Gary Vinson as High School Ballplayer (uncredited)

== 1955 TV version ==
The film was based on the book by Piersall and Al Hirshberg which had been adapted for TV in 1955 for the show Climax!.

Rights to the book were bought in July 1955. The television version starred Tab Hunter as Piersall, Mona Freeman as his wife, John Conte as a psychiatrist, and Robert Armstrong as his father. Herbert Swope directed and Martin Manulis produced.

The New York Times called the television play version "absorbing" and praised Hunter's portrayal of Piersall as "perceptive and believable." Hunter tried to get his studio, Warner Bros., to buy the film rights but these were purchased by another studio, Paramount Pictures, for $50,000. Mel Goldberg, who wrote the TV version, was hired to do the screenplay.

Hunter had a romantic relationship with Anthony Perkins. He says this relationship practically ended after Perkins took the role of Piersall in the film version without telling him beforehand, as Hunter had also been interested to portray the role of Piersall again in the film version.

== Awards and honors ==
Robert Mulligan was a Directors Guild of America Best Director nominee.

Fear Strikes Out was nominated for the American Film Institute's 2008 list in the sports film category.

== Reception ==
In 1957, Bosley Crowther of The New York Times wrote:

Oddly enough, the scenes of baseball, while interesting in this account, are secondary to the scenes of drama between the father and his son. The issues are not whether Piersall will snag those long flies or clout home runs but whether he will have the approval of his old man, sitting there in the stands. The weight of the paternal ambition is the critical factor in this film. And it is felt by the nerve-racked observer to the point where it is recognizable that the young man must go mad. ... Fortunately, Mr. Perkins plays the young fellow excellently, not only conveying the gathering torment but also actually looking like a ballplayer on the field. And Karl Malden is compelling as the father, combining the ignorant dominance of a bitter man with the occasional tenderness of a parent who genuinely loves his only son. ...Robert Mulligan's direction is vigorous..."

Dr. Sharon Packer wrote in 2012 that Fear Strikes Out is very unusual in cinematic history in that it portrays electroconvulsive therapy in a positive light.

On the review aggregator website Rotten Tomatoes, 83% of 24 critics' reviews are positive. The website's consensus reads: "Based on the true story of troubled baseball star Jimmy Piersall, Fear Strikes Out is an emotionally compelling drama featuring excellent performances from Anthony Perkins and Karl Malden."

== See also ==
- List of baseball films
