= Any Wednesday (film) =

1966 film by Robert Ellis Miller

- Film poster by Robert McGinnis
- Directed by: Robert Ellis Miller
- Screenplay by: Julius J. Epstein
- Based on: Any Wednesday; 1964 play by Muriel Resnik
- Produced by: Julius J. Epstein
- Starring: Jane Fonda; Jason Robards; Dean Jones; Rosemary Murphy; Ann Prentiss; Jack Fletcher
- Cinematography: Harold Lipstein
- Edited by: Stefan Arnsten
- Music by: George Duning
- Distributed by: Warner Bros. Pictures
- Release date: October 13, 1966 (Radio City Music Hall)
- Running time: 109 minutes
- Country: United States
- Language: English
- Box office: $1,500,000 (US/ Canada)

Any Wednesday is a 1966 American Technicolor romantic comedy film starring Jane Fonda, Jason Robards, and Dean Jones. It was directed by Robert Ellis Miller from a screenplay by producer Julius J. Epstein based on the play of the same name by Muriel Resnik, which ran on Broadway for 983 performances from 1964 to 1966. The film was titled Bachelor Girl Apartment in the UK.

The story centers on a Manhattan woman who is trying to decide between two suitors, one married and one not, on the day of her 30th birthday.

== Plot ==
John Cleves is a businessman with an office in New York and a home in New Jersey. On one day of each week, Wednesday, he spends the night in the city, lying to wife Dorothy that he is out of town on business when he actually is seeing Ellen, his mistress.

A business client from Akron, Ohio, Cass Henderson, comes to town and is unable to find a hotel room for the night. Cleves' new secretary knows of an "executive suite" the boss maintains in town, so Cass is sent there for the night. When he meets Ellen, he mistakenly assumes she is a certain kind of lady hired by Cleves to entertain him.

The secretary compounds the error by telling Dorothy about the apartment. Dorothy goes there and discovers Ellen and Cass, assuming them to be a young couple. The women take a liking to each other so Dorothy invites them to spend an evening out on the town with her and John.

Dorothy eventually catches on to what her husband is up to and leaves him. Ellen invites her to use the apartment. John goes there and tries to win his wife's love back, but she just tells her husband to come visit her on any Wednesday.

== Cast ==
- Jane Fonda as Ellen Gordon
- Jason Robards as John Cleves
- Dean Jones as Cass Henderson
- Rosemary Murphy as Dorothy Cleves, reprising her role from the Broadway production.
- Ann Prentiss as Miss Linsley
- Jack Fletcher as Felix
- King Moody as milkman
- Kelly Jean Peters as girl in museum
- Monty Margetts as nurse

== Production ==
Exterior location scenes for Any Wednesday were filmed in Manhattan, New York City.

During the course of the 28-month run of the play Any Wednesday on Broadway, the role of Ellen was played by Sandy Dennis – who won a Tony Award for her performance – and Barbara Cook. Don Porter and Gene Hackman also appeared in it.

== Critical reception ==
Richard F. Shepard of The New York Times was fairly positive, writing that the story had made the transition from stage to screen "not much the worse for wear," though he felt "it might have been better if it were shorter. The funny lines, and there are a good number, would have been even sharper."

Variety called it "an outstanding sophisticated comedy" with "solid direction and excellent performances."

Philip K. Scheuer of the Los Angeles Times wrote, "Neither Jason Robards nor Jane Fonda strikes me particularly as a 'natural' comedian (whatever that may be) and the timing of both seems off ... In the case of Robards, a superior actor whenever he is permitted to be, I must admit to some surprise that he was willing to waste his time and talents on such a contrived and cinematically weak affair as this."

Richard L. Coe of The Washington Post called Fonda "miscast" because she "is simply not the sort of girl who doesn't know what she is doing." He thought Rosemary Murphy stole the film with an "immensely amusing" performance.

The Monthly Film Bulletin wrote, "A moderately entertaining film version of a Broadway stage production; but it could have been much more so if director Robert Ellis Miller had a lighter touch."

== Awards and honors ==
Jane Fonda was nominated for a 1966 Golden Globe Award in the category "Best Performance by an Actress in a Motion Picture - Musical or Comedy".

== Home media ==
On August 18, 2009, Warner Home Video released the movie on DVD-R as part of the Warner Archive Collection.

== See also ==
- List of American films of 1966
