= Up the Down Staircase (film) =

1967 film by Robert Mulligan

- Theatrical release poster
- Directed by: Robert Mulligan
- Screenplay by: Tad Mosel
- Based on: Up the Down Staircase; 1965 novel by Bel Kaufman
- Produced by: Alan J. Pakula
- Starring: Sandy Dennis; Patrick Bedford; Eileen Heckart; Jean Stapleton
- Cinematography: Joseph F. Coffey
- Edited by: Folmar Blangsted
- Music by: Fred Karlin
- Distributed by: Warner Bros. Pictures
- Release date: June 28, 1967
- Running time: 124 minutes
- Country: United States
- Language: English
- Box office: $5,000,000 (US/ Canada)

Up the Down Staircase is a 1967 American drama film directed by Robert Mulligan and starring Oscar winners Sandy Dennis and Eileen Heckart, along with Patrick Bedford and Jean Stapleton. The plot concerns the first, trying assignment for a young, idealistic teacher. Tad Mosel wrote the screenplay adaptation of the novel of the same name by Bel Kaufman. This was one of two last films, along with The Family Way, released by Warner Bros. Pictures, Inc. before a merger that led to Warner Bros.-Seven Arts branding in July 1967.

== Plot ==
Sylvia Barrett, fresh out of graduate school, arrives at Calvin Coolidge High School, having just been hired to teach English. On her first day, she finds her classroom has a broken glass window and two broken chairs. When her class arrives, the room becomes crowded with students who are disruptive and undisciplined. One student, Alice Blake, has a crush on English teacher Paul Barringer, but has been assigned to Sylvia's class. Another student, Joe Farone, is an intelligent but delinquent student on court-mandated probation.

As the school year progresses, Sylvia's students remain inattentive to the classroom lesson. After class, she converses with Barringer. Mr. McHabe, the school vice-principal, calls Sylvia into his office as Joe has skipped class and she has not filed her daily attendance records and burdensome paperwork. A female student, Linda, arrives late for one class, having been physically abused by her father. Concerned, Sylvia goes to Ella Friedenberg, the school's guidance counselor, to learn the PRCs (permanent record cards) of several of her students. She keeps Joe after class to discuss his record, but he walks out. They meet again on the staircase and Sylvia reports him for carrying a switch knife.

Afterwards, Barringer disagrees with Sylvia's calm, quiet teaching approach while Beatrice Schachter, an older schoolteacher, takes Sylvia under her wing. At a school dance, Barringer asks to dance with Sylvia, but she declines. Instead, he dances with Alice, who has taken kindly to Sylvia. Later on, Alice hands Barringer a love letter she has written for him, but he callously corrects the grammar and spelling, which upsets her. As Sylvia teaches Charles Dickens's A Tale of Two Cities in a lively discussion, Alice (who has skipped class) throws herself out of a school window but a ledge breaks her fall.

Sylvia learns of Alice's suicide attempt after class and blames herself. Shortly after, Principal Bester reinstates Joe back into Sylvia's class. Eddie Williams, a Black student of Sylvia's, decides to drop out of school as he believes his education will not earn him a job. The next day, as Sylvia continues the lesson on Dickens's novel, Barringer walks in during Sylvia's class and rants before the students.

During the midterms, Joe earns a high grade on his paper, which reaffirms Sylvia's interest in him. Late one night, Sylvia holds a parent-teacher conference, where she converses with a few parents of her underachieving students. When Sylvia finishes, Joe unexpectedly arrives and tries to seduce her, but she refuses. The next day, Sylvia tells the principal of her intent to resign. Bester accepts her resignation and asks her to fill out the proper paperwork.

When it is wintertime, Sylvia holds a mock trial with her students. Jose Rodriguez, a shy and modest student of Sylvia's, arrives and acts as a court judge, handling himself with a newfound self-assurance. When the class is dismissed, Jose tells Sylvia that her English class is the best he has attended. Realizing that her efforts have not been in vain, Sylvia decides to remain at Calvin Coolidge High.

== Cast ==
- Sandy Dennis as Sylvia Barrett, English teacher
- Patrick Bedford as Paul Barringer, English teacher and unpublished writer
- Eileen Heckart as Henrietta Pastorfield, English teacher
- Ruth White as Beatrice Schachter, teacher and soon Miss Barrett's mentor
- Jean Stapleton as Sadie Finch, school office staff
- Sorrell Booke as Dr. Bester, school principal
- Roy Poole as Mr McHabe, school vice-principal
- Florence Stanley as Ella Friedenberg, guidance counselor
- Vinnette Carroll as The Mother; student Roy Atkins' guardian, Mrs. Lewes
- Frances Sternhagen as Charlotte Wolf, school librarian
- Jeff Howard as Joe Ferone, student

== Production ==
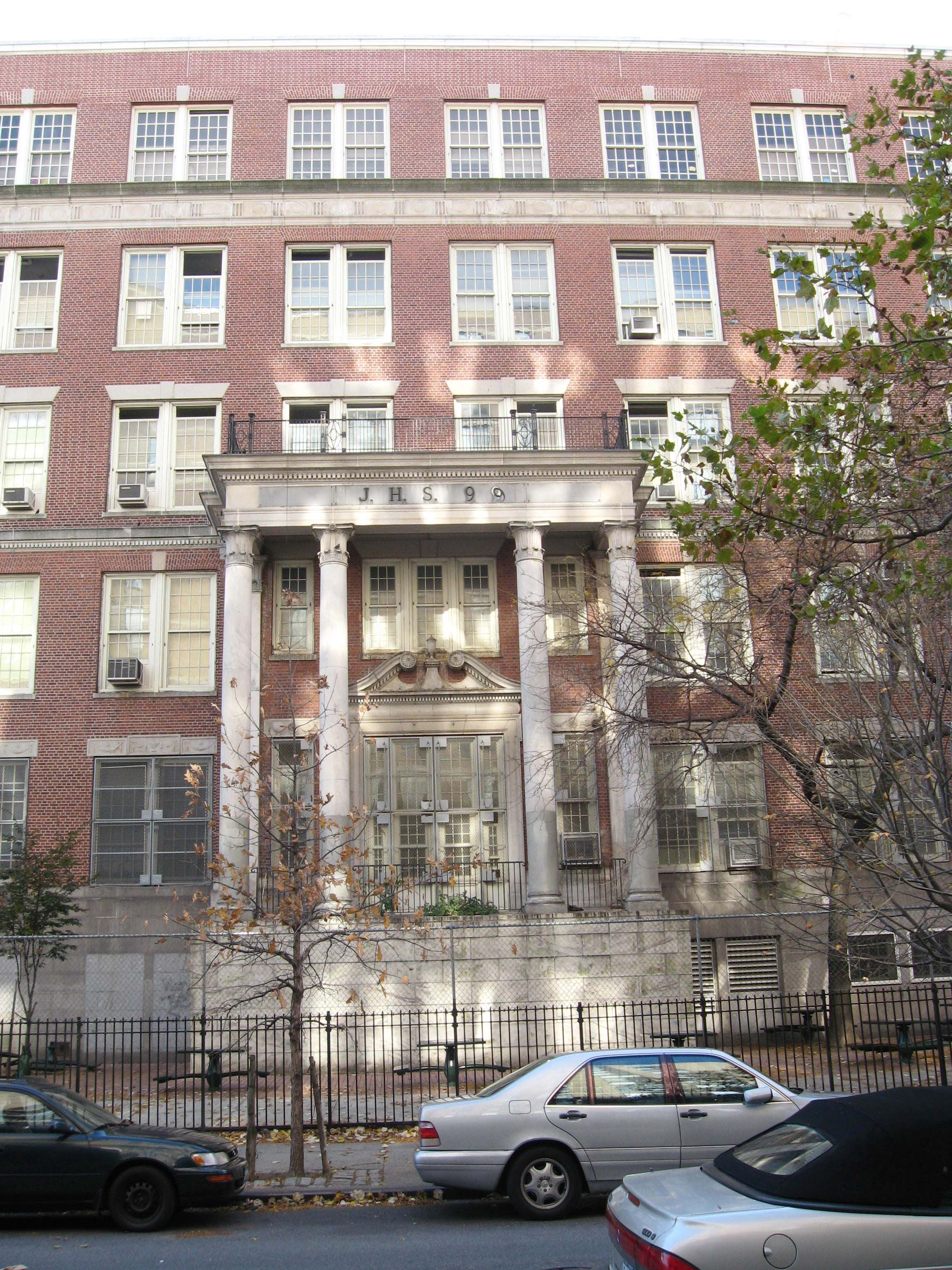
Julia de Burgos Junior High in East Harlem (now Renaissance Charter High School for Innovation) provided the exterior of Calvin Coolidge High School.

Sandy Dennis took the role of Sylvia Barrett after winning an Academy Award for Best Supporting Actress for her performance in Who's Afraid of Virginia Woolf?

The film was entered into the 5th Moscow International Film Festival, at which Dennis won the award for Best Actress.

Outdoor street scenes were filmed on 1st Ave. and East 100th Street in East Harlem. The outdoor school scenes were filmed on the same block at Julia de Burgos Junior High School 99 at 410 East 100th St. (now the Renaissance Charter High School for Innovation). Some indoor school and classroom scenes were filmed at the former Haaren High School on 59th St. and 10th Ave. (today's John Jay College of Criminal Justice) and at a production studio in Chelsea.

Filming took place during the summer of 1966 during a record-breaking heat wave in New York City. Outdoor scenes depicting snowstorms were actually filmed while the temperature was as high as 95 °F.

The actors portraying the students were non-professionals, and most were high-school students themselves. Jeff Howard, 20 years old, was a Long Island University student. Jose Rodriguez, the quiet student who blossoms during the trial sequence, was a 17-year-old student at the New York School of Printing, now the High School of Graphic Communication Arts. Ellen O'Mara, who plays a lovestruck student, was also 17 and attended Washington Irving High School (now known as the Washington Irving Campus). Salvatore Rasa, playing the student-body president of the fictional high school, was 17 and had that role in real life at Bishop Ford High School.

== Reception ==
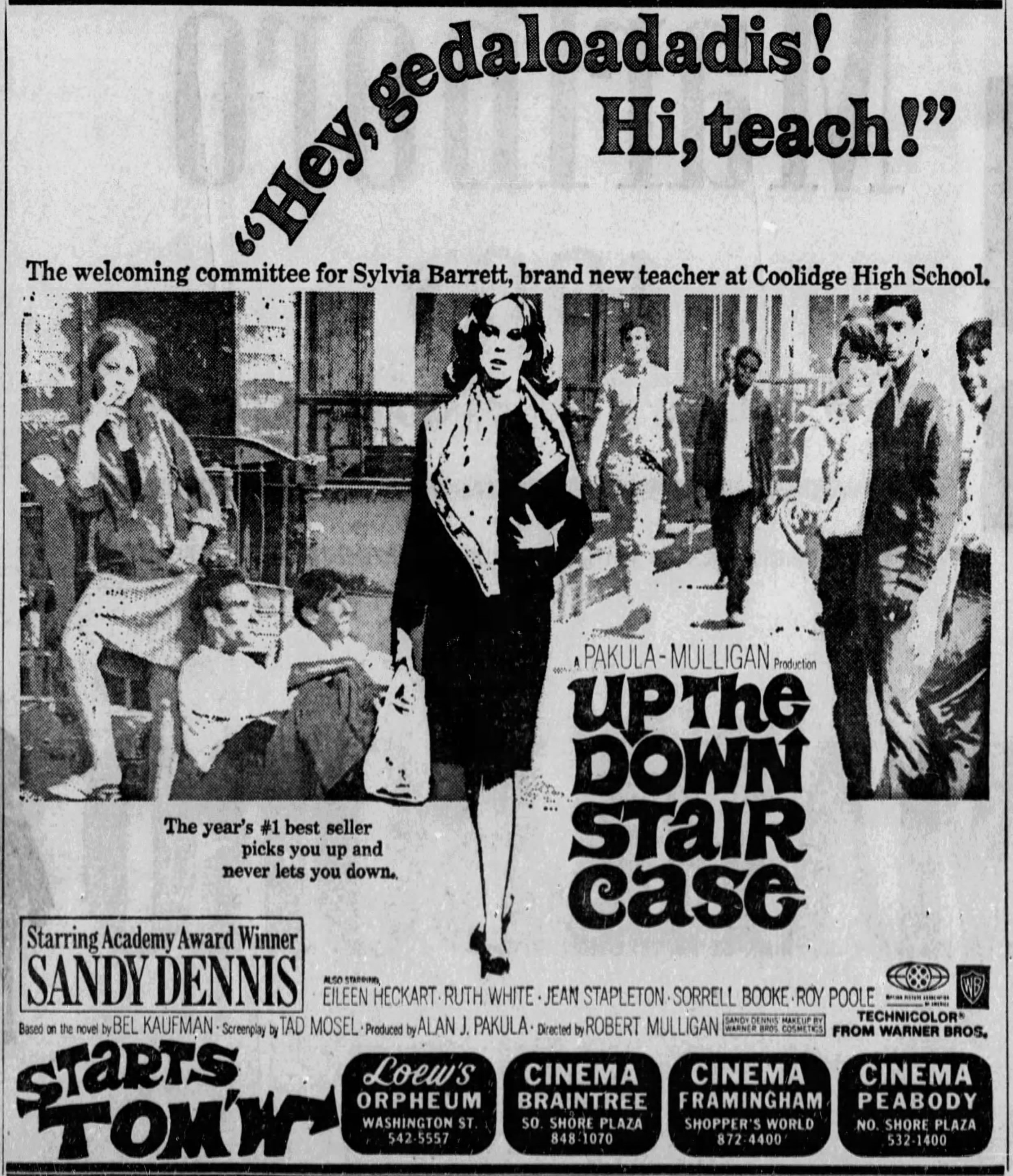
Theatrical advertisement from 1967

In a contemporary review, New York Times critic Bosley Crowther wrote: "For the most part, this is a beautifully balanced, fluid film, with engrossing contemporary material and excellent performances." He praised Dennis's performance, writing that she "... walks away with the show, giving a vivid performance of emotional range and depth. Her beaming enthusiasms, her startled hesitations, her grave alarms, her humors and indignations and her air of intense sincerity acquaint us with a genuine, loving person we can believe wants to find her pupils' wounds and, what's more, try to heal them – which she can't, and that's the sadness of it all."

Los Angeles Times critic Charles Champlin called the film a "very, very, very good movie" and wrote: "It is at once warm and chilling, tough and sentimental, greatly moving, notably honest, improvisationally fresh, wryly and ribaldly funny, disturbing yet infused with a quantity of optimism no larger than the human heart. It is a work of fiction with the feeling of a documentary, in the best sense of giving us real insights into ourselves and others."

Champlin and others noted the striking similarities between Up the Down Staircase and To Sir, with Love, films released within one month of each other. He wrote: "The accents are different, but, obviously, antiquated school buildings, inadequate budgets and despairing faculty are ironic common bonds with our ally across the Atlantic. The problems and resolutions are remarkably similar on both sides of the ocean, bespeaking nothing more and nothing less than the universality of the problems. ... What finally unifies them is their joint indictment of pedagogic attitudes which push methods and merchandise so unrelated to students' real interests and needs as to spark only rebellion or apathy."

On the review aggregator website Rotten Tomatoes, 78% of 41 critics' reviews are positive, with an average rating of 7.6/10. The website's consensus reads: "While it occasionally approaches its source material from the wrong direction, Up the Down Staircase remains a worthy story that benefits from Sandy Dennis' strong performance."

== See also ==
- List of teachers portrayed in films
- List of hood films
