= Any Wednesday (play) =

1964 American stage play

- Original language: English
- Written by: Muriel Resnik
- Genre: sex comedy
- Setting: A garden apartment in the East Sixties, Manhattan. July.

Premiere
- Date: February 18, 1964
- Place: Music Box Theatre, New York City
- Directed by: Henry Kaplan

Any Wednesday is a 1964 American stage play by Muriel Resnik. It ran for 983 performances from 1964 to 1966, making it one of the most successful comedies on Broadway in the 1960s, and was turned into a feature film of the same name in 1966.

The play's star, Sandy Dennis, won a Tony Award for her performance; William Goldman called it "one of the personal triumphs of the decade." It was also an early success in the career of Gene Hackman.

The show had a tortured history. The script began as a short piece for the Actors Studio to use as a rehearsal scene before being expanded. It went through four different directors, and star Michael Rennie left the cast, being replaced at short notice by Don Porter.

Amanda Barrie played the lead role in the London production which was less successful.

== Opening Night Cast ==
- Sandy Dennis as Ellen Gordon
- Don Porter as John Cleves
- Gene Hackman as Cass Henderson
- Rosemary Murphy as Dorothy Cleves

== Reception ==
Variety said "Long-shot winners are always exciting, and last week’s surprise kick opening of Any Wednesday was no exception. The advance dope was that the Muriel Resnik comedy was a foregone clinker. It turned out to be a sleeper however, with an added kick in the emergence of a new star in a previously little-known actress, Sandy Dennis... Any Wednesday is a plausible, adroitly wacky and not only consistently funny but also infectiously warm and enjoyable romantic comedy."

William Goldman later analysed the play's success in his book The Season, calling it an example of "Popular Theatre", which he defined as plays that "tell us either a truth that we already know or a falsehood we want to believe in." Goldman attributed the popularity of the play to the casting of Sandy Dennis in the lead, arguing:

Any Wednesday has a premise that might prove touching: a mistress turning thirty... A mistress on such a day might logically have cause for reflection and just as logically not like the picture she sees. And if she becomes unhappy, which she assuredly must, so will we. But Any Wednesday is Popular Theatre. Love will find a way, and so they didn’t cast someone turning thirty; they cast Sandy Dennis, who was probably around twenty-seven, but who looked twenty-two and acted eighteen. She said she was turning thirty, but we never had to face the reality of believing her, so the pain of the play was, happily, not there for us.

== Awards and nominations ==
=== Original Broadway production ===
Year	Award	Category	Nominee	Result
1964	Tony Award	Best Actress in a Play	Sandy Dennis	Won
1964	Tony Award	Best Featured Actress in a Play	Rosemary Murphy	Nominated
1964	Theatre World Award		Sandra Smith	Honoree
