= Sandy Dennis =

American actress (1937–1992)

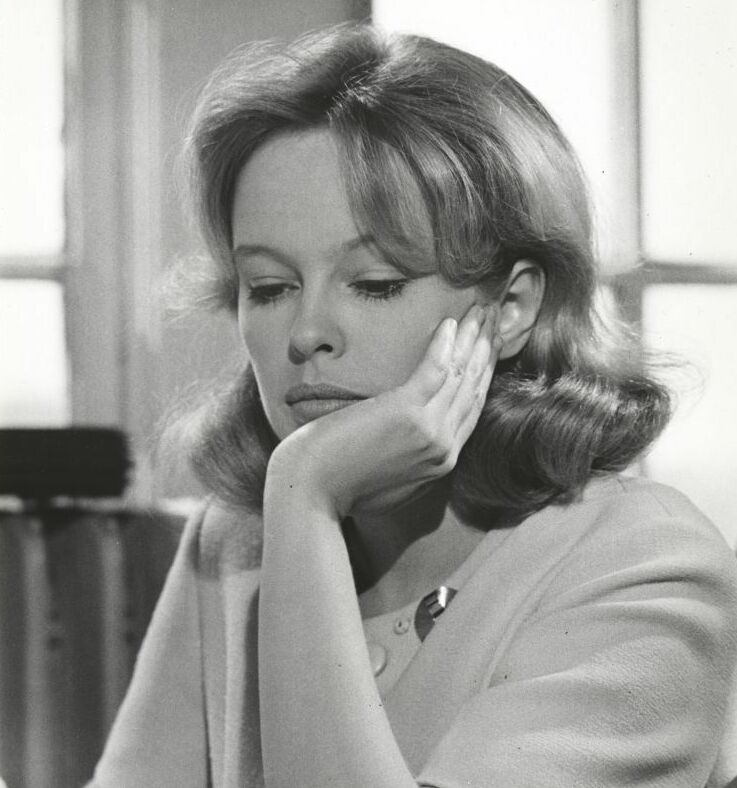
- Dennis in 1967
- Born: Sandra Dale Dennis; April 27, 1937; Hastings, Nebraska, U.S.
- Died: March 2, 1992 (aged 54); Westport, Connecticut, U.S.
- Occupation: Actress
- Years active: 1956–1991
- Partners: Gerry Mulligan (1965–1974); Eric Roberts (1980–1985)

Sandra Dale Dennis (April 27, 1937 – March 2, 1992) was an American actress. She made her film debut in the drama Splendor in the Grass (1961). For her performance in the comedy-drama film Who's Afraid of Virginia Woolf? (1966), she received the Academy Award for Best Supporting Actress.

Dennis appeared in the films Up the Down Staircase (1967), The Fox (1967), Sweet November (1968), That Cold Day in the Park (1969), The Out-of-Towners (1970), God Told Me To (1976), The Four Seasons (1981), Come Back to the Five and Dime, Jimmy Dean, Jimmy Dean (1982), and Another Woman (1988). Her final film appearance came in the crime drama film The Indian Runner (1991).

In a successful career on stage, Dennis appeared in the original stage production of Come Back to the 5 & Dime, Jimmy Dean, Jimmy Dean. For her performance in the play A Thousand Clowns, she received the Tony Award for Best Featured Actress in a Play. For her performance in the play Any Wednesday, she received the Tony Award for Best Actress in a Play.

Dennis was devoted to the cause of animal welfare. She rescued stray cats from Grand Central Terminal. At the time of her death in Westport, Connecticut, she lived with more than 20 cats, who were adopted out by longtime friends to new homes.

== Early life ==
Dennis was born in Hastings, Nebraska, the daughter of Yvonne (née Hudson), a secretary, and Jack Dennis, a postal clerk. Her parents divorced in 1966 after 38 years of marriage. She had one brother, Frank, who was eight years older. Dennis grew up in Kenesaw, Nebraska, and Lincoln, Nebraska, graduating from Lincoln High School in 1955; one of her classmates was writer and comedian Dick Cavett. She attended Nebraska Wesleyan University and the University of Nebraska, appearing in the Lincoln Community Theater Group before moving to New York City at age 19. She studied acting at HB Studio in New York City.

== Career ==
=== Early career ===
Dennis made her television debut in 1956 in the soap opera Guiding Light.

She had an early break when cast as an understudy in the Broadway production of William Inge's The Dark at the Top of the Stairs (1957) directed by Elia Kazan. Kazan cast Dennis in her first feature film, a small part in Splendor in the Grass (1961), which starred Natalie Wood and Warren Beatty.

Dennis was cast in Face of a Hero (1960) on Broadway alongside Jack Lemmon. The play had only a short run, but Dennis received good notices. The Complaisant Lover (1961–62) by Graham Greene was more successful, running for 101 performances; Michael Redgrave and Googie Withers were also in the cast.

=== Broadway stardom ===
Dennis achieved Broadway fame with her leading role in Herb Gardner's A Thousand Clowns (1962–63), for which she won a Tony award for her performance. She was replaced in the 1965 film version by Barbara Harris. The show ran for 428 performances.

Around this time, Dennis guest-starred on episodes of the TV series Naked City ("Idylls of a Running Back", 1962, "Carrier", 1963), The Fugitive ("The Other Side of the Mountain", 1963), Arrest and Trial ("Somewhat Lower Than the Angels" 1964), and Mr. Broadway ("Don't Mention My Name in Sheboygan", 1964). She was the lead of the Broadway comedy Any Wednesday (1964–66), which ran for 983 performances and won her a second Tony.

=== Film stardom ===
Dennis' second film role was as Honey, the fragile, neurotic young wife of George Segal's character, in Who's Afraid of Virginia Woolf? (1966). Directed by Mike Nichols and starring Elizabeth Taylor and Richard Burton, the film was a huge critical and commercial success and Dennis won the Oscar for Best Supporting Actress for her role.

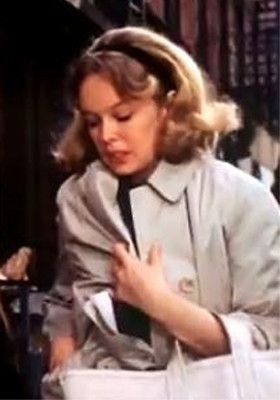
Dennis in Up the Down Staircase (1967)

Dennis returned to the stage in a production of The Three Sisters (1966) with Geraldine Page and Kim Stanley that went to London and was filmed.

Dennis' first lead role in a movie was in Up the Down Staircase (1967), directed by Robert Mulligan. In his review for The New York Times, Bosley Crowther cited her for "a vivid performance of emotional range and depth … engagingly natural, sensitive, literate and thoroughly moving." The film was a box-office success, as was The Fox (1967), directed by Mark Rydell, despite its controversial subject matter. In 1967 Dennis was voted the 18th biggest star in the US.

Dennis briefly returned to Broadway to star in Daphne in Cottage D (1967), which had a short run.

She starred in Sweet November (1968) as a woman who takes multiple lovers, and made a TV version of the play A Hatful of Rain (1968).

Dennis went to London to star in A Touch of Love (1969), alternately titled Thank You All Very Much in the USA, which flopped at the box office. That Cold Day in the Park (1969), by Robert Altman, did not fare much better. The Out-of-Towners (1970), a Neil Simon comedy with Jack Lemmon, was a hit.

=== Television and supporting roles ===
Dennis made a TV movie with Stuart Whitman, Only Way Out Is Dead (1970). She returned to Broadway for How the Other Half Loves (1971) by Alan Ayckbourn, which ran for over 100 performances, then did another TV movie Something Evil (1972), directed by Steven Spielberg, which drew a mixed reception.

Let Me Hear You Smile (1973) on Broadway only lasted one performance, but Absurd Person Singular (1974–76) was a big hit, running 591 performances.

In 1974 she played Joan of Arc in the pilot of Witness to Yesterday, Patrick Watson's series of interviews with great figures out of the past.

Dennis was in Mr. Sycamore (1975) with Jason Robards and had a small role in the low-budget horror film God Told Me To (1976) by Larry Cohen. Her performance in the British comedy Nasty Habits (1977) drew harsh criticism from Vincent Canby in the New York Times.

Dennis guest starred in Police Story ("Day of Terror... Night of Fear", 1978), and starred in the TV movies Perfect Gentlemen (1979) (written by Nora Ephron), and Wilson's Reward (1981). On Broadway she briefly joined the cast of the long-running Same Time, Next Year.

She had a well-received part in Alan Alda's The Four Seasons (1981) and was in The Supporting Cast (1981) on Broadway for Gene Saks. She was in the stage production and film version of Robert Altman's Come Back to the Five and Dime, Jimmy Dean, Jimmy Dean (1982).

=== Later career ===
In the mid- and late 1980s, Dennis acted less, owing to growing health problems. She appeared on TV in Young People's Specials ("The Trouble with Mother", 1985), The Love Boat ("Roommates/Heartbreaker/Out of the Blue", 1985), Alfred Hitchcock Presents ("Arthur, or the Gigolo", 1985) and The Equalizer ("Out of the Past", 1986). In motion pictures, she had supporting roles in a 1986 remake of Laughter in the Dark, which was never completed, Woody Allen's Another Woman (1988), and the horror films 976-EVIL (1989) and Parents (1989).

Her final role was in the crime drama The Indian Runner, filmed in 1990 and released in 1991. The movie marked Sean Penn's debut as a film director. Actor Viggo Mortensen, who played one of her two sons, wrote of the preparations for the movie and filming in the vicinity of Omaha, Nebraska:

When I first met with Sean Penn and his producer, Don Phillips, to discuss the possibility of my playing Frank, one of the first questions I asked them was who, if anyone, they had in mind to play the mother. When Sean answered that he did not want to consider anyone other than Sandy Dennis for the part, I couldn't have been happier, or more in agreement. Aside from my feelings for her as a friend, I believed she would be a great asset to the movie and would inspire us all to do our best. This proved to be true. As it turned out, most of her work was cut from the movie. This was not due to any shortcoming on her part. On the contrary, she was brilliant throughout … She was working on a level far above the rest of us. The concentration and vulnerability that she invested in the scene were remarkable. Heart-breaking. The fact that most of us knew that she was dying of ovarian cancer as she showed us the emotional disintegration of the character made the experience all the more poignant.

== Personal life ==
Dennis lived with prominent jazz musician Gerry Mulligan from 1965 to 1974. In October 1965, her hometown newspaper, The Lincoln Star, published an Associated Press article stating she and Mulligan had married in Connecticut in June of that year. In a 1989 interview with People, however, Dennis admitted that they only pretended to be married after she unintentionally became pregnant. Dennis miscarried, adding, "If I'd been a mother, I would have loved the child, but I just didn't have any connection with it when I was pregnant ... I never, ever wanted children. It would have been like having an elephant."

From 1980 to 1985, Dennis lived with actor Eric Roberts, 19 years her junior. On June 4, 1981, her German Shepherd was riding with Roberts when he crashed his vehicle into a tree. Roberts, who was under the influence of cocaine at the time, was in a coma for 72 hours and had to withdraw from the Broadway show Mass Appeal. Dennis' dog survived the accident. She and Roberts were engaged to be married in spring 1983, but the ceremony never took place. In his 2024 autobiography Runaway Train, Roberts wrote that he too had impregnated Dennis, but she got an abortion.

Dennis' sexual orientation was a matter of public discussion as early as 1968, when the scandal magazine Uncensored ran a story that labeled her a lesbian. In an article published less than four years after Dennis' death, Eric Roberts identified her as bisexual. According to Roberts, Dennis told him she had many lesbian relationships and that she "appreciated the beauty of women. But she also liked and appreciated what a very, very young man could do to a woman, I suppose."

During Dennis' lifetime, in-depth published interviews with her, such as one with The Christian Science Monitor during her stint performing in an ensemble cast at the John F. Kennedy Center for the Performing Arts in 1981, made no mention of close relationships with women. That interview included the following exchange between journalist Louise Sweeney and Dennis about her marital status:

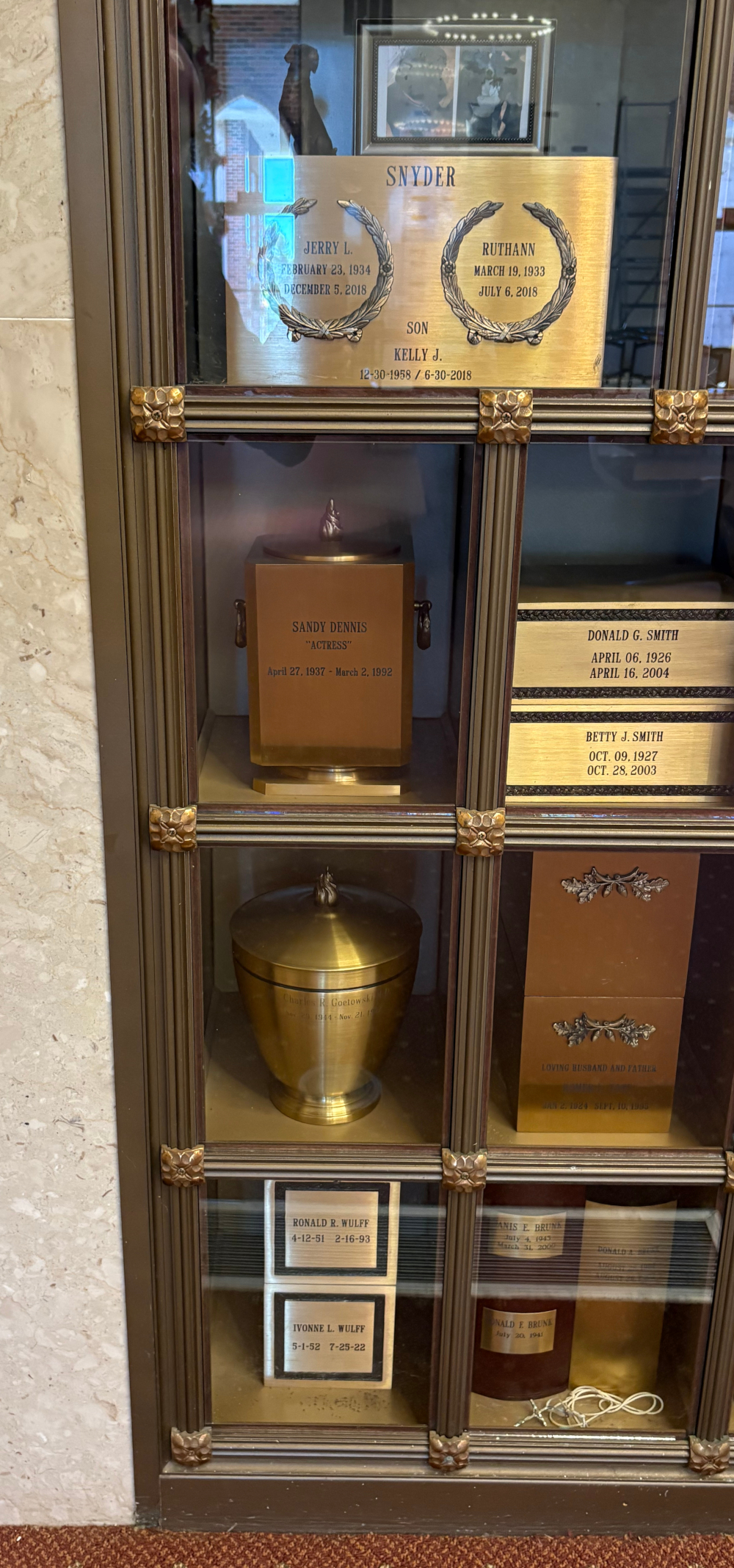
Dennis' niche at Lincoln Memorial Park

At one point I say, "When you were married to Gerry Mulligan ..." but she breaks in, tersely: "I was never married to anybody." I point out that "Who's Who" says she was married to Mulligan.

She says, "It's not—I'm not fussy about that—the truth is I was never married. We had a long association but we never married..."

But there it is in Current Biography: "In June, 1965, after a three-week courtship, Sandy Dennis was married to Gerry Mulligan, the jazz saxophonist and composer."

She sits bolt upright and repeats: "I've never been married. And I'm not fussy about it. It's just the truth is, that I was never married. It isn't true that I was ever married, which means that I never got a divorce. The newspapers jumped to that conclusion. It's so hard to get to somebody and say ... Oh, they're so funny about it."

Dennis also dated actor Gerald S. O'Loughlin.

== Death ==
Dennis died from ovarian cancer on March 2, 1992, at her home in Westport, Connecticut, at age 54. She was cremated and interred at Lincoln Memorial Park in Lincoln, Nebraska.

== Filmography ==
=== Film ===
Year	Title	Role	Notes
1961	Splendor in the Grass	Kay	
1966	Who's Afraid of Virginia Woolf?	"Honey"	Academy Award for Best Supporting Actress; Laurel Award for Top Female Supporting Performance; Laurel Award for Top Female New Face; Nominated—Golden Globe Award for Best Supporting Actress – Motion Picture
1966	The Three Sisters	Irina	
1967	Up the Down Staircase	Sylvia Barrett	Moscow International Film Festival Best Actress Award (tied with Grynet Molvig for A Time in the Sun)
1967	The Fox	Jill Banford	
1968	Sweet November	Sara Deever	
1969	A Touch of Love	Rosamund Stacey	
1969	That Cold Day in the Park	Frances Austen	
1970	The Out of Towners	Gwen Kellerman	Nominated—Golden Globe Award for Best Actress – Motion Picture Musical or Comedy; Nominated—Laurel Award for Top Female Comedic Performance
1975	Mr. Sycamore	Jane Gwilt	
1976	God Told Me To	Martha Nicholas	
1977	Nasty Habits	Sister Winifred	
1981	The Four Seasons	Anne Callan	
1982	Come Back to the 5 & Dime, Jimmy Dean, Jimmy Dean	Mona	
1986	Laughter in the Dark	Unknown	
1988	Another Woman	Claire	
1988	976-EVIL	Aunt Lucy Wilmoth	
1989	Parents	Millie Dew	
1991	The Indian Runner	Mrs. Roberts	Final film role

=== Television ===
Year	Title	Role	Notes
1956	Guiding Light	Alice Holden	Unknown episodes
1962	Naked City	Eleanor Ann Hubber	Episode: "Idylls of a Running Back"
1963	Naked City	Lorraine	Episode: "Carrier"
1963	The Fugitive	Cassie Bolin	Episode: "The Other Side of the Mountain"
1964	Arrest and Trial	Molly White	Episode: "Somewhat Lower Than the Angels"
1964	Mr. Broadway	Patricia Kelsey	Episode: "Don't Mention My Name in Sheboygan"
1968	A Hatful of Rain	Celia Pope	Television film
1970	Only Way Out Is Dead	Dr. Enid Bingham	aired on ABC Movie of the Week as The Man Who Wanted to Live Forever
1972	Something Evil	Marjorie Worden	Television film
1978	Police Story	Sharon Bristol	Episode: "Day of Terror... Night of Fear"
1978	Perfect Gentlemen	Sophie Rosenman	Television film
1980	Wilson's Reward	Martha James	Television film
1985	The Execution	Elsa Spahn	Television film
1985	The Love Boat	Gina Caldwell	Episode: "Roommates/Heartbreakers/Out of the Blue"
1985	Alfred Hitchcock Presents	Helen	Episode: "Arthur, or the Gigolo"
1985	Young People's Specials	Patricia Benson	Episode: "The Trouble with Mother"
1986	The Equalizer	Kay Wesley	Episode: "Out of the Past"

== Theater ==
Run	Title	Role	Notes
Dec 5, 1957 – Jan 17, 1959	The Dark at the Top of the Stairs	Reenie Flood / Flirt Conroy	Understudy
Oct 20, 1960 – Nov 19, 1960	Face of a Hero	Millicent Bishop	Theatre World Award
Nov 1, 1961 – Jan 27, 1962	The Complaisant Lover	Ann Howard	
Apr 5, 1962 – Apr 13, 1963	A Thousand Clowns	Sandra Markowitz	Tony Award for Best Featured Actress in a Play
Feb 18, 1964 – Jun 26, 1966	Any Wednesday	Ellen Gordon	Tony Award for Best Actress in a Play
Oct 15, 1967 – Nov 18, 1967	Daphne in Cottage D	Daphne	
Mar 29, 1971 – Jun 26, 1971	How the Other Half Loves	Teresa Phillips	
Jan 16, 1973	Let Me Hear You Smile	Hannah Heywood	
Oct 8, 1974 – Mar 6, 1976	Absurd Person Singular	Eva	
Mar 14, 1975 – Sep 3, 1978	Same Time, Next Year	Doris	Replacement
Aug 6, 1981 – Sep 5, 1981	The Supporting Cast	Sally	
Feb 18, 1982 – Apr 4, 1982	Come Back to the Five and Dime, Jimmy Dean, Jimmy Dean	Mona	
