= 36th Academy Awards =

- Official pamphlet cover
- Date: April 13, 1964
- Site: Santa Monica Civic Auditorium; Santa Monica, California, U.S.
- Hosted by: Jack Lemmon
- Produced by: Richard Dunlap; George Sidney
- Directed by: Richard Dunlap

Highlights
- Best Picture: Tom Jones
- Most awards: Cleopatra and Tom Jones (4)
- Most nominations: Tom Jones (10)

TV in the United States
- Network: ABC

The 36th Academy Awards, honoring the best in film for 1963, were held on April 13, 1964, hosted by Jack Lemmon at the Santa Monica Civic Auditorium in Santa Monica, California. This ceremony introduced the category for Best Sound Effects, with It's a Mad, Mad, Mad, Mad World being the first film to win the award.

Best Picture winner Tom Jones is the only film to date to receive three Best Supporting Actress nominations; it also tied the Oscar record of five unsuccessful acting nominations, set by Peyton Place at the 30th Academy Awards.

Patricia Neal won Best Actress for her role in Hud, despite having a relatively small amount of screen time. Melvyn Douglas won Best Supporting Actor for the same film, making it the second and, to date, last film to win two acting awards without being nominated for Best Picture (the other being The Miracle Worker the previous year).

At age 71, Margaret Rutherford set a then-record as the oldest winner for Best Supporting Actress, a year after Patty Duke set a then-record as the youngest winner. Rutherford was also only the second Oscar winner over the age of 70 (the other was Edmund Gwenn), as well as the last person born in the 19th century to win an acting Oscar. This was the only year in Academy history that all Best Supporting Actress nominees were born outside the United States.

Sidney Poitier became the first African American actor to win Best Actor, and was the only winner in an acting category present at the ceremony, as all the other winners were abroad. Upon receiving the wrong envelope, Sammy Davis Jr. remarked, "wait until the NAACP hears about this!"

An Occurrence at Owl Creek Bridge was the first Oscar-winning film to have aired on network television prior to the ceremony.

== Awards ==
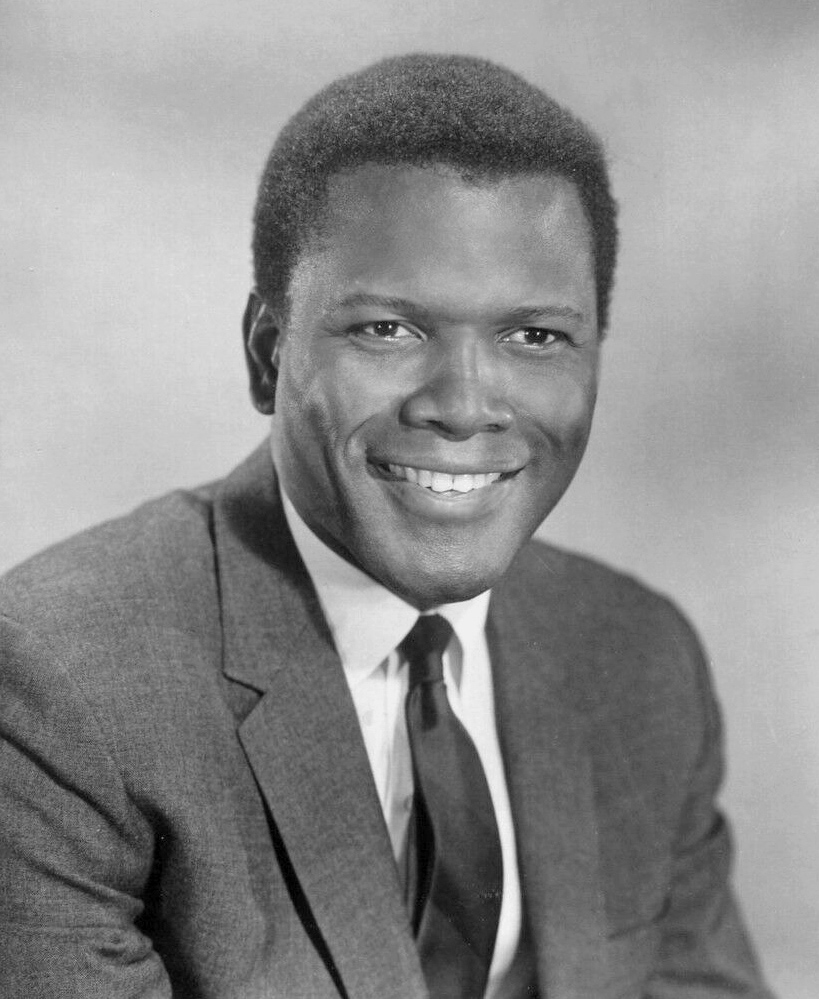
Sidney Poitier, Best Actor winner

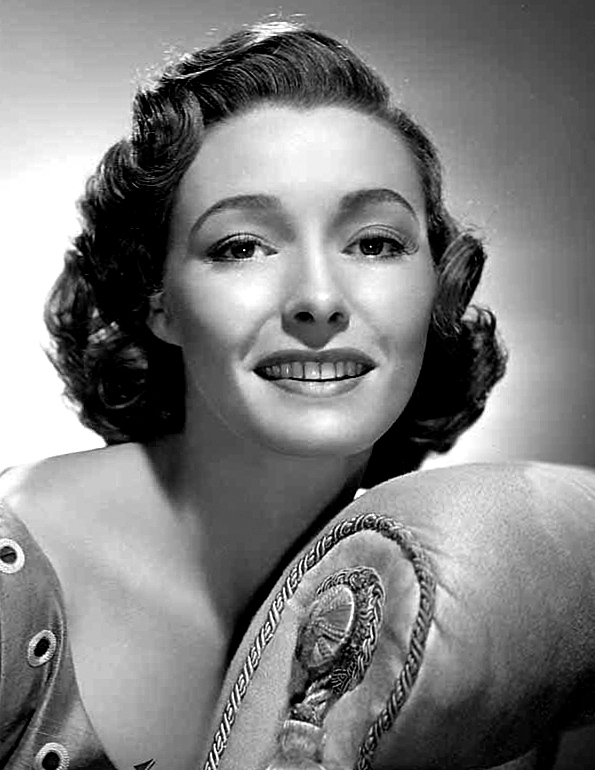
Patricia Neal, Best Actress winner

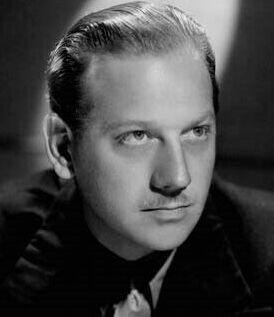
Melvyn Douglas, Best Supporting Actor winner

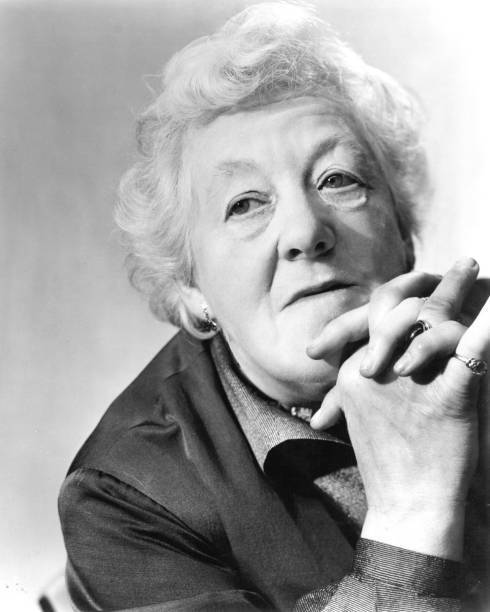
Margaret Rutherford, Best Supporting Actress winner

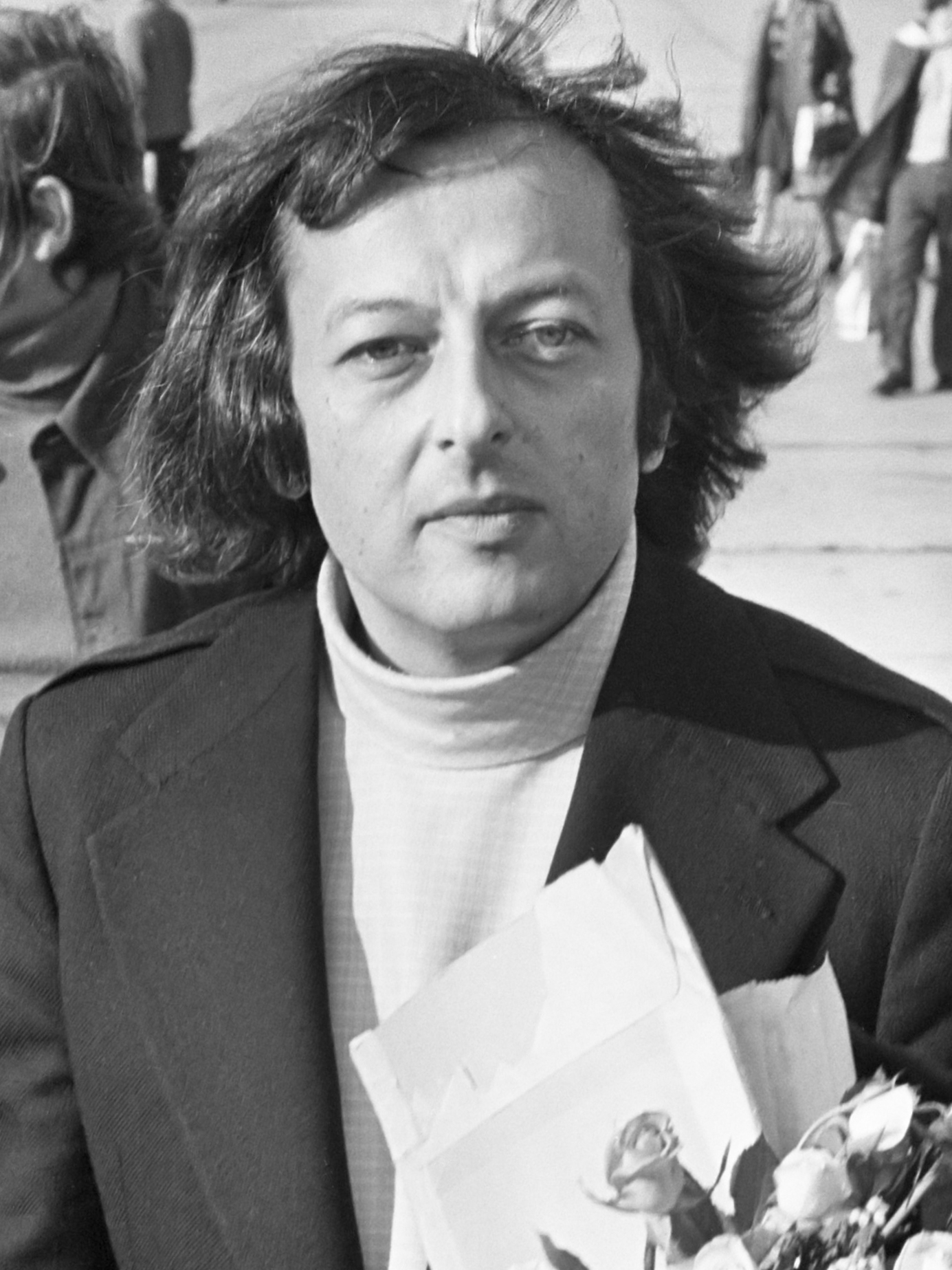
André Previn, Best Scoring of Music — Adaptation or Treatment winner

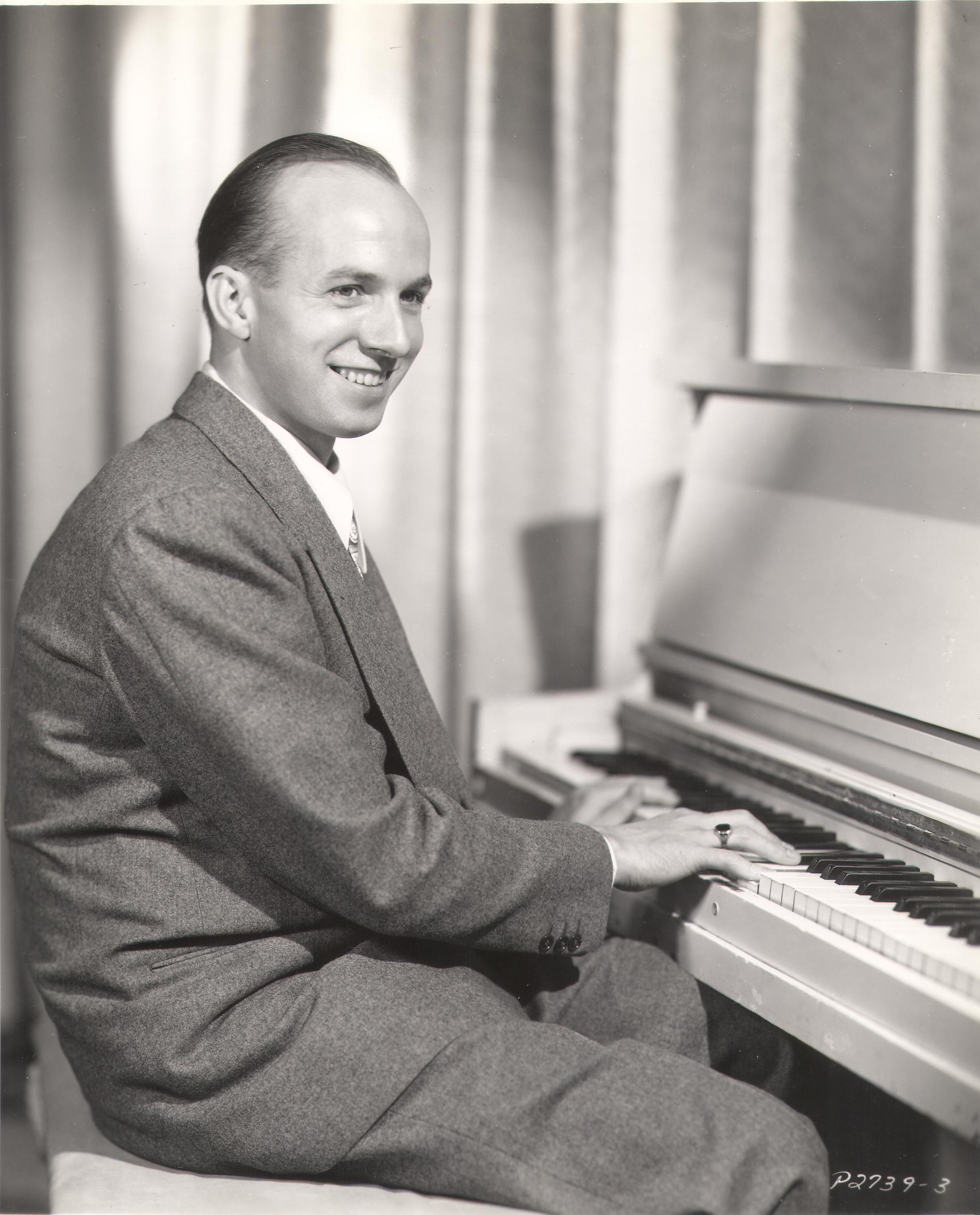
Jimmy Van Heusen, Best Song co-winner

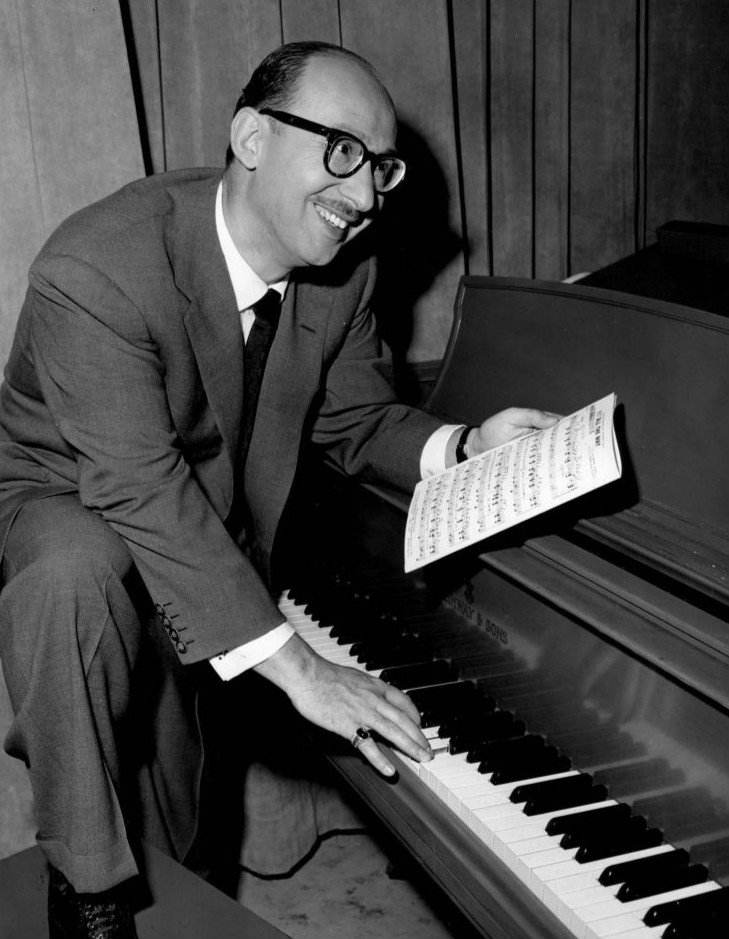
Sammy Cahn, Best Song co-winner

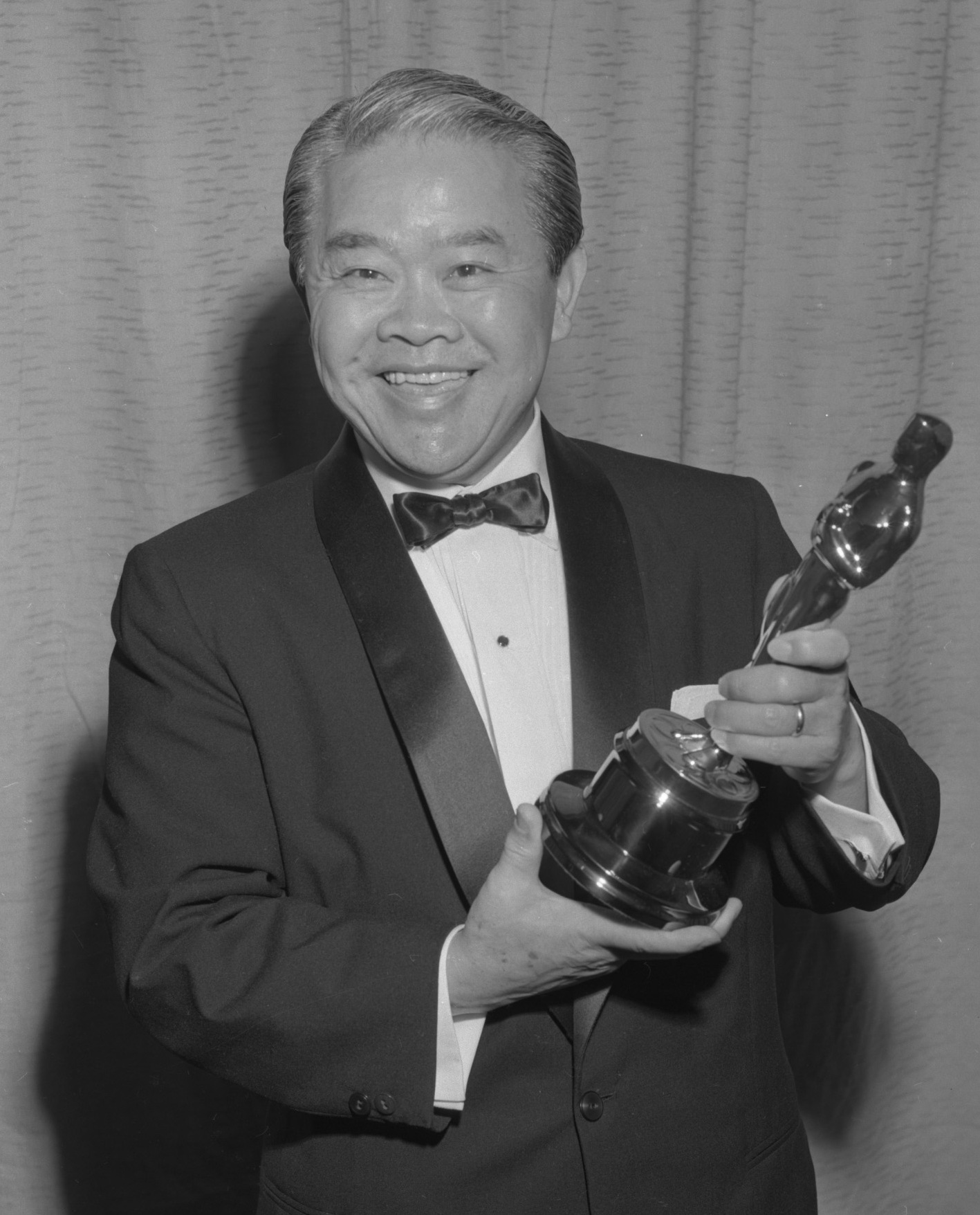
James Wong Howe, Best Cinematography, Black-and-White winner

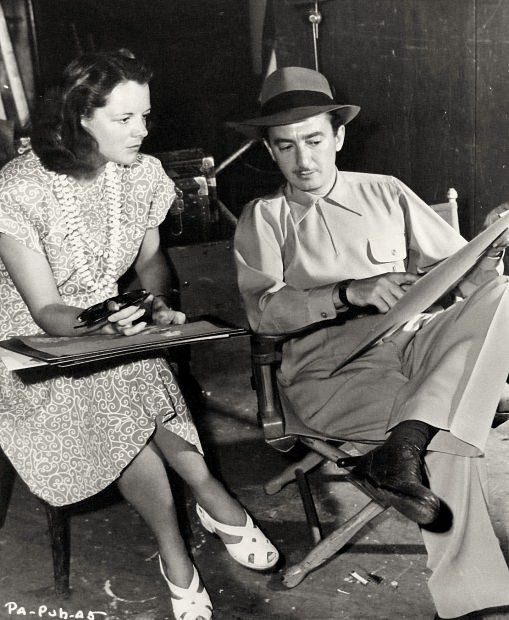
Renié (left), Best Costume Design, Color co-winner

Nominations announced on February 24, 1964. Winners are listed first and highlighted in boldface.

**Best Picture**: **Tom Jones – Tony Richardson, producer**; America America – Elia Kazan, producer; Cleopatra – Walter Wanger, producer; How the West Was Won – Bernard Smith, producer; Lilies of the Field – Ralph Nelson, producer	**Best Directing**: **Tony Richardson – Tom Jones**; Federico Fellini – 8½; Elia Kazan – America America; Otto Preminger – The Cardinal; Martin Ritt – Hud
**Best Actor**: **Sidney Poitier – Lilies of the Field as Homer Smith**; Albert Finney – Tom Jones as Tom Jones; Richard Harris – This Sporting Life as Frank Machin; Rex Harrison – Cleopatra as Julius Caesar; Paul Newman – Hud as Hud Bannon	**Best Actress**: **Patricia Neal – Hud as Alma Brown**; Leslie Caron – The L-Shaped Room as Jane Fosset; Shirley MacLaine – Irma la Douce as Irma la Douce; Rachel Roberts – This Sporting Life as Margaret Hammond; Natalie Wood – Love with the Proper Stranger as Angie Rossini
**Best Actor in a Supporting Role**: **Melvyn Douglas – Hud as Homer Bannon**; Nick Adams – Twilight of Honor as Ben Brown; Bobby Darin – Captain Newman, M.D. as Corporal Jim Tompkins, USAAF; Hugh Griffith – Tom Jones as Squire Western; John Huston – The Cardinal as Cardinal Glennon	**Best Actress in a Supporting Role**: **Margaret Rutherford – The V.I.P.s as the Duchess of Brighton**; Diane Cilento – Tom Jones as Molly Seagrim; Edith Evans – Tom Jones as Miss Western; Joyce Redman – Tom Jones as Mrs. Waters/Jenny Jones; Lilia Skala – Lilies of the Field as Mother Maria
**Best Writing (Story and Screenplay -- Written Directly for the Screen)**: **How the West Was Won – James R. Webb**; 8½ – Federico Fellini, Ennio Flaiano, Tullio Pinelli, and Brunello Rondi; America America – Elia Kazan; The Four Days of Naples – Screenplay by Carlo Bernari, Pasquale Festa Campanile, Massimo Franciosa, and Nanni Loy; Story by Pasquale Festa Campanile, Massimo Franciosa, Nanni Loy, and Vasco Pratolini; Love with the Proper Stranger – Arnold Schulman	**Best Writing (Screenplay -- Based on Material from Another Medium)**: **Tom Jones – John Osborne based on the novel The History of Tom Jones, a Foundling by Henry Fielding**; Captain Newman, M.D. – Richard L. Breen, Phoebe Ephron, and Henry Ephron based on the novel by Leo Rosten; Hud – Irving Ravetch and Harriet Frank Jr. based on the novel Horseman, Pass By by Larry McMurtry; Lilies of the Field – James Poe based on the novel by William E. Barrett; Sundays and Cybele – Antoine Tudal and Serge Bourguignon based on the novel Les Dimanches de Ville d'Avray by Bernard Eschassériaux
**Best Foreign Language Film**: **8½ (Italy)**; Knife in the Water (Poland); The Red Lanterns (Greece); Los Tarantos (Spain); Twin Sisters of Kyoto (Japan)	**Best Documentary (Feature)**: **Robert Frost: A Lover's Quarrel with the World – Robert Hughes**; Le Maillon et la Chaine – Paul de Roubaix; The Yanks Are Coming – Marshall Flaum; ~~Terminus – Edgar Anstey~~ (nomination revoked)
**Best Documentary (Short Subject)**: **Chagall – Simon Schiffrin**; The Five Cities of June – George Stevens Jr.; The Spirit of America – Algernon G. Walker; Thirty Million Letters – Edgar Anstey; To Live Again – Mel London	**Best Short Subject (Live Action)**: **An Occurrence at Owl Creek Bridge – Paul de Roubaix and Marcel Ichac**; The Concert – Ezra Baker; The Home-Made Car – James Hill; The Six-Sided Triangle – Christopher Miles; That's Me – Walker Stuart
**Best Short Subject (Cartoon)**: **The Critic – Ernest Pintoff**; Automania 2000 – John Halas; The Game – Dušan Vukotić; My Financial Career – Colin Low and Tom Daly; Pianissimo – Carmen D'Avino	**Best Music (Music Score -- Substantially Original)**: **Tom Jones – John Addison**; 55 Days at Peking – Dimitri Tiomkin; Cleopatra – Alex North; How the West Was Won – Alfred Newman and Ken Darby; It's a Mad, Mad, Mad, Mad World – Ernest Gold
**Best Music (Scoring of Music -- Adaptation or Treatment)**: **Irma la Douce – André Previn**; Bye Bye Birdie – Johnny Green; A New Kind of Love – Leith Stevens; Sundays and Cybele – Maurice Jarre; The Sword in the Stone – George Bruns	**Best Music (Song)**: **"Call Me Irresponsible" from Papa's Delicate Condition – Music by Jimmy Van Heusen; Lyrics by Sammy Cahn**; "Charade" from Charade – Music by Henry Mancini; Lyrics by Johnny Mercer; "It's a Mad Mad Mad Mad World" from It's a Mad, Mad, Mad, Mad World – Music by Ernest Gold; Lyrics by Mack David; "More" from Mondo Cane – Music by Riz Ortolani and Nino Oliviero; Lyrics by Norman Newell; "So Little Time" from 55 Days at Peking – Music by Dimitri Tiomkin; Lyrics by Paul Francis Webster
**Best Sound**: **How the West Was Won – Franklin Milton**; Bye Bye Birdie – Charles Rice; Captain Newman, M.D. – Waldon O. Watson; Cleopatra – James Corcoran and Fred Hynes; It's a Mad, Mad, Mad, Mad World – Gordon E. Sawyer	**Best Sound Effects**: **It's a Mad, Mad, Mad, Mad World – Walter Elliott**; A Gathering of Eagles – Robert Bratton
**Best Art Direction (Black-and-White)**: **America America – Art Direction and Set Decoration: Gene Callahan**; 8½ – Art Direction and Set Decoration: Piero Gherardi; Hud – Art Direction: Hal Pereira and Tambi Larsen; Set Decoration: Samuel M. Comer and Robert R. Benton; Love with the Proper Stranger – Art Direction: Hal Pereira and Roland Anderson; Set Decoration: Samuel M. Comer and Grace Gregory; Twilight of Honor – Art Direction: George Davis and Paul Groesse; Set Decoration: Henry Grace and Hugh Hunt	**Best Art Direction (Color)**: **Cleopatra – Art Direction: John DeCuir, Jack Martin Smith, Hilyard M. Brown, Herman A. Blumenthal, Elven Webb, Maurice Pelling, and Boris Juraga; Set Decoration: Walter M. Scott, Paul S. Fox, and Ray Moyer**; The Cardinal – Art Direction: Lyle R. Wheeler; Set Decoration: Gene Callahan; Come Blow Your Horn – Art Direction: Hal Pereira and Roland Anderson; Set Decoration: Samuel M. Comer and James W. Payne; How the West Was Won – Art Direction: George Davis, William Ferrari (posthumous nomination), and Addison Hehr; Set Decoration: Henry Grace, Don Greenwood Jr., and Jack Mills; Tom Jones – Art Direction: Ralph W. Brinton, Ted Marshall, and Jocelyn Herbert; Set Decoration: Josie MacAvin
**Best Cinematography (Black-and-White)**: **Hud – James Wong Howe**; The Balcony – George J. Folsey; The Caretakers – Lucien Ballard; Lilies of the Field – Ernest Haller; Love with the Proper Stranger – Milton Krasner	**Best Cinematography (Color)**: **Cleopatra – Leon Shamroy**; The Cardinal – Leon Shamroy; How the West Was Won – William Daniels, Milton Krasner, Charles Lang, and Joseph LaShelle; Irma la Douce – Joseph LaShelle; It's a Mad, Mad, Mad, Mad World – Ernest Laszlo
**Best Costume Design (Black-and-White)**: **8½ – Piero Gherardi**; Love with the Proper Stranger – Edith Head; The Stripper – Travilla; Toys in the Attic – Bill Thomas; Wives and Lovers – Edith Head	**Best Costume Design (Color)**: **Cleopatra – Irene Sharaff, Vittorio Nino Novarese, and Renié**; The Cardinal – Donald Brooks; How the West Was Won – Walter Plunkett; The Leopard – Piero Tosi; A New Kind of Love – Edith Head
**Best Film Editing**: **How the West Was Won – Harold F. Kress**; Cleopatra – Dorothy Spencer; The Cardinal – Louis R. Loeffler; The Great Escape – Ferris Webster; It's a Mad, Mad, Mad, Mad World – Frederic Knudtson (posthumous nomination), Robert C. Jones, and Gene Fowler Jr.	**Best Special Effects**: **Cleopatra – Emil Kosa Jr.**; The Birds – Ub Iwerks

=== Irving G. Thalberg Memorial Award ===
- Sam Spiegel

== Presenters and performers ==
=== Presenters ===
- Julie Andrews (Presenter: Best Foreign Language Film)
- Anne Bancroft (Presenter: Best Actor)
- Anne Baxter and Fred MacMurray (Presenter: Art Direction Awards)
- Ed Begley (Presenter: Best Supporting Actress)
- Rita Hayworth (Presenter: Best Director)
- Sammy Davis Jr. (Presenter: Music Awards)
- Angie Dickinson (Presenter: Best Special Effects)
- Patty Duke (Presenter: Best Supporting Actor)
- Shirley Jones (Presenter: Best Song)
- Shirley MacLaine (Presenter: Short Subjects Awards)
- Steve McQueen (Presenter: Sound Awards)
- Gregory Peck (Presenter: Best Actress)
- Sidney Poitier (Presenter: Best Film Editing)
- Donna Reed (Presenter: Costume Design Awards)
- Debbie Reynolds (Presenter: Documentary Awards)
- Edward G. Robinson (Presenter: Writing Awards)
- Frank Sinatra (Presenter: Best Picture)
- James Stewart (Presenter: Cinematography Awards)
- Tuesday Weld (Presenter: Best Sound Effects)

=== Performers ===
- James Darren ("It's a Mad, Mad, Mad, Mad World" from It's a Mad, Mad, Mad, Mad World)
- Harve Presnell ("So Little Time" from 55 Days at Peking)
- Katyna Ranieri ("More" from Mondo Cane)
- Andy Williams ("Call Me Irresponsible" from Papa's Delicate Condition and "Charade" from Charade)

== Multiple nominations and awards ==
Films with multiple nominations
Nominations	Film
10	Tom Jones
9	Cleopatra
8	How the West Was Won
7	Hud
6	The Cardinal
6	It's a Mad, Mad, Mad, Mad World
5	8½
5	Lilies of the Field
5	Love with the Proper Stranger
4	America America
3	Captain Newman, M.D.
3	Irma la Douce
2	55 Days at Peking
2	Bye Bye Birdie
2	A New Kind of Love
2	Sundays and Cybele
2	This Sporting Life
2	Twilight of Honor

Films with multiple awards
Awards	Film
4	Cleopatra
4	Tom Jones
3	How the West Was Won
3	Hud
2	8½

== Sidney Poitier winning Best Actor ==
Sidney Poitier's Best Actor win for Lilies of the Field marked the first time a Black man won a competitive Oscar. This came five years after his first nomination for Best Actor in 1958's The Defiant Ones. Poitier had been aware of the significance of Hattie McDaniel having won an Oscar in the 1940 ceremony at the time that he accepted his Best Actor Oscar, and he was the only winner of an acting award present at the ceremony.

It would take almost forty years for another African-American male to win Best Actor, when Denzel Washington won in 2001 for Training Day.

== Sammy Davis Jr. envelope error ==
Sammy Davis Jr. was accidentally given the wrong winner's envelope when he was supposed to announce the award for Best Music Score for an Adaptation or Treatment, instead announcing the winner for Best Music Score - Substantially Original: John Addison for Tom Jones. After a confused round of applause followed by silence, Davis acknowledged his mistake (joking, "Wait 'til the NAACP hears about this!"), and, having been given the right envelope, read the actual winner: Andre Previn for Irma la Douce.

Davis Jr. then presented Best Music Score - Substantially Original, sarcastically asking "Guess who the winner is?" after reading all the nominees.

== See also ==
- 21st Golden Globe Awards
- 1963 in film
- 6th Grammy Awards
- 15th Primetime Emmy Awards
- 16th Primetime Emmy Awards
- 17th British Academy Film Awards
- 17th Tony Awards
- List of submissions to the 36th Academy Awards for Best Foreign Language Film
