= 1964 Academy Awards =

1964 Academy Awards may refer to:

- 36th Academy Awards, the Academy Awards ceremony that took place in 1964
- 37th Academy Awards, the 1965 ceremony honoring the best in film for 1964
