= 1963 Academy Awards =

1963 Academy Awards may refer to:

- 35th Academy Awards, the Academy Awards ceremony that took place in 1963
- 36th Academy Awards, the 1964 ceremony honoring the best in film for 1963
