= The Cardinal =

1963 film by Otto Preminger

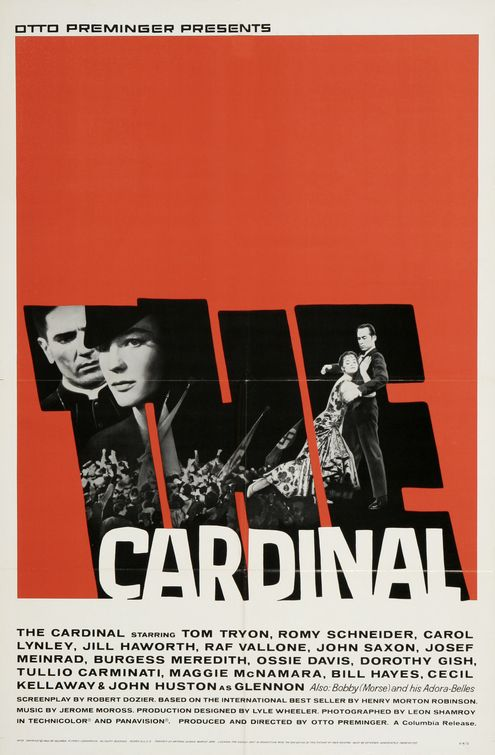
- Promotional poster by Saul Bass
- Directed by: Otto Preminger
- Screenplay by: Robert Dozier
- Based on: The Cardinal by Henry Morton Robinson
- Produced by: Otto Preminger
- Starring: Tom Tryon; Romy Schneider; Carol Lynley; Jill Haworth; Raf Vallone; Josef Meinrad; Burgess Meredith; Ossie Davis; John Saxon; Dorothy Gish; Tullio Carminati; Maggie McNamara; Bill Hayes; Cecil Kellaway; John Huston; Robert Morse
- Cinematography: Leon Shamroy
- Edited by: Louis R. Loeffler
- Music by: Jerome Moross
- Production company: Gamma Productions
- Distributed by: Columbia Pictures
- Release dates: December 12, 1963 (Boston); December 23, 1963 (United States)
- Running time: 175 minutes
- Country: United States
- Language: English
- Box office: $11,170,588

The Cardinal is a 1963 American drama film produced independently, directed by Otto Preminger and distributed by Columbia Pictures. The screenplay was written by Robert Dozier, based on the novel by Henry Morton Robinson. The music score was written by Jerome Moross.

The film's cast features Tom Tryon, Romy Schneider and John Huston, and it was nominated for six Academy Awards. It marks the final appearance by veteran film star Dorothy Gish, as well as the last big-screen performance of Maggie McNamara.

The film was shot on location in Rome, Vienna, Boston and Stamford, Connecticut.

Robinson's novel was based on the life of Francis Cardinal Spellman, who was then Archbishop of New York. The story touches on various social issues, such as interfaith marriage, sex outside marriage, abortion, racial bigotry, the rise of fascism, and war.

== Plot ==
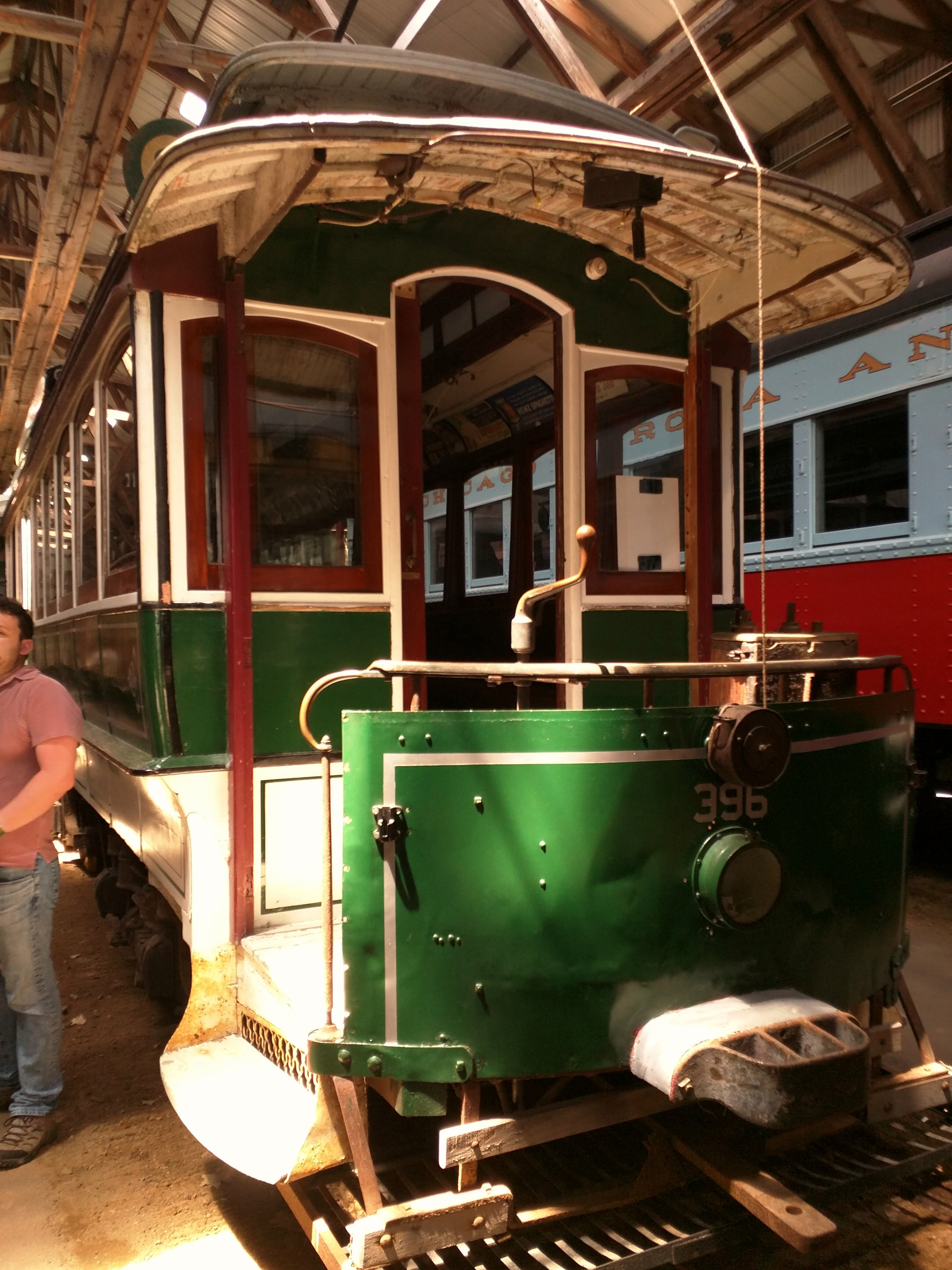
This former Boston streetcar was restored to its 1915 Boston Elevated Railway livery for scenes in the film.

The film is shown as a series of memory flashbacks during a formal ceremony where the protagonist is instituted as a cardinal.

A newly ordained Irish Catholic priest, Stephen Fermoyle, returns home to Boston in 1917. He discovers that his parents are upset about daughter Mona having become engaged to marry a Jewish man, Benny Rampell. Stephen and his Irish Catholic family will only permit Mona to marry Benny if he becomes a Catholic or agrees to raise any children as Catholic, as demanded by the papal bull Ne Temere (superseded in 1970). Benny does not agree and leaves to serve in World War I. Mona seeks Stephen's counsel as a priest. After he tells her to give Benny up, she runs away and becomes promiscuous.

Concerned about the young priest's ambition, the Archbishop of Boston Cardinal Lawrence Glennon assigns Stephen to an out-of-the-way parish where it is hoped that he will learn humility. There he meets the humble pastor, Father Ned Halley, and Stephen observes the unpretentious way in which he lives his life and treats his parishioners. Father Halley is very sick with multiple sclerosis. Stephen learns humility from him and his housekeeper, Lalage Menton.

Meanwhile, Mona becomes pregnant out of wedlock. Stephen, his brother Frank and Benny find Mona in agony because her pelvis is too small for a large baby. She is taken to the hospital, where Dr. Parks tells Stephen that it is too late to perform a caesarean section and in order to save Mona, the head of the baby must be crushed. Stephen will not allow Dr. Parks to do so, because according to Catholic doctrine, the baby may not be killed. Mona dies giving birth to the child, Regina.

Racked with guilt over the death of his sister, Stephen suffers a crisis of faith, so he is transferred to Europe and made a monsignor, but he is unsure of how committed he is to a life in the clergy, and he travels to Vienna, taking a two-year sabbatical by working as a lecturer. There he meets and enters into a relationship with a young woman, Annemarie von Hartmann. Stephen does not violate his vows.

Stephen's vocation calls him back to Rome and the church. The Vatican returns him to the United States on a mission in the American South to assist a black priest named Father Gillis who is opposed by the Ku Klux Klan. After successfully handling the assignment, Stephen is consecrated as a bishop, with Father Gillis present for the consecration.

Stephen is sent back to Austria to persuade Cardinal Theodor Innitzer not to cooperate with the Nazi government, with a threat of a world war looming over all. He and Innitzer ultimately must flee for their lives. He manages to see Annemarie one last time after she has been imprisoned by the Nazi authorities. After the success of the missions on which the Vatican had sent him, he is elevated to the College of Cardinals. On the eve of World War II, a ceremony is held in which Stephen formally becomes a cardinal. He warns about the dangers of totalitarianism and pledges to dedicate the rest of his life to his work.

== Cast ==
- Tom Tryon as Stephen Fermoyle
- Romy Schneider as Annemarie von Hartmann
- Carol Lynley as Mona Fermoyle / Regina Fermoyle
- Jill Haworth as Lalage Menton
- Raf Vallone as Cardinal Quarenghi
- Josef Meinrad as Cardinal Theodor Innitzer
- Burgess Meredith as Father Ned Halley
- Ossie Davis as Father Gillis
- John Saxon as Benny Rampell
- Dorothy Gish as Celia Fermoyle
- Tullio Carminati as Cardinal Giacobbi
- Maggie McNamara as Florrie Fermoyle
- Bill Hayes as Frank Fermoyle
- Cecil Kellaway as Monsignor Monaghan
- John Huston as Cardinal Lawrence Glennon
- Robert Morse as Bobby
- Murray Hamilton as Lafe
- Patrick O'Neal as Cecil Turner
- Loring Smith as Cornelius J. Deegan
- Jose Duval as Ramon Gongaro
- Peter Weck as Kurt von Hartmann
- Rudolf Forster as Drunk Man
- Donald Hayne as Father Eberling
- Cameron Prud'Homme as Din Fermoyle
- Russ Brown as Dr. Heller
- Matthias Fuchs as Father Neidermoser
- Pat Henning as Hercule Menton
- Chill Wills as Monsignor Whittle
- Wolfgang Preiss as SS Major
- Vilma Degischer as Sister Wilhemina
- Doro Merande as Picket
- Jurgen Wilde as Lieutenant
- Arthur Hunnicut as Sheriff Dubrow
- Dino Di Luca as Monsignor
- Eric Van Nuys as Dr. Parks
- Erik Frey as Arthur Seyss-Inquart
- Billy Reed as MC
- James Hickman as Father Lyons
- Berenice Gahm as Mrs. Ramble
- Peter MacLean as Father Callahan
- Wolf Albach-Retty as Baron Hartmann

== Production ==
The script was credited to Robert Dozier but featured uncredited contributions by Ring Lardner Jr. who worked with Otto Preminger in developing characterizations and story structure. Along with eventual choice Carol Lynley, Ann-Margret, Shirley Knight, Dolores Hart, and Pamela Tiffin were considered for the role of Mona Fermoyle.

Saul Bass was not only responsible for designing the film's poster and advertising campaign but also the film titles, during which Bass transforms a walk through the Vatican into an abstract play of horizontal and vertical lines.

== Release ==
The film had its world premiere at the Saxon Theatre in Boston, Massachusetts. It was the first film to be shown in 70 mm despite being shot on 35 mm movie film for some roadshow releases, using a "print-up" (blow up) process.

== Reception ==
=== Box-office performance ===
The Cardinal was the 18th highest-grossing film of the year. It grossed $11,170,588 in the United States, earning $5.46 million in domestic rentals.

=== Critical reception ===
On the review aggregator website Rotten Tomatoes, 47% of 15 critics' reviews are positive, with an average rating of 5.9/10.

=== Accolades ===
Award	Category	Nominee(s)	Result	Ref.
Academy Awards	Best Director	Otto Preminger	Nominated	
Academy Awards	Best Supporting Actor	John Huston	Nominated	
Academy Awards	Best Art Direction – Color	Art Direction: Lyle R. Wheeler; Set Decoration: Gene Callahan	Nominated	
Academy Awards	Best Cinematography – Color	Leon Shamroy	Nominated	
Academy Awards	Best Costume Design – Color	Donald Brooks	Nominated	
Academy Awards	Best Film Editing	Louis R. Loeffler	Nominated	
Golden Globe Awards	Best Motion Picture – Drama (Note: The film won this category (marking the third time, following East of Eden and Spartacus), and (to date) the most recent film to win the category without later being nominated for the Academy Award for Best Picture.)		Won	
Golden Globe Awards	Best Actor in a Motion Picture – Drama	Tom Tryon	Nominated	
Golden Globe Awards	Best Actress in a Motion Picture – Drama	Romy Schneider	Nominated	
Golden Globe Awards	Best Supporting Actor – Motion Picture	John Huston	Won	
Golden Globe Awards	Best Director – Motion Picture	Otto Preminger	Nominated	
Golden Globe Awards	Best Film Promoting International Understanding		Nominated	
Laurel Awards	Top Drama		Nominated	
Laurel Awards	Top Male Dramatic Performance	Tom Tryon	5th Place	
Laurel Awards	Top Male Supporting Performance	John Huston	Nominated	
National Board of Review Awards	Top Ten Films		10th Place	

=== Honors ===
The film was nominated by the American Film Institute for its AFI's 100 Years of Film Scores list.

== Preservation ==
The Cardinal was preserved by the Academy Film Archive in 2012.

== See also ==
- List of American films of 1963
