= National Board of Review Awards 1963 =

Annual US film awards ceremony

35th National Board of Review Awards

December 22, 1963

The 35th National Board of Review Awards were announced on December 22, 1963.

== Top ten films ==
1. Tom Jones
2. Lilies of the Field
3. All the Way Home
4. Hud
5. This Sporting Life
6. Lord of the Flies
7. The L-Shaped Room
8. The Great Escape
9. How the West Was Won
10. The Cardinal

== Top foreign films ==
1. 8½
2. The Four Days of Naples
3. Winter Light
4. The Leopard
5. Any Number Can Win

== Winners ==
- Best Film: Tom Jones
- Best Foreign Film: 8½
- Best Actor: Rex Harrison (Cleopatra)
- Best Actress: Patricia Neal (Hud)
- Best Supporting Actor: Melvyn Douglas (Hud)
- Best Supporting Actress: Margaret Rutherford (The V.I.P.s)
- Best Director: Tony Richardson (Tom Jones)
