= Cleopatra (1963 film) =

1963 film by Joseph L. Mankiewicz

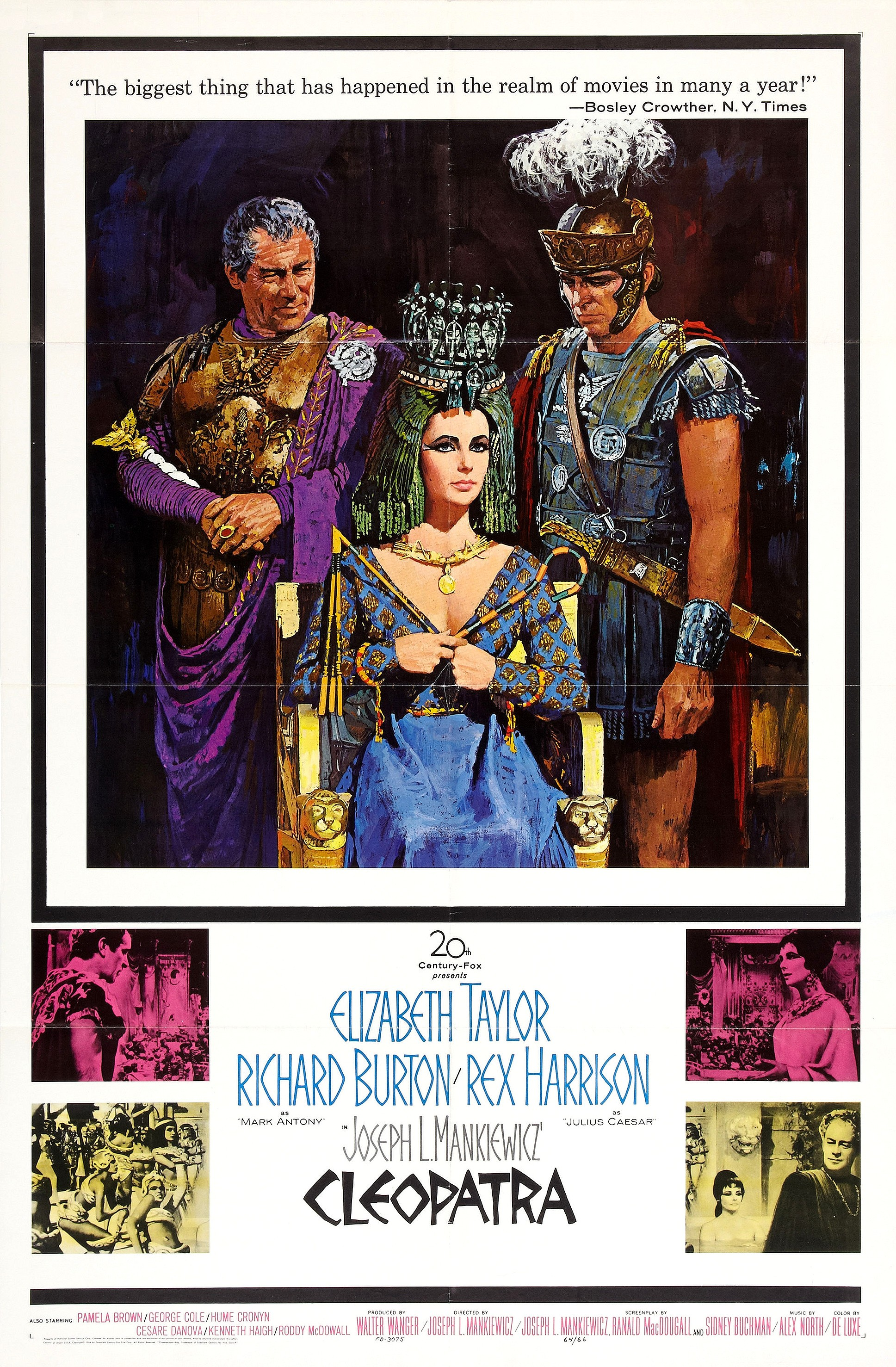
- Theatrical release poster
- Directed by: Joseph L. Mankiewicz
- Screenplay by: Joseph L. Mankiewicz; Ranald MacDougall; Sidney Buchman
- Based on: The Life and Times of Cleopatra by Carlo Maria Franzero Histories by Plutarch, Suetonius, and Appian
- Produced by: Walter Wanger
- Starring: Elizabeth Taylor; Richard Burton; Rex Harrison; Pamela Brown; George Cole; Hume Cronyn; Cesare Danova; Kenneth Haigh; Roddy McDowall
- Cinematography: Leon Shamroy
- Edited by: Dorothy Spencer
- Music by: Alex North
- Distributed by: 20th Century-Fox
- Release date: June 12, 1963
- Running time: c. 251 minutes
- Country: United States
- Language: English
- Budget: $31.1 million
- Box office: $57.8 million (US and Canada) $40.3 million (worldwide theatrical rental)

Cleopatra is a 1963 American epic historical drama film directed by Joseph L. Mankiewicz, who co-wrote the screenplay with Ranald MacDougall and Sidney Buchman, adapted from the 1957 book The Life and Times of Cleopatra by Carlo Maria Franzero, and from histories by Plutarch, Suetonius, and Appian. The film stars Elizabeth Taylor in the eponymous role, along with Richard Burton, Rex Harrison, Roddy McDowall and Martin Landau. It chronicles the struggles of the young queen Cleopatra VII of Egypt to resist the imperial ambitions of Rome.

Walter Wanger had long contemplated producing a biographical film about Cleopatra. In 1958, his production company partnered with Twentieth Century Fox to produce the film. Following an extensive casting search, Taylor signed on to portray the title role for a record-setting salary of $1 million. Rouben Mamoulian was hired as director, and the script underwent numerous revisions from Nigel Balchin, Dale Wasserman, Lawrence Durrell, and Nunnally Johnson. Principal photography began at Pinewood Studios in September 1960, but Taylor's health problems delayed further filming. Production was suspended in November after it had gone over budget with only ten minutes of usable footage.

Mamoulian resigned as director and was replaced by Mankiewicz, who had directed Taylor in Suddenly, Last Summer (1959). Production was re-located to Cinecittà, where filming resumed on September 25, 1961, without a finished shooting script. During filming, a personal scandal made worldwide headlines when it was reported that co-stars Taylor and Richard Burton had an adulterous affair. Filming wrapped on July 28, 1962, and further reshoots were made from February to March 1963. With the estimated production costs totaling $31 million (not counting the $5 million spent on the aborted British shoot), the film became the most expensive film ever made up to that point and nearly bankrupted the studio. The cost of distribution, print and advertising expenses added a further $13 million to Fox's costs.

Cleopatra premiered at the Rivoli Theatre in New York City on June 12, 1963. It received a generally favorable response from American film critics, but an unfavorable one in Europe. It became the highest-grossing film of 1963, earning box-office receipts of $57.7 million in the United States and Canada, and one of the highest-grossing films of the decade at a worldwide level. However, the film initially lost money because of its production and marketing costs totaling $44 million ($463 million in 2025). It received nine nominations at the 36th Academy Awards, including for Best Picture, and won four: Best Art Direction (Color), Best Cinematography (Color), Best Visual Effects and Best Costume Design (Color).

== Plot ==
After the Battle of Pharsalus in 48 BC, Julius Caesar goes to Egypt, under the pretext of being named the executor of the will of the father of the young Pharaoh Ptolemy XIII and his older sister and co-ruler, Cleopatra. Ptolemy and Cleopatra are in the midst of their own civil war, and she has been driven out of the city of Alexandria. Ptolemy rules alone under the care of his three "guardians": the chief eunuch Pothinus, his tutor Theodotus and General Achillas.

Cleopatra convinces Caesar to restore her throne from Ptolemy. Caesar, in effective control of the kingdom, sentences Pothinus to death for arranging an assassination attempt on Cleopatra, and banishes Ptolemy to the eastern desert, where he and his outnumbered army would face certain death against Mithridates. Cleopatra is crowned queen of Egypt and begins to dream of ruling the world with Caesar, who in turn wishes to become king of Rome. When their son Caesarion is born, Caesar accepts him publicly, which becomes the talk of Rome and the Senate.

After being made dictator for life, Caesar sends for Cleopatra. She arrives in Rome in a lavish procession and wins the adulation of the Roman people. The Senate grows increasingly discontented amid rumors that Caesar wishes to be made king. On the Ides of March in 44 BC, a group of conspirators assassinate Caesar and flee the city, starting a rebellion. An alliance among Octavian (Caesar's adopted son), Mark Antony (Caesar's right-hand man and general) and Marcus Aemilius Lepidus puts down the rebellion and splits the republic. Cleopatra is angered when she finds Caesar's will recognizes Octavian, rather than Caesarion, as his official heir and returns to Egypt.

While planning a campaign against Parthia in the east, Antony realizes that he needs money and supplies that only Egypt can sufficiently provide. After repeatedly refusing to leave Egypt, Cleopatra acquiesces and meets him on her royal barge in Tarsus. The two begin a love affair. Octavian's removal of Lepidus forces Antony to return to Rome, where he marries Octavian's sister Octavia to prevent political conflict. This enrages Cleopatra. Antony and Cleopatra reconcile. Octavian, incensed, reads Antony's will to the Roman senate, revealing that Antony wishes to be buried in Egypt. Rome turns against Antony, and Octavian's call for war against Egypt receives a rapturous response. The war is decided at the naval Battle of Actium on September 2, 31 BC, where Octavian's fleet, under the command of Agrippa, defeats the lead ships of the Antony-Egyptian fleet. Assuming Antony is dead, Cleopatra orders the Egyptian forces home. Antony follows her, leaving his fleet leaderless and soon defeated.

Months later, Cleopatra sends Caesarion under disguise out of Alexandria. She also convinces Antony to resume command of his troops and fight Octavian's advancing armies. However, Antony's soldiers abandon him during the night. Rufio, the last man loyal to Antony, kills himself. Antony tries to goad Octavian into single combat, but is eventually forced to flee into the city. When Antony returns to the palace, Apollodorus, who was in love with Cleopatra himself, tells him she is in her tomb as she had instructed, and lets Antony believe she is dead. Antony falls on his own sword. Apollodorus then confesses that he lied to Antony and assists him to the tomb where Cleopatra and two servants had taken refuge. Antony dies in Cleopatra's arms.

Octavian and his army march into Alexandria with Caesarion's dead body in a wagon. He discovers the dead body of Apollodorus, who had poisoned himself. He then receives word that Antony is dead and Cleopatra is holed up in a tomb. There he offers to allow her to rule Egypt as a Roman province if she accompanies him to Rome. Cleopatra, knowing that her son is dead, agrees to Octavian's terms, including a pledge on the life of her son not to harm herself. After Octavian departs, she orders for her servants to assist with her suicide. Discovering that she was going to kill herself, Octavian and his guards burst into Cleopatra's chamber to find her dead, dressed in gold, along with her servants and the asp that killed her.

== Cast ==
- Elizabeth Taylor as Cleopatra VII
- Richard Burton as Mark Antony
- Rex Harrison as Julius Caesar
- Pamela Brown as a High Priestess of Isis
- George Cole as Flavius
- Hume Cronyn as Sosigenes
- Cesare Danova as Apollodorus
- Kenneth Haigh as Brutus
- Andrew Keir as Agrippa
- Martin Landau as Rufio
- Roddy McDowall as Octavian
- Robert Stephens as Germanicus
- Francesca Annis as Eiras
- Grégoire Aslan as Pothinus
- Martin Benson as Ramese
- Herbert Berghof as Theodotus of Chios
- John Cairney as Phoebus
- Jacqui Chan as Lotus
- Isabel Cooley as Charmian
- John Doucette as Achillas
- Andrew Faulds as Canidius
- Michael Gwynn as Cimber
- Michael Hordern as Cicero
- John Hoyt as Cassius
- Marne Maitland as Euphranor
- Carroll O'Connor as Servilius Casca
- Richard O'Sullivan as Ptolemy XIII
- Gwen Watford as Calpurnia
- Douglas Wilmer as Decimus
- Marina Berti as Queen at Tarsus (uncredited)
- John Karlsen as a High Priest of Isis (uncredited)
- Loris Loddi as Caesarion, age 4 (uncredited)
  - Del Russel as Caesarion, age 7 (uncredited)
  - Kenneth Nash as Caesarion, age 12 (uncredited)
- Jean Marsh as Octavia the Younger (uncredited)
- Gin Mart as Marcellus (uncredited)
- Furio Meniconi as Mithridates (uncredited)
- John Valva as Valvus (uncredited)
- Finlay Currie as Titus (uncredited)
- Laurence Naismith as Archesilius (uncredited)

== Production ==
Walter Wanger had long desired to produce a biographical film about Cleopatra. As an undergraduate at Dartmouth College, he first read Théophile Gautier's 1838 story "One of Cleopatra's Nights" and then Thomas North's 1579 English translation of Plutarch's Lives and William Shakespeare's Antony and Cleopatra. Wanger had envisioned Cleopatra as "the quintessence of youthful femininity, of womanliness and strength," but it was not until he watched Elizabeth Taylor in A Place in the Sun (1951) that he found his ideal candidate for the role.

Around this time, Wanger had discovered through a private detective that his wife, Joan Bennett, was having an affair with her talent agent Jennings Lang. On the afternoon of December 13, 1951, Wanger shot Lang twice after having spotted him with Bennett in a parking lot near MCA. Lang survived, and Wanger, pleading insanity, served four months in prison at the Castaic Honor Farm, north of Los Angeles. Following his release, Wanger achieved a career comeback when he produced Invasion of the Body Snatchers (1956) and I Want to Live! (1958), for which Susan Hayward won the Academy Award for Best Actress. He would soon return to his dream project of a Cleopatra biographical film.

=== Development ===
Wanger pitched the idea to various film studios, including Monogram and RKO Pictures. He also approached Taylor and her husband Michael Todd about producing the project with United Artists. Taylor expressed interest in the project but delegated the decision to Todd. Meanwhile, Twentieth Century Fox was in financial trouble following its severe box office losses of The Barbarian and the Geisha, A Certain Smile and The Roots of Heaven, all released in 1958. To reverse the studio's fortunes, studio president Spyros Skouras requested that studio executive David Brown find a viable project that would be a "big picture." Brown suggested a remake of Cleopatra (1917), which had starred Theda Bara.

In the fall of 1958, Wanger's production company entered into a coproduction agreement with Twentieth Century Fox. Wanger pitched four properties—Cleopatra, Justine, The Dud Avocado, and The Fall—for the executives to consider. They selected the first three, and Cleopatra was the first to enter into production. On September 15, Wanger purchased the screen rights to Carlo Mario Franzero's biography The Life and Times of Cleopatra. On September 30, Skouras held his first meeting with Wanger, and asked his secretary to retrieve the screenplay for the 1917 version of Cleopatra. Skouras insisted, "All this needs is a little rewriting. Just give me this over again and we'll make a lot of money." Because the original screenplay had been written for a silent film, the script mostly contained instructions for camera setups.

In December 1958, Ludi Claire, a writer and former actress, was hired to write a rough draft of the script. That same month, art director John DeCuir was hired to produce conceptual artwork to illustrate the visual scale of the project. In March 1959, English author Nigel Balchin was hired to write another script draft. Meanwhile, Wanger had approached Alfred Hitchcock to direct the film, having worked with him on Foreign Correspondent (1940), but Hitchcock declined. Skouras then selected Rouben Mamoulian, who had worked with Wanger on Applause (1929), to direct.

Mamoulian was hired on October 2, 1959. Balchin's script pleased neither Mamoulian nor Taylor, who felt that the first act was forced and that Cleopatra lacked sufficient characterization. Based on his recently aired I, Don Quixote episode in the CBS anthology series DuPont Show of the Month, Dale Wasserman was selected to complete the final draft. Wanger instructed him to focus all attention on Cleopatra as the central role. Wasserman recounted that he had never met Taylor, so he watched her earlier films to better acquaint himself with her acting style. In the spring of 1960, English novelist Lawrence Durrell was hired to rewrite the script.

=== Casting ===
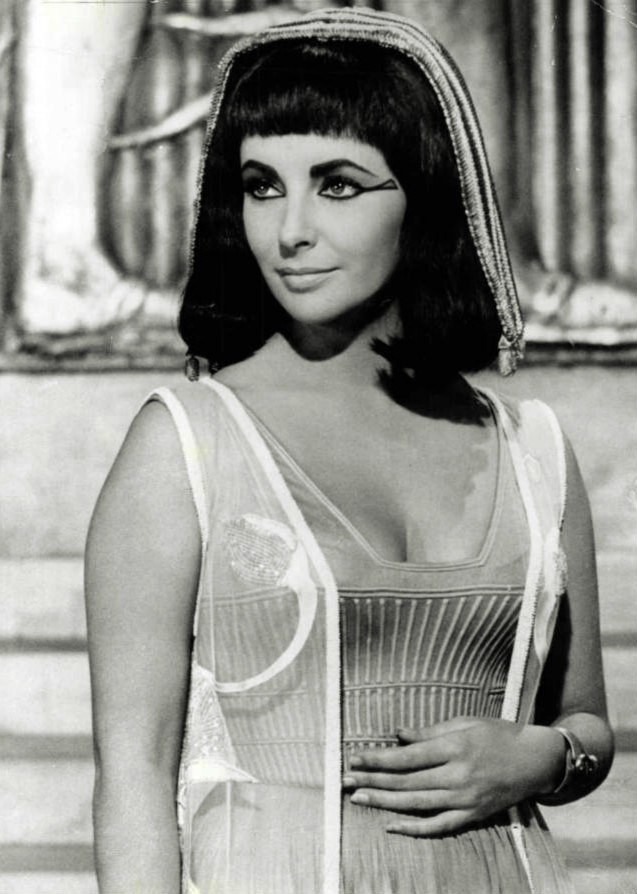
Taylor as Cleopatra

At a meeting, in October 1958, production head Buddy Adler favored a relatively cheap production of $2 million, with one of Fox's contract actresses, such as Joan Collins (who tested extensively for the part), Joanne Woodward or model Suzy Parker, in the title role. Wanger protested, envisioning a much more opulent epic with a voluptuous actress as Cleopatra. Wanger suggested Susan Hayward, and Audrey Hepburn, Sophia Loren, and Gina Lollobrigida were also under consideration. Hayward said she would have accepted if she were 10 years younger, Hepburn could not be loaned out to Fox because of her commitments to Paramount, and Lollobrigida told the studio, "I would like to play Queen Cleopatra if I hadn't just played the Queen of Sheba in Solomon and Sheba. Sorry." When Mamoulian was hired to direct, he had offered the title role to Dorothy Dandridge, during a lunch meeting at the Romanoff's restaurant in Beverly Hills. Dandridge replied, "You won't have the guts to go through with this... They are going to talk you out of it."

On September 1, 1959, Wanger phoned Taylor again on the set of Suddenly, Last Summer (1959) in London. Taylor's then-husband Eddie Fisher relayed the message, in which she half-jokingly stated: "Tell him I'll do it for a million dollars against 10 percent of the gross." Wanger replied he would convey Taylor's request back to the studio. He called back within an hour, stating, "We've got a deal." On October 15, a contract-signing event was staged inside Adler's office where Taylor signed blank papers because the real contract would not be ready for months. Wanger had considered Laurence Olivier and Rex Harrison for the role of Julius Caesar, and Richard Burton for Mark Antony. However, the studios refused to approve Harrison and Burton.

On July 28, 1960, Taylor signed a real contract. It was also stipulated that the film would be shot in Europe and in the Todd-AO format, developed by Taylor's late husband Mike Todd (who had died in 1958), which ensured that Taylor would receive additional royalties. The details included $125,000 for sixteen weeks; $50,000 for every week afterwards; $3,000 per week for living expenses; round-trip transportation for Taylor and her children; and a 16 mm print of the film.

In January 1960, Stephen Boyd was approached by Wanger about being cast as Mark Antony, but felt he was too young for the role. In August 1960, Boyd was cast as Mark Antony, Peter Finch as Julius Caesar and Keith Baxter as Octavian. Mamoulian had also cast Elisabeth Welch to portray one of Cleopatra's handmaidens.

=== Filming ===
==== Production under Rouben Mamoulian ====
With Mamoulian as director, construction on the Alexandria exteriors was already under way on the studio's backlot. London was also seen as a viable choice for hosting the production. The Eady Levy had offered financial incentives to American film studios as long as a certain percentage of the primary cast and production crew were English. There, the production would be supervised by Robert Goldstein, the studio's foreign head of production. A number of other countries, including Turkey and Egypt, were considered for exterior locations.

In 1960, Adler entered into a coproduction deal with Italian producer Lionello Santi, who had recently completed a foreign-language version of Cleopatra that the studio purchased to keep away from the American market. Mamoulian traveled to Italy for location scouting and reported back the difficulties upon shooting there. Furthermore, the impending Rome Summer Olympics threatened to complicate filming accommodations.

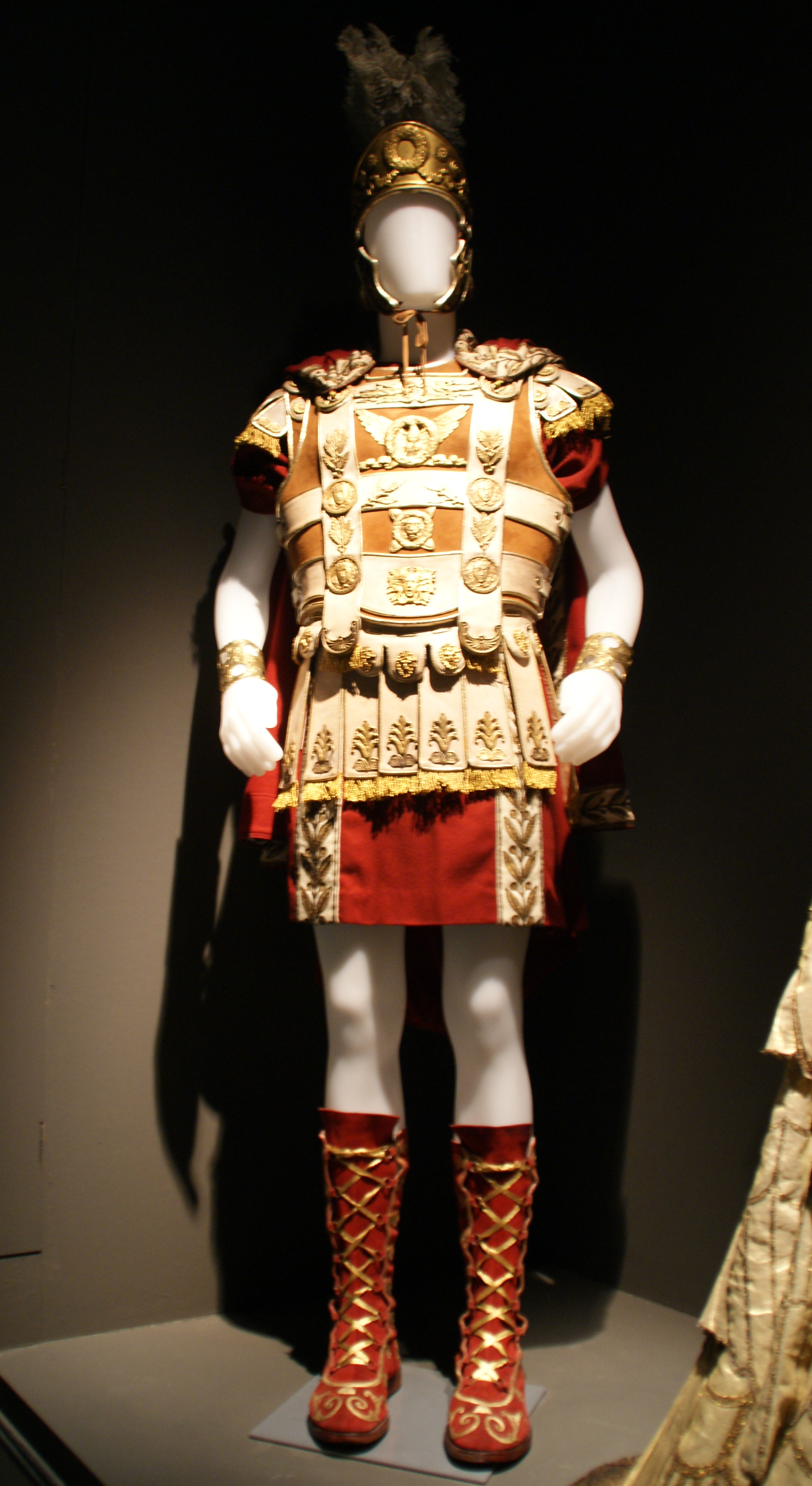
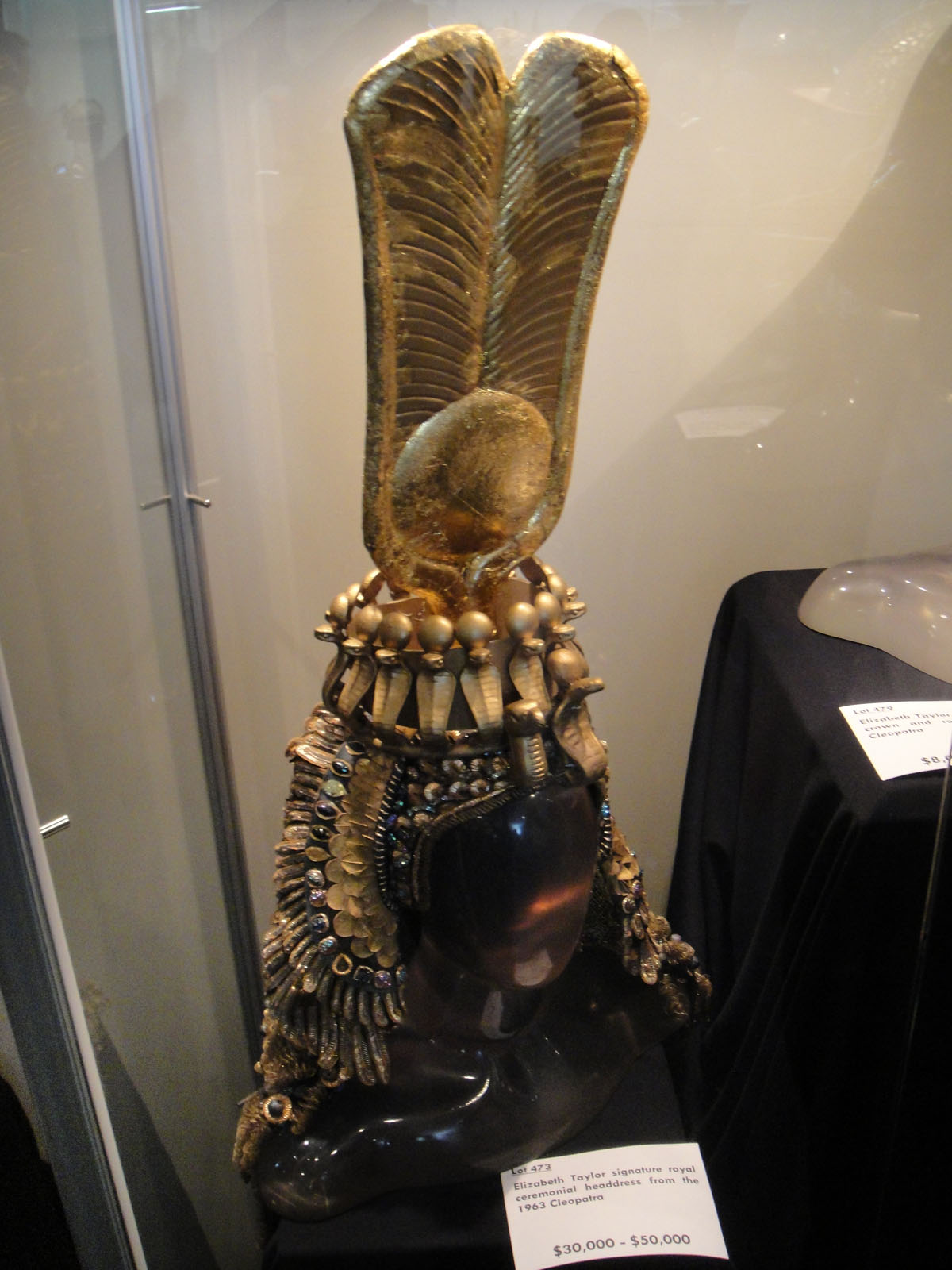
Left: Costume worn by Richard Burton in the film, displayed at the Cinecittà studios in Rome.
Right: Headdress worn by Elizabeth Taylor in the film.

On April 20, 1960, Santi issued a full-page ad in Variety announcing his forthcoming production of Cleopatra without mentioning Twentieth Century-Fox's involvement. Angered, Adler shifted the entire production to Pinewood Studios in London. On July 11, Adler died from cancer, and was replaced by Goldstein. Skouras asked Wanger to assume Goldstein's former position, but months later, he was replaced by Sid Rogell. Meanwhile, Wanger cautioned about shooting in England in a July 15 studio memo, stating that the weather conditions could jeopardize Taylor's health and the labor force was insufficient. However, Skouras had overruled his decision.

Principal photography began at Pinewood Studios on September 28, 1960. On the same day, the British hairdressers' union threatened to leave production, as Taylor had brought Sydney Guilaroff, an American hairstylist. A settlement was reached that Guilaroff would be allowed to style Taylor's hair, but only at her Dorchester suite. On the third day of shooting, Taylor called in sick, saying she had a cold, which made her unavailable for the next two weeks. Forced to proceed filming without Taylor, Mamoulian instead filmed scenes with Finch and Boyd, as well as multitudes of extras as Roman soldiers.

Taylor's cold soon progressed into a lingering fever, and for the next few weeks, she was treated by several doctors, including Lord Evans, Queen Elizabeth II's physician. On November 13, Taylor was rushed to the London Clinic when her fever reached 103 °F (39 °C). Rex Kennamer, Taylor's personal physician, flew out to London and diagnosed her with meningitis. By November 19, Wanger indefinitely postponed shooting, giving studio employees two weeks' notice until Taylor's health recovered. Taylor remained hospitalized for a week and then flew to Palm Springs, Florida, with husband Eddie Fisher to recuperate. The Lloyd's of London insurance agency paid $2 million to cover Taylor's medical expenses.

During the pause in filming, Nunnally Johnson was hired to write a new script. Johnson wrote a 75-page draft for the first half of the film, mostly involving Cleopatra and Julius Caesar, that was similar in its tone to that of Cecil B. DeMille's Cleopatra (1934) and Caesar and Cleopatra (1945). Back in New York, Skouras sent a copy of Johnson's shooting script to Joseph L. Mankiewicz for a frank critique. Displeased, Mankiewicz wrote back: "Cleopatra, as written, is a strange, frustrating mixture of an American soap-opera virgin and an hysterical Slavic vamp of the type Nazimova used to play."

Filming resumed on January 3, 1961, but Mamoulian was dissatisfied with Johnson's script. Taylor, who expressed similar displeasure, then appealed for Paddy Chayefsky to write a new script. Chayefsky demurred, saying that a rewrite would take six months. After sixteen weeks of filming and costs of $7 million, the crew had produced just ten minutes of usable film. Skouras blamed Mamoulian for the production having exceeded its budget. On January 18, 1961, Mamoulian resigned as director.

==== Joseph L. Mankiewicz takes over ====
To replace Mamoulian, Taylor announced that she would approve either George Stevens, who had directed her in A Place in the Sun, or Joseph L. Mankiewicz, who had directed her in Suddenly, Last Summer (1959). At the time, Mankiewicz was vacationing at the Children's Bay Cay—Hume Cronyn and Jessica Tandy's private island—in the Bahamas. He had completed a 151-page treatment outline and written a partially complete first screenplay draft for a film adaptation of Lawrence Durrell's novel Justine (which was also a Walter Wanger production). Mankiewicz initially declined the offer during a lunch meeting with Skouras and his agent Charles K. Feldman at the Colony Restaurant. Feldman persuaded Mankiewicz to take the job of directing Cleopatra under the advice: "Hold your nose for fifteen weeks and get it over with." Mankiewicz reconsidered, agreeing to write and direct the project.

"Mark Antony lived always in the shadow of Caesar...JLM sees Antony as a bad replica of Caesar, following desperately in Caesar's footsteps but rattling loosely in battlefield, in the Senate and in Caesar's bed. He sees this inability to match Caesar as the cause of Antony's excessive drinking and eccentric behavior. Antony's conquest of Cleopatra is his only triumph over Caesar. Then he realizes he has not conquered but has been conquered—and this leads to his ultimate self-destruction."

— Wanger on Mankiewicz's "modern, psychiatrically rooted concept" for Cleopatra

As an additional incentive, Skouras acquired Figaro, Inc., Mankiewicz's independent production company, for $3 million. In addition to his salary as writer and director, Mankiewicz received $1.5 million from the purchase, while his partner, NBC, received the other half. At the time, the combined expenses was the highest-paid salary ever paid for a film director.

Earlier in December 1960, Mankiewicz had read the previous shooting script, which he felt was "unreadable and unshootable". Familiar with ancient Rome, as he had directed Julius Caesar (1953), Mankiewicz asked to write a new script and the studio allowed him two months. By February 1961, Mankiewicz had conceived a "modern, psychiatrically rooted concept of the film," envisioning Marc Antony's self-destruction because of his "inability to match [Julius] Caesar."

Within one month, Lawrence Durrell and Sidney Buchman were recruited to collaborate with Mankiewicz on the new script. Story conferences were held with the three writers, and Durrell and Buchman then separately wrote "story-step" outlines. Mankiewicz would expand their outlines into a new script. Mankiewicz consulted the relevant sources, adapting historical literature written by Plutarch and Petronius. In late April, Mankiewicz had grown displeased with Durrell's work, while Buchman was instructed to complete an outline for the film. By then, Buchman's outline only covered the first quarter of the film. Mankiewicz had petitioned for playwrights Lillian Hellman or Paul Osborn to help finish the script, but Wanger hired screenwriter Ranald MacDougall.

Although filming was set to resume on April 4, 1961, Taylor was hospitalized again for pneumonia on March 4. One news agency erroneously reported that she had died. She recovered after a tracheotomy was performed on her throat. On March 14, Twentieth Century-Fox suspended production at Pinewood Studios. The sets were dismantled at the cost of $600,000 (equivalent to $6,500,000 in 2025). Skouras then decided to relocate the production to the studio's backlot in California. Meanwhile, Mankiewicz temporarily left his writing duties and scouted for suitable filming locations in Rome and Egypt. In June, Mankiewicz returned to the studio to report some Italian locations he had found, but was not eager to shoot in Egypt. On June 30, Skouras reversed his decision and agreed to allow Mankiewicz shoot the film at Cinecittà in Rome, where the sound stages had been occupied for the studio's television series and George Stevens's The Greatest Story Ever Told (1965).

However, in September 1961, Skouras had "indefinitely postponed" The Greatest Story Ever Told due to presumptive cost concerns. In Italy, the production was divided between two locations with the Roman Forum constructed on twelve acres at Cinecittà and the Alexandria sets near Anzio. During construction of the Alexandrian sets, active land mines from World War II were discovered along a private beach, thus demolition experts were hired to remove the explosives. Wanger was also troubled to learn NATO had held a nearby shooting range for target practice.

==== Casting and personnel changes ====
During the interim, Mankiewicz told Finch if he were available, he would retain his role as Julius Caesar when production resumed. However, Finch withdrew because of delays caused by Taylor's illnesses. To replace him, Laurence Olivier and Trevor Howard were each offered the role of Caesar, but declined. Rex Harrison, who was the studio's fourth choice, was then cast. Mankiewicz was not eager to keep Boyd, and then suggested Marlon Brando as Mark Antony but he was preoccupied with Mutiny on the Bounty (1962). Richard Burton landed the role after Taylor had seen him as King Arthur in the Broadway musical Camelot. Twentieth Century-Fox paid Burton $250,000 plus $50,000 to buy out his contract.

Roddy McDowall, who was also appearing in Camelot, was cast as Octavian. Mankiewicz also insisted on casting John Valva, McDowall's close friend, and created an original character named Valvus. By mid-September 1961, Canadian actor Hume Cronyn, several American actors, including Martin Landau and Carroll O'Connor, and several English actors, such as Kenneth Haigh, Robert Stephens and Michael Hordern, were cast in supporting roles.

Jack Hildyard had resigned as cinematographer when Mamoulian agreed to step down as director. He was replaced by Leon Shamroy. Shamroy had been the director of photography on The Robe (1953), the first movie shot in CinemaScope, and had shot South Pacific (1958) in the Todd-AO widescreen process that was being used in Cleopatra. (Shamroy would win his fourth Oscar for the film.) In January 1962, Andrew Marton was brought in as second-unit director, replacing Ray Kellogg. Marton had worked on the initial production at Pinewood Studios. John DeCuir was still kept as production designer.

==== Filming resumes in Rome ====
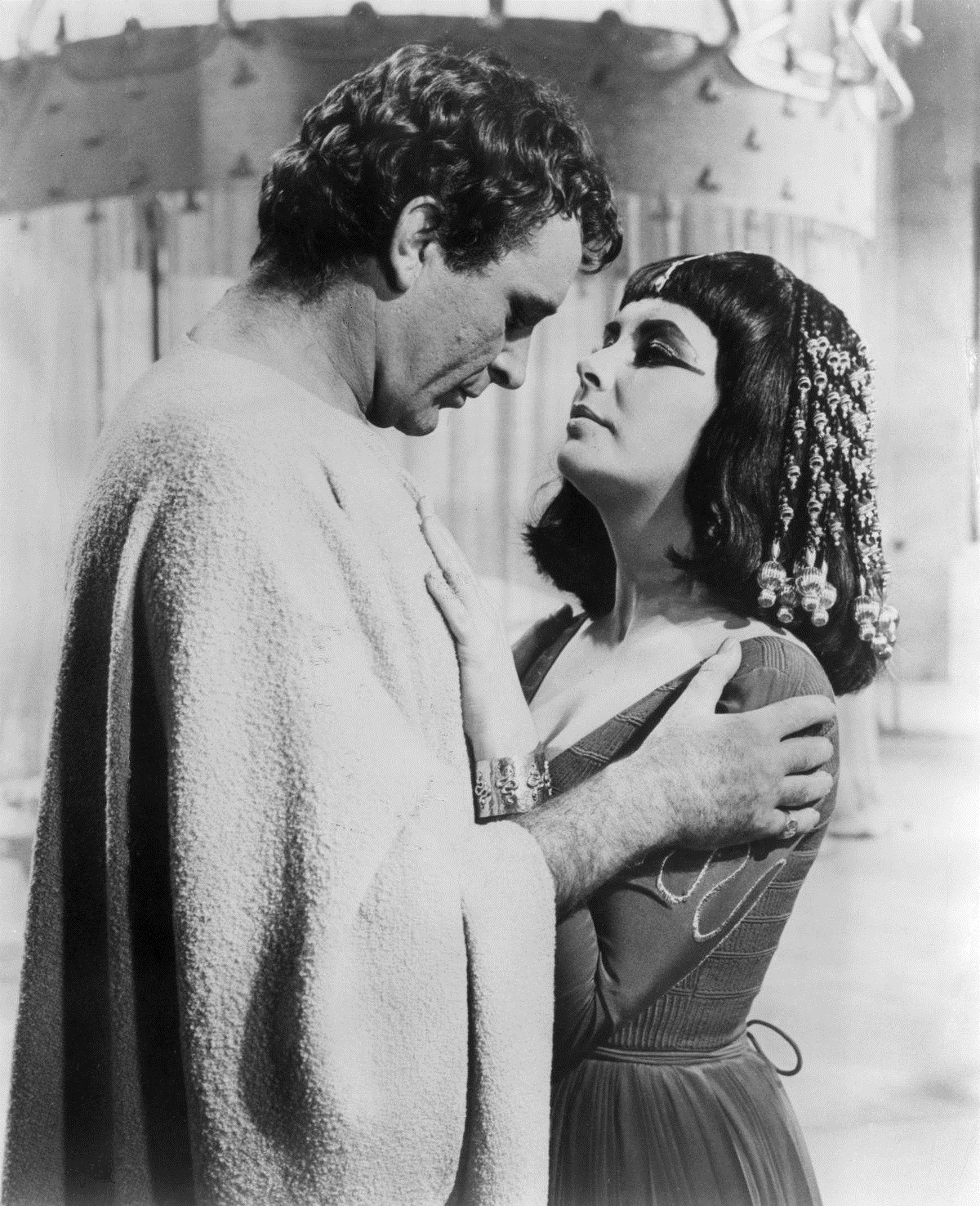
Richard Burton as Mark Antony with Taylor as Cleopatra

On September 25, 1961, principal photography began on the revamped production of Cleopatra. Mankiewicz had expressed his intention of directing a two-part epic: "I had in mind two separate but closely linked Elizabeth Taylor films—Caesar and Cleopatra and Antony and Cleopatra—each to run three hours, both segments to receive simultaneous release. Moreover, I felt compelled to undertake the writing of both halves myself, a measure of my total dissatisfaction with the material that had been produced to date."

At that time, he had completed 132 pages of the shooting script, with another 195 pages that remained to be written, so Mankiewicz shot the film in sequence, leaving several actors waiting indefinitely until their scenes were ready to be shot. For the first few months of filming, he filmed scenes during the daytime and wrote the script at night, resorting to amphetamine injections and wearing protective gloves because he contracted dermatitis in both hands. Overwhelmed, in February 1962, Mankiewicz rehired MacDougall to script several battle scenes (particularly those of Moongate and Actium) and the final 50 remaining pages of the second half.

On January 22, 1962, Taylor and Burton filmed their first scene together. Wanger observed in his journal: "There comes a time during the making of a movie when the actors become the characters they play... It was quiet, and you could almost feel the electricity between Liz and Burton." In February 1962, rumors of the extramarital affair were spreading, so much that Mankiewicz told Wanger in his hotel room: "I have been sitting on a volcano all alone for too long, and I want to give you some facts you ought to know. Liz and Burton are not just playing Antony and Cleopatra."

At the time, Taylor was married to her fourth husband Eddie Fisher—a relationship that also began with an affair as he was married to Debbie Reynolds at the time—and Burton was married to his first wife, Sybil Williams. By the spring, the extramarital affair became worldwide news, with the couple branded as "Liz and Dick". The Vatican City newspaper L'Osservatore Romano published an "open letter" that condemned Taylor for her "erotic vagrancy." Meanwhile, Leon Shamroy, the cinematographer, had collapsed from exhaustion and Forrest "Johnny" Johnston, the production manager, fell gravely ill and exited the production. He died in Los Angeles the following May.

On May 8 and 9, 1962, the scene of Cleopatra's procession into Rome was filmed, with the choreography staged by Hermes Pan. By late May 1962, most of the palace scenes were finished, but the remaining sequences, including those of the Battle of Pharsalus and Actium, the arrival of Cleopatra in Tarsus, and Antony's confrontation with Octavian's legions, were not yet filmed. Some of these sequences were to be shot in Egypt. Back in California, Fox had posted an annual loss for fiscal year 1961, with blame directed at the looming production costs of Cleopatra. As a result, Skouras assured shareholders that he was preparing to take "drastic measures" to reduce expenditures. On June 11, Fox cancelled the already-delayed film Something's Got to Give, which had starred Marilyn Monroe and Dean Martin.

From June 1–5, Fox executives Peter Levathes, Otto Koegel and Joseph Moskowitz, whom Wanger jokingly named as the "Three Wise Men," arrived on set to cancel the scheduled shoot of the Battle of Pharsalus. The committee informally fired Wanger by discontinuing his salary and expense account, demanded that Taylor's salary be terminated on June 9, and that all filming be halted by June 30. Mankiewicz refused to commit to the new terms, and sent a memo to then-studio chairman Samuel Rosenman requesting for Taylor's availability to be extended. In response, Rosenman permitted Taylor to work until June 23.

On June 12, Mankiewicz had read columnist Earl Wilson's report that Wanger had been fired. He asked Lewis "Doc" Merman, the studio's production manager, if he could assume Wanger's position and thereby reinstate the filming of several sequences that were cut. Taylor and Burton, angered over Wanger's dismissal, had planned to protest unless Wanger was reinstated. Back in Los Angeles, Merman consulted with Levathes, in which they both agreed that Wanger would remain as producer.

In haste, the filming unit re-located to Ischia, off the coast of Italy where the battle of Actium was shot. The scene of Cleopatra's arrival aboard her barge in Tarsus was completed on June 23, which was Taylor's last day on set. On June 26, 1962, Skouras announced his resignation as studio president, effective on September 30. On July 25, Darryl F. Zanuck was elected as the new president of Fox, while Skouras became the new chairman of the board. Zanuck then fired Levathes, replacing him with his son Richard D. Zanuck.

During the middle of July, Mankiewicz was filming on-location in Edku, located east of Alexandria. One day, while receiving his stimulant injections, one shot accidentally hit his sciatic nerve, rendering him immobile. Mankiewicz recalled, "I was in agony and had to get around by hobbling on a cane...or by wheelchair." De Cuir also remembered Mankiewicz was scribbling the last pages of the script while being carried on a stretcher. Principal photography ended on July 28, under Andrew Marton's second unit.

=== Post-production ===
Post-production work on Cleopatra had left the film's editorial team with 120 miles (630,000 ft) of exposed footage. In Los Angeles, Mankiewicz and his editor Dorothy Spencer prepared a rough cut that ran five hours and 20 minutes. On August 31, 1962, Zanuck wrote to Mankiewicz stating he wanted to see a completed first cut and a progress report no later than the first week of October. On October 13, Mankiewicz flew to Paris to screen a four-and-one-half hour rough cut for Zanuck. According to Zanuck's account, he was shocked after having seen the first cut, and asked "to see the sequences that had been cut and decided some of them should be restored, but I found to my astonishment that no loops had been made for certain eliminated episodes."

Another account stated Zanuck felt the rough cut was "beautifully written, beautifully directed, and beautifully staged", but was dissatisfied with the battle sequences. They finished the screening on Sunday morning, October 14. After the screening was over, Zanuck rejected Mankiewicz's plea to distribute Cleopatra in two separate installments, believing audiences interested in seeing Taylor and Burton together would not attend the first installment. He was further displeased with Cleopatra's dominance over Mark Antony, remarking: "If any woman behaved towards me like Cleopatra treated Antony, I would cut her balls off."

"I made the first cut, but after that, it's the studio's property. They could cut it up into banjo picks if they want."

— Mankiewicz to Newsweek

Alternately, DeCuir, who was present after the screening, stated Zanuck asked for the film to be "cut to three hours and fifteen minutes." Zanuck canceled the scheduled meeting for the next day, at which it was planned to discuss the film more in detail and departed from Paris. Meanwhile, Mankiewicz continued the dubbing sessions with Taylor and Burton.

For several days, Zanuck ignored Mankiewicz's calls for another meeting, to which Mankiewicz later learned that Zanuck had hired editor and director Elmo Williams to supervise the completion and final editing of the film. Working to insert the deleted sequences, Williams had spent three consecutive 16-hour days, removing a total of 33 minutes from the original four-hour cut. Williams explained: "When he [Mankiewicz] first saw my version, he began ranting and raving and carrying on. He had finally given up the idea of releasing the picture as two separate films, but he hadn't counted on the released version being reduced in length." According to Zanuck, Mankiewicz had grown angry and demanded the sole responsibility of editing the film. Mankiewicz, however, denied there was any direct confrontation, stating their disagreements were exchanged through letters.

On October 20, Mankiewicz sent a letter to Zanuck requesting an "honest and unequivocal statement of where I stand in relation to Cleopatra." A day later, Zanuck issued a nine-page response, blaming him for the film's excessive production costs. He further concluded: "On completion of the dubbing, your official services will be terminated ... If you are available and willing, I will call upon you to screen the re-edited version of the film." A few days later, Zanuck issued a press release stating, "In exchange for top compensation and a considerable expense account, Mr. Joseph Mankiewicz has for two years spent his time, talent, and $35,000,000 of 20th Century-Fox's shareholders' money to direct and complete the first cut of the film Cleopatra. He has earned a well-deserved rest."

Mankiewicz's dismissal from the project was harshly criticized by Taylor and Burton. Taylor responded, "What has happened to Mr. Mankiewicz is disgraceful, degrading, particularly humiliating. I am terribly upset. Mr. Mankiewicz has put two years of his life into Cleopatra, and the film is his and Mr. Wanger's. Mr. Mankiewicz took Cleopatra over when it was nothing—when it was rubbish—and he made something out of it. He certainly should have been given the chance to cut it. It is appalling." Burton separately telephoned, "I think Mr. Mankiewicz might have made the first really good epic film. Now Cleopatra may be in trouble."

On October 30, Mankiewicz flew back to his East Side townhouse where he held a press conference, insisting he had "never demanded control" nor disputed the studio's right to the final word on the finished cut. Instead, he stated he had "wanted to present the film to Fox and/or Zanuck as I saw it and be permitted to discuss with him my ideas for the picture."

After a few months of effort, Zanuck realized that because Cleopatra had no intact final shooting script, only Mankiewicz was capable of editing the final scenes together. On December 7, The New York Times reported that Mankiewicz would likely rejoin the production after having an "extremely constructive" conference with Zanuck. Both had agreed that new scenes with Harrison and Burton were needed for the film. Zanuck explained that he would "bend over backwards, artistically so that I wouldn't have to exercise [my rights as president] unless it became absolutely essential. Joe accepted that, took the scenes that I had blocked out crudely and roughly, went to work with them and wrote them." The new sequences included those meant to strengthen Antony's character so he would stand up to Cleopatra.

Mankiewicz was reinstated as director, and thereby he partially restored several deleted sequences including scenes of Sosigenes tutoring Cleopatra. In February 1963, several members of the cast, along with 1,500 extras, were called back to reshoot the Battle of Pharsalus in Almería, Spain. Mankiewicz then returned to London for eight consecutive days to reshoot new scenes with Burton at Pinewood Studios. The retakes primarily concerned Antony's scenes with his fourth wife Octavia and his companion, Rufio. On March 5, 1963, filming was finally completed.

== Alternate cuts and restoration attempts ==
Several versions of Cleopatra have reportedly existed: (Note: The runtimes are stated as: 8 and a half hour assembly workprint; 7 hour "rough edit"; 5 hour and 15 minute color workprint for Zanuck; 8 and a half hour rough cut for Zanuck; 4 hour and 6 minute New York City premiere cut; "Reduced by 20 minutes" post-release cut about 6 weeks after the premiere; 3 hour and 12 minute "neighborhood theater" cut.)

1. 8-hour assembly workprint, in black-and-white
2. 7-hour rough edit
3. 5-hour color workprint, shown to Zanuck
4. 4 1/2-hour rough cut for Zanuck.
5. 4-hour New York City premiere cut
6. 3 1/2-hour post-release cut
7. 3-hour "neighborhood theater" cut - what "many people" saw

The earliest known attempt to restore missing footage to the film was when Joseph L. Mankiewicz appeared on The Dick Cavett Show in the late 1970s. He stated he had always wanted Cleopatra to be two films, thus setting off the first recovery attempt. Each movie was expected to run under 3 hours long, for a total runtime around 5 1/2 hours. Following the death of Richard Burton, in 1984, interest was renewed in restoring the lost footage of Cleopatra. Brad Geagley, a film scholar and self-professed fan of the 1963 film, spent a considerable amount of time attempting to secure the missing footage. However, by the late 1970s, Fox had destroyed "trims" and outtakes from their studio archives from films produced before 1979 to save on costs. When Geagley discovered this decades later, he concluded "Cleopatra's elements [are] forever missing."

By the mid-1990s, before learning of the destruction, film preservationists consulted film laboratories in Los Angeles, New York, London, and Rome, along with Fox's own archives. Several reels of B-roll footage from Cleopatra were located in a salt mine in Hutchinson, Kansas, but none of the rumored missing scenes were discovered. Dorothy Spencer, the film's editor, had been "adamant" that all the deleted elements had been shipped to Hollywood and stored by Deluxe. One man recalled seeing several rooms of film elements for Cleopatra, none of which have been found.

Unnamed "collectors" are rumored by Geagley to have the 8 1/2 hour assembly cut in black-and-white. They apparently showed portions from the film, but "we don't know exactly what they have". It is not clear if Geagley has seen any missing footage himself. Fox was interested in restoring the footage, but "the path went cold." Some lost footage has since been found, which includes Cleopatra walking through the camp outside Alexandria among dozens of extras. This was intended to be Cleopatra's first scene in the film. It also includes a snake dance featured in the procession into Rome, where women dance in skimpy, snake-like costumes.

== Music ==
The music of Cleopatra was scored by Alex North. It was released several times, first as an original album, and later versions were extended. The most popular of these was the Deluxe Edition or 2001 Varèse Sarabande album.

== Release ==
Cleopatra premiered at the Rivoli Theatre in New York City on June 12, 1963, with an estimated audience of 10,000 spectators congregated outside. Among those present at the premiere were Rex Harrison, Walter Wanger, Joseph L. Mankiewicz, Darryl F. Zanuck, Jacob Javits, Richard Rodgers, Joan Fontaine, Louis Nizer and Beatrice Miller. Burton and Taylor were not in attendance; Taylor was in London and Burton was filming Becket (1964). On that night, NBC's The Tonight Show Starring Johnny Carson featured a live telecast of the film's world premiere, with Bert Parks interviewing Mankiewicz and other celebrities. Top ticket prices at the Rivoli were a record $5.50. Soon after the film's premiere, its running time was truncated from 244 to 221 minutes. Two weeks after opening in New York, the film's release was expanded into 37 cities.

According to Barbara McLean, who co-headed Fox's editing department, the studio faced pressure from theater exhibitors and reduced the run time "to three and a quarter hours and eventually, down to two and a half hours" to maximize the number of showings. According to The New York Times, the film's run time was reduced to 184 minutes for its general theatrical release in the United States. Elizabeth Taylor had attended a charity screening of the film in London and was distraught by the heavily reduced storyline, stating, "They had cut out the heart, the essence, the motivations, the very core, and tacked on all those battle scenes. It should have been about three large people, but it lacked reality and passion. I found it vulgar."

=== Home media ===
Cleopatra has been released on home video on several occasions. The film was released on videocassette by 20th Century-Fox Video in 1982. A 246-minute cut was released on LaserDisc in widescreen in 1990. A three-disc DVD edition was released in 2001. The release included numerous supplemental features, including the two-hour documentary Cleopatra: The Film That Changed Hollywood.

Schawn Belston, senior vice president of library and technical services at Fox, led a two-year process that restored a four-hour, eight-minute version in 2013. The original 65-mm camera negative was located and used as a source. Fading and damage to the negative were corrected digitally but with care to preserve detail and authenticity. Belston's team also possessed the original magnetic print masters, from which they removed clicks and hisses and created a 5.1 surround sound track.

On May 21, 2013, the restored film was shown at a special screening at the 2013 Cannes Film Festival to commemorate the film's 50th anniversary. It was later released as a 50th-anniversary version available on DVD and Blu-ray. Since Fox had long ago destroyed the negatives of the outtakes and portions of scenes that were cut during editing of the film, traditional outtakes could not be included. The home-media packages did include commentary tracks and two short films: The Cleopatra Papers and a 1963 film about the elaborate sets, The Fourth Star of Cleopatra.

== Reception ==
=== Critical response ===
Bosley Crowther of The New York Times called Cleopatra "one of the great epic films of our day," crediting Mankiewicz for "his fabrication of characters of colorfulness and depth, who stand forth as thinking, throbbing people against a background of splendid spectacle, that gives vitality to this picture and is the key to its success." Vincent Canby, reviewing for Variety, wrote that Cleopatra is "not only a supercolossal eye-filler (the unprecedented budget shows in the physical opulence throughout), but it is also a remarkably literate cinematic recreation of an historic epoch." For the Los Angeles Times, Philip K. Scheuer felt Cleopatra was "a surpassingly beautiful film and a drama that need not hide its literate, intelligent face because it happens to have been written, not by Shakespeare or Shaw, but by three fellows named Joseph L. Mankiewicz, who also directed it, Ranald MacDougall and Sidney Buchman. These are, at any rate, the names on the screen credits, and they have done their job with integrity."

Time magazine harshly wrote: "As drama and as cinema, Cleopatra is riddled with flaws. It lacks style both in image and in action. Never for an instant does it whirl along on wings of epic elan; generally it just bumps from scene to ponderous scene on the square wheels of exposition." James Powers of The Hollywood Reporter wrote "Cleopatra is not a great movie. But it is primarily a vast, popular entertainment that sidesteps total greatness for broader appeal. This is not an adverse criticism, but a notation of achievement." Claudia Cassidy of the Chicago Tribune summarized Cleopatra as a "huge and disappointing film." Of the cast, she lauded "Rex Harrison's brilliantly quizzical Caesar, the best written role in Joseph Mankiewicz's erratic script, and haunted by Richard Burton's tragic Marc Antony, an actor's triumph over a writer's mediocrity. And with a prodigal gesture of futility, all of it is focused on Elizabeth Taylor, hopelessly out of her depth as a fishwife Cleopatra."

Penelope Houston, reviewing for Sight & Sound, acknowledged that Mankiewicz tried "to make this a film about people and their emotions rather than a series of sideshows. But for this ambition to hold up, over the film's great footage, he needed a visual style which would be more than merely illustrative, dialogue really worth speaking, and actors altogether more persuasive. As the sets seem to grow bigger and bigger, so progressively the actors dwindle." Judith Crist, in her review for the New York Herald Tribune, concurred: "So grand and grandiose are the sets that the characters are dwarfed, and so wide is his screen that this concentration on character results in a strangely static epic in which the overblown close-ups are interrupted at best by a pageant or dance, more often by unexciting bits and pieces of exits, entrances, marches or battles."

At the time of the film's release, The New York Times estimated that 80 percent of film reviews in the United States were favorable but only 20 percent in Europe were positive. Among contemporary reviews, American film critic Emanuel Levy wrote retrospectively: "Much maligned for various reasons, [...] Cleopatra may be the most expensive movie ever made, but certainly not the worst, just a verbose, muddled affair that is not even entertaining as a star vehicle for Taylor and Burton." Peter Bradshaw of The Guardian wrote the film is "a stately but sometimes mindboggling spectacle. This restored big-screen version shouldn't be missed: it's a colossus of the analogue-epic era, and the high point of Elizabeth Taylor's global celebrity, when her prestige was hardly less towering than that of the actual queen of the Nile." Billy Mowbray of British television channel Film4 remarked that the film is "[a] giant of a movie that is sometimes lumbering, but ever watchable thanks to its uninhibited ambition, size and glamour."

On the review aggregator website Rotten Tomatoes, 61% of 94 critics' reviews are positive. The website's consensus reads: "Cleopatra is a lush, ostentatious, endlessly eye-popping epic that sags [and] collapses from a (and how could it not?) four-hour runtime." Metacritic, which uses a weighted average, assigned the film a score of 60 out of 100, based on 14 critics, indicating "mixed or average" reviews.

=== Box office ===
Three weeks into its theatrical release, Cleopatra became the number-one box office film in the United States, grossing $725,000 in 17 key cities. It held the top position for the next twelve weeks before being dethroned by The V.I.P.s, which also starred Elizabeth Taylor and Richard Burton. It recaptured the number-one spot three weeks later, and proved to be the highest-grossing film of 1963. By January 1964, the film had earned $15.7 million in distributor rentals from 55 theaters in the United States and Canada. It finished its box-office run with $26 million in rentals in the United States and Canada. The film was also a major hit in Italy, where it sold 10.9 million tickets. It sold a further 5.4 million tickets in France and Germany, and 32.9 million tickets in the Soviet Union when it was released there in 1978. Cleopatra was the most popular film in Polish cinemas in 1970 and by the end of that year, over 25,000 screenings had taken place in Poland, with over 5.7 million tickets sold.

By March 1966, Cleopatra had earned worldwide rentals of $38.04 million, leaving it $3 million short of breaking even. Fox eventually recouped its investment that same year when it sold the television broadcast rights to ABC for $5 million, a then-record amount paid for a single film. The film ultimately earned $40.3 million in worldwide rentals from its theatrical run.

=== Accolades ===
The film won four Academy Awards from nine nominations. It also earned Elizabeth Taylor a Guinness World Record for the most costume changes in a film (65); this record was eclipsed in 1968 by Julie Andrews with 125 costume changes in the film Star!.

20th Century-Fox mistakenly submitted Roddy McDowall to the Motion Picture Academy for consideration as Best Actor, rather than as Best Supporting Actor, for the Academy Awards. The academy deemed his role ineligible for a leading actor category and told the studio it was too late to submit him in the correct category because the nomination ballots had already been sent to the printers. 20th Century-Fox then published an open apology to McDowall in trade papers, stating, "We feel it is important that the industry realize that your electric performance as Octavian in Cleopatra, which was unanimously singled out by the critics as one of the best supporting performances by an actor this year, is not eligible for a nomination in that category... due to a regrettable error on the part of 20th Century Fox." McDowall was, however, nominated for the Golden Globe Award for Best Supporting Actor – Motion Picture.

Award	Category	Nominee	Result
1963 National Board of Review Awards	Best Actor	Rex Harrison	Won
1964 Eddie Awards	Best Edited Feature Film	Dorothy Spencer	Nominated
1964 Golden Globes	Best Motion Picture – Drama	Cleopatra	Nominated
1964 Golden Globes	Best Motion Picture Actor – Drama	Rex Harrison	Nominated
1964 Golden Globes	Best Supporting Actor – Motion Picture	Roddy McDowall	Nominated
1964 Golden Globes	Best Director – Motion Picture	Joseph L. Mankiewicz	Nominated
1964 Laurel Awards	Top Roadshow	Cleopatra	Won
1964 Laurel Awards	Top Male Dramatic Performance	Rex Harrison	Nominated
1964 Laurel Awards	Top Female Star	Elizabeth Taylor	Nominated
1964 Academy Awards	Best Picture	Walter Wanger	Nominated
1964 Academy Awards	Best Actor in a Leading Role	Rex Harrison	Nominated
1964 Academy Awards	Best Art Direction – Set Decoration, Color	Art Direction: John DeCuir, Jack Martin Smith, Hilyard M. Brown, Herman A. Blumenthal, Elven Webb, Maurice Pelling, and Boris Juraga; Set Decoration: Walter M. Scott, Paul S. Fox, and Ray Moyer	Won
1964 Academy Awards	Best Cinematography, Color	Leon Shamroy	Won
1964 Academy Awards	Best Costume Design, Color	Irene Sharaff, Vittorio Nino Novarese, and Renié	Won
1964 Academy Awards	Best Film Editing	Dorothy Spencer	Nominated
1964 Academy Awards	Best Music Score – Substantially Original	Alex North	Nominated
1964 Academy Awards	Best Sound	James Corcoran (Twentieth Century Fox Sound Department) and Fred Hynes (Todd-AO Sound Department)	Nominated
1964 Academy Awards	Best Special Effects	Emil Kosa Jr.	Won
1964 Grammy Awards	Background Score from a Motion Picture or Television	Alex North	Nominated
2014 Golden Trailer Awards	Most Innovative Advertising for a Brand/Product	Cleopatra / Bulgari	Nominated

== See also ==
- List of American films of 1963
- List of cultural depictions of Cleopatra
- Roman Republic
- Ancient Egypt
- Ptolemaic dynasty
- Sword-and-sandal
- Lists of historical films
- List of films set in ancient Rome
- Asterix and Cleopatra

== Bibliography ==
- Amburn, Ellis (2000). The Most Beautiful Woman in the World: The Obsessions, Passions, and Courage of Elizabeth Taylor. HarperCollins. ISBN 0-06-019376-X.
- Bernstein, Matthew (2000) [1994]. Walter Wanger, Hollywood Independent. University of Minnesota Press. ISBN 978-0-816-63548-1.
- Brodsky, Jack; Weiss, Nathan (1963). The Cleopatra Papers: A Private Correspondence. New York: Simon & Schuster. OCLC 219877884.
- Cashmore, Ellis (2016). Elizabeth Taylor: A Private Life for Public Consumption. Bloomsbury Publishing. ISBN 978-1-628-92067-3.
- Chrissochoidis, Ilias, ed. (2013). The Cleopatra Files: Selected Documents from the Spyros P. Skouras Archive. Stanford: Brave World. ISBN 978-0-615-82919-7.
- Gachman, Dina (2010). "Cleopatra". In Block, Alex Ben; Wilson, Lucy Autrey (eds.). George Lucas's Blockbusting: A Decade-by-Decade Survey of Timeless Movies Including Untold Secrets of Their Financial and Cultural Success. HarperCollins. ISBN 978-0-061-77889-6.
- Geist, Kenneth L. (1978). Pictures Will Talk: The Life and Films of Joseph L. Mankiewicz. New York: Charles Scribner's Books. ISBN 0-684-15500-1.
- Heymann, C. David (1995). Liz: An Intimate Biography of Elizabeth Taylor. New York: Birch Lane Press. ISBN 1-55972-267-3.
- Humphries, Patrick (2023). Cleopatra and the Undoing of Hollywood: How One Film Almost Sunk the Studios. The History Press. ISBN 978-1-803-99396-6.
- Kamp, David (April 1998). "When Liz Met Dick". Vanity Fair. pp. 366–393.
- Lev, Peter (2013). Twentieth Century-Fox: The Zanuck-Skouras Years, 1935–1965. Austin: University of Texas Press. ISBN 978-0-292-74447-9.
- Luhrssen, David (2013). Mamoulian: Life on Stage and Screen. University of Kentucky. ISBN 978-0-813-13676-9.
- Mankiewicz, Tom; Crane, Robert (2012). My Life as a Mankiewicz: An Insider's Journey through Hollywood. University Press of Kentucky. ISBN 978-0-8131-6123-5.
- Milne, Tom (1970). Rouben Mamoulian. Bloomington: Indiana University Press. ISBN 978-0-253-15015-8.
- Mosley, Leonard (1984). Zanuck: The Rise and Fall of Hollywood's Last Tycoon. Toronto: Little, Brown and Company. ISBN 0-316-58538-6.
- Parish, James Robert (2007). "Cleopatra (1963)". Fiasco: A History of Hollywood's Iconic Flops. Wiley. pp. 15–39. ISBN 978-0-470-09829-5.
- Sheppard, Dick (1974). Elizabeth: The Life and Career of Elizabeth Taylor. Garden City: Doubleday. ISBN 978-0-385-07348-6.
- Stern, Sydney Ladensohn (2019). The Brothers Mankiewicz: Hope, Heartbreak, and Hollywood Classics. Jackson: University Press of Mississippi. ISBN 978-1-617-03267-7.
- Taraborrelli, J. Randy (2006). Elizabeth. Warner Books. ISBN 978-0-446-53254-9.
- Wanger, Walter; Hyams, Joe (2013) [1963]. My Life with Cleopatra: The Making of a Hollywood Classic. New York: Vintage Books. ISBN 978-0-345-80405-1.
