= To Live Again (film) =

1963 film

- Produced by: Mel London
- Production company: Wilding
- Distributed by: St Barnabas Hospital
- Release date: 1963
- Country: United States
- Language: English

To Live Again is a 1963 short documentary film produced by Mel London. It was nominated for an Academy Award for Best Documentary Short.

== See also ==
- List of American films of 1963
