= Chagall (film) =

1963 film

- Directed by: Lauro Venturi
- Written by: Leonard Neubauer
- Produced by: Simon Schiffrin
- Narrated by: Vincent Price
- Cinematography: Jean Bourgoin
- Release date: 1963
- Country: France
- Languages: French; English

Chagall is a 1963 short documentary film directed by Lauro Venturi which focuses on the work of artist Marc Chagall. It won an Oscar at the 36th Academy Awards in 1964 for Documentary Short Subject. The Academy Film Archive preserved Chagall in 2008.

== Cast ==
- Vincent Price as narrator (voice)
- Marc Chagall as himself
