= A New Kind of Love =

1963 film by Melville Shavelson

- Theatrical release poster
- Directed by: Melville Shavelson
- Written by: Melville Shavelson
- Produced by: Melville Shavelson
- Starring: Paul Newman; Joanne Woodward; Thelma Ritter; Eva Gabor; Maurice Chevalier
- Cinematography: Daniel L. Fapp
- Edited by: Frank Bracht
- Music by: Erroll Garner; Leith Stevens
- Production company: Llenroc Productions
- Distributed by: Paramount Pictures
- Release dates: October 10, 1963 (United Kingdom); October 30, 1963 (United States)
- Running time: 110 minutes
- Country: United States
- Languages: English; French
- Box office: $2.2 million (US and Canada rentals)

A New Kind of Love is a 1963 American romantic comedy film written, directed, and produced by Melville Shavelson and starring Paul Newman and Joanne Woodward. Frank Sinatra sings "You Brought a New Kind of Love to Me" over the opening credits.

== Plot ==
Steve Sherman, a womanizing American newspaper columnist, is exiled to Paris after unwittingly sleeping with his publisher's wife. On the plane, Steve meets Samantha "Sam" Blake, whom he mistakes for a man due to her tomboy appearance, and the two instantly dislike each other. A career woman, Sam works as a designer for a manufacturer of knock-off women’s clothing in New York City, copying designs from high-end fashion houses to be recreated and sold for a fraction of the cost. Accompanied by her boss Joseph "Joe" Bergner and colleague Lena O'Connor, Sam travels to Paris in order to scour couture houses and fashion shows for inspiration.

During the St. Catherine's Day celebration, where young unmarried women pray for husbands, an intoxicated Sam has a vision in which St. Catherine advises her on how to attract a potential husband. Following a complete makeover at a beauty salon, Sam emerges donning a blonde wig, red lipstick, and glamorous clothes. Meanwhile, Lena, who is secretively in love with Joe, forlornly watches him become romantically involved with Felicienne Courbeau, the store's French agent.

Steve runs into Sam at a café, but fails to recognize her, mistaking her for a high-class prostitute. Sam plays along with the charade, as a means of revenge for the way he treated her on the plane, and adopts the alias Mimi. Steve interviews Sam as she feeds him fabricated tales involving sexual dalliances with some of Europe's most powerful men. He then publishes her scandalous tales in his new column, which proves an instant success. As the two spend more time together, they begin to develop feelings for each other.

When Felicienne's sordid past resurfaces in Steve's column (after Sam appropriated one of Felicienne's tales and relayed it to Steve), Joe ends their engagement—which later brings him and Lena closer together. Running into a desolate Joe, Steve introduces him to "Mimi" in order to cheer him up, unaware that Joe is her boss. Although humiliated, Sam admits to Lena and Joe that she loves Steve. At Lena's suggestion, Sam convinces Steve that she wants to change her life by leaving prostitution. Steve takes Sam to see a priest in order to save her, but she runs away screaming.

While observing a photograph of "Mimi", Steve finally realizes she is actually Sam. Despite feeling betrayed, Steve confesses to Lena that he is in love with Sam. Determined to expose Sam's ruse, Steve invites her to his apartment, pretending to offer her money to spend the night with him before he leaves Paris the next day. When Sam leans in to kiss Steve, he pulls her wig off and reveals he already knew the truth. Sam sobbingly insists she did not plan to accept his money and apologizes for deceiving him. Steve forgives her, and the two kiss while professing their love for each other. He then pulls out the money he originally planned to give to Sam and declares he will now be her sales manager, angering her. In a fantasy sequence, Steve, wearing a football uniform, chases down Sam in a wedding dress and carries her to a nuptial bed.

== Cast ==
- Paul Newman as Steve Sherman
- Joanne Woodward as Samantha "Sam" Blake / Mimi
- Thelma Ritter as Lena O'Connor
- Eva Gabor as Felicienne Courbeau
- George Tobias as Joseph "Joe" Bergner
- Marvin Kaplan as Harry Gorman
- Robert Clary as Frenchman at restaurant
- Jan Moriarty as Suzanne
- Joan Staley as Danish stewardess
- Robert F. Simon as Bertram Chalmers
- Maurice Chevalier as himself
- Valerie Varda as Mrs. Chalmers (uncredited)
- Army Archerd as Onlooker (uncredited)

== Reception ==
The film received mixed reviews. On the review aggregator website Rotten Tomatoes, A New Kind of Love holds an approval rating of 13% based on eight reviews, with an average rating of 3.7/10.

== Accolades ==
Award	Year	Category	Recipient(s)	Result
Academy Awards	1964	Best Costume Design, Color	Edith Head	Nominated
Academy Awards	1964	Best Scoring of Music – Adaptation or Treatment	Leith Stevens	Nominated
Golden Globe Awards	1964	Best Actress in a Motion Picture – Musical or Comedy	Joanne Woodward	Nominated
Laurel Awards	1964	Top Female Supporting Performance	Thelma Ritter	3rd place

== Novelization ==
Before the release of the film, Dell issued a paperback novelization of the screenplay by mainstream author W.H. (William Henry, a.k.a. Bill) Manville (1926–2017) as Henry Williams, the pseudonym he used for tie-in work. The screenplay is not directly attributed as the source, but it is cited in a back cover film credit list, and the copyright is assigned to Paramount Pictures. The cover illustration features Newman and Woodward in the "falling-kiss" pose of the film poster, and the middle of the book contains a four-page insert of captioned, black-and-white production stills.

== See also ==
- List of American films of 1963
