= That's Me (film) =

- Directed by: Walker Stuart
- Written by: Alan Arkin; Andrew Duncan
- Starring: Alan Arkin; Andrew Duncan
- Production companies: Pathé Contemporary Films; Stuart Productions
- Distributed by: Pathé Contemporary Films
- Release date: 1963
- Running time: 15 minutes
- Country: United States
- Language: English

That's Me is a 1963 American short comedy film directed by Walker Stuart. It's written by and stars Alan Arkin and Andrew Duncan. The plot follows a young Puerto Rican guitar player trying to establish himself in New York City.

It received a nomination for the Academy Award for Best Live Action Short Film.
