= Ray Moyer =

American set decorator

- Born: February 21, 1898; Santa Barbara, California, U.S.
- Died: February 6, 1986 (aged 87); Los Angeles, California, U.S.
- Occupation: Set decorator
- Years active: 1927–1973

Ray Moyer (February 21, 1898 – February 6, 1986) was an American set decorator. He won three Academy Awards and was nominated for nine more in the category Best Art Direction. He was born in Santa Barbara, California and died in Los Angeles, California.

== Selected filmography ==
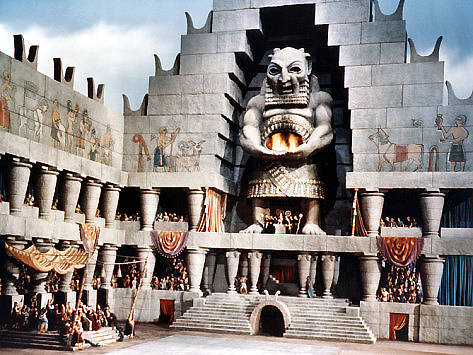
A set constructed to represent the temple of Dagon for the film Samson and Delilah (1949).

Moyer won three Academy Awards for Best Art Direction and was nominated for nine more:

Won

- Samson and Delilah (1949)
- Sunset Boulevard (1950)
- Cleopatra (1963)

Nominated

- Lady in the Dark (1944)
- Love Letters (1945)
- Kitty (1945)
- Red Garters (1954)
- Sabrina (1954)
- The Ten Commandments (1956)
- Funny Face (1957)
- Breakfast at Tiffany's (1961)
- The Greatest Story Ever Told (1965)
