= Boris Juraga =

Italian art director

- Occupation: Art director
- Years active: 1959-1980

Boris Juraga was an Italian art director. He won an Academy Award in the category Best Art Direction for the film Cleopatra.

== Selected filmography ==
- Cleopatra (1963)
