= Hilyard M. Brown =

American art director

- Born: February 16, 1910; Nebraska, United States
- Died: October 12, 2002 (aged 92)
- Other name: Hilyard Brown
- Occupation: Art director
- Years active: 1934 - 1986

Hilyard M. Brown (February 16, 1910 – October 12, 2002) was an American art director. He won an Oscar in the category Best Art Direction for the film Cleopatra.

== Selected filmography ==
- Creature from the Black Lagoon (1954)
- The Night of the Hunter (1955)
- Cleopatra (1963)

== See also ==
- Art Directors Guild Hall of Fame
