= Maurice Pelling =

British art director

- Born: 1920; Romford, Essex, England
- Died: 7 June 1973 (aged 52–53); Denia, Spain
- Occupation: Art director
- Years active: 1945-1973

Maurice Pelling (1920–1973) was a British art director. He won an Academy Award in the category Best Art Direction for the film Cleopatra.

== Selected filmography ==
- Cleopatra (1963)
