= List of American films of 1963 =

American films released in 1963

More than 188 American films were released in 1963.

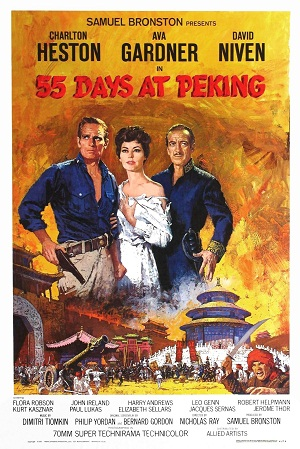
55 Days at Peking starring Charlton Heston and Ava Gardner.

Cleopatra - the highest-grossing film of 1963.

== A-C ==
Title	Director	Cast	Genre	Note
13 Frightened Girls	William Castle	Murray Hamilton, Joyce Taylor	Thriller	Columbia
4 for Texas	Robert Aldrich	Frank Sinatra, Dean Martin, Anita Ekberg, Ursula Andress, Charles Bronson	Comedy	Warner Bros.
55 Days at Peking	Nicholas Ray	Charlton Heston, Ava Gardner, David Niven	Drama	Allied Artists
Act One	Dore Schary	George Hamilton, Jason Robards, Jack Klugman, George Segal	Biography	Warner Bros.
All the Way Home	Alex Segal	Jean Simmons, Robert Preston, Pat Hingle	Drama	Drama James Agee book
America America	Elia Kazan	Frank Wolff, Stathis Giallelis, Lou Antonio, Joanna Frank	Drama	Warner Bros.
Atom Age Vampire	A.G. Majano	Alberto Lupo, Susanne Loret, Sergio Fantoni	Horror	
The Balcony	Joseph Strick	Shelley Winters, Peter Falk, Leonard Nimoy, Ruby Dee	Drama	play by Jean Genet
Beach Party	William Asher	Robert Cummings, Dorothy Malone, Annette Funicello, Frankie Avalon	Comedy	AIP
The Birds	Alfred Hitchcock	Tippi Hedren, Rod Taylor, Jessica Tandy, Suzanne Pleshette, Veronica Cartwright	Suspense	Universal
Black Zoo	Robert Gordon	Michael Gough, Jeanne Cooper, Rod Lauren	Horror	Allied Artists
Blonde Cobra	Ken Jacobs	Jack Smith	Short	
Blood Feast	H.G. Lewis	William Kerwin, Mal Arnold, Connie Mason, Scott H. Hall	Horror	
Bye Bye Birdie	George Sidney	Dick Van Dyke, Ann-Margret, Janet Leigh, Bobby Rydell, Maureen Stapleton	Musical	Columbia. Based on the play
Cairo	Wolf Rilla	George Sanders, Richard Johnson	Crime	MGM
California	Hamil Petroff	Jock Mahoney, Faith Domergue	Western	AIP; Remake of 1947 film
Call Me Bwana	Gordon Douglas	Bob Hope, Anita Ekberg, Edie Adams	Comedy	United Artists
Captain Newman, M.D.	David Miller	Gregory Peck, Angie Dickinson, Tony Curtis, Eddie Albert, Robert Duvall, Larry Storch, Bobby Darin	Drama	Universal. 3 Oscar nominations
Captain Sindbad	Byron Haskin	Guy Williams, Heidi Brühl, Pedro Armendáriz	Adventure	MGM; Co-production with West Germany
The Cardinal	Otto Preminger	Tom Tryon, John Huston, Carol Lynley, Romy Schneider, Ossie Davis	Drama	Columbia. 6 Oscar nominations
The Caretakers	Hall Bartlett	Joan Crawford, Robert Stack, Polly Bergen	Suspense	U.A.
Cattle King	Tay Garnett	Robert Taylor, Joan Caulfield	Western	MGM
The Ceremony	Laurence Harvey	Laurence Harvey, Sarah Miles	Crime	United Artists
Charade	Stanley Donen	Audrey Hepburn, Cary Grant, Walter Matthau, James Coburn, Ned Glass, George Kennedy	Suspense	Universal
A Child Is Waiting	John Cassavetes	Burt Lancaster, Judy Garland, Gena Rowlands	Drama	United Artists
Cleopatra	Joseph Mankiewicz	Elizabeth Taylor, Richard Burton, Rex Harrison, Roddy McDowall, Martin Landau, Carroll O'Connor, Hume Cronyn	Epic	Fox; won 4 Oscars; Remake of 1934 film
Come Blow Your Horn	Bud Yorkin	Frank Sinatra, Tony Bill, Barbara Rush, Jill St. John	Comedy	Paramount. Script by Neil Simon
Come Fly with Me	Henry Levin	Dolores Hart, Pamela Tiffin, Lois Nettleton, Hugh O'Brian	Romance	MGM
The Comedy of Terrors	Jacques Tourneur	Vincent Price, Peter Lorre, Boris Karloff, Basil Rathbone	Horror	American International
The Cool World	Shirley Clarke	Yolanda Rodríguez, Antonio Fargas, Carl Lee	Drama	
The Courtship of Eddie's Father	Vincente Minnelli	Glenn Ford, Shirley Jones, Stella Stevens, Dina Merrill, Ron Howard, Jerry Van Dyke	Comedy	MGM. Inspired TV series
The Crawling Hand	Herbert L. Strock	Peter Breck, Kent Taylor, Alan Hale Jr.	Horror	
Critic's Choice	Don Weis	Bob Hope, Lucille Ball, Marilyn Maxwell, Rip Torn	Comedy	Warner Bros.
Cry of Battle	Irving Lerner	Van Heflin, Rita Moreno	War	Allied Artists

== D-G ==
Title	Director	Cast	Genre	Note
The Day Mars Invaded Earth	Maury Dexter	Kent Taylor, Marie Windsor	Science fiction	20th Century Fox
Dementia 13	Francis Ford Coppola	William Campbell, Patrick Magee	Thriller	A.I.P.
Diamond Head	Guy Green	Charlton Heston, Yvette Mimieux	Drama	Columbia; based on Peter Gilman novel
Diary of a Madman	Reginald LeBorg	Vincent Price, Nancy Kovack, Lewis Martin	Horror	United Artists
Dime with a Halo	Boris Sagal	Barbara Luna, Roger Mobley	Comedy	MGM
Donovan's Reef	John Ford	John Wayne, Lee Marvin, Jack Warden, Dorothy Lamour, Elizabeth Allen, Cesar Romero	Comedy	Paramount; final Ford-Wayne collaboration
Drums of Africa	James B. Clark	Frankie Avalon, Mariette Hartley	Adventure	MGM
Eat	Andy Warhol	Robert Indiana		
Face in the Rain	Irvin Kershner	Rory Calhoun, Marina Berti	Drama	Embassy
Five Minutes to Love	John Hayes	Rue McClanahan	Drama	Headliner Productions
Flaming Creatures	Jack Smith	Frances Francine, Mario Montez	Experimental	
Flipper	James B. Clark	Chuck Connors, Luke Halpin	Family	MGM. Based on the TV series
Follow the Boys	Richard Thorpe	Connie Francis, Janis Paige, Paula Prentiss, Russ Tamblyn	Comedy Romance	MGM
For Love or Money	Michael Gordon	Kirk Douglas, Mitzi Gaynor, Thelma Ritter, Gig Young, Leslie Parrish, Julie Newmar	Comedy Romance	Universal
Free, White and 21	Larry Buchanan	Frederick O'Neal, Annalena Lund	Drama	AIP
From Russia with Love	Terence Young	Sean Connery, Daniela Bianchi, Lotte Lenya	Spy	United Artists
Fun in Acapulco	Richard Thorpe	Elvis Presley, Ursula Andress, Elsa Cárdenas, Alejandro Rey	Musical	Paramount
A Gathering of Eagles	Delbert Mann	Rock Hudson, Rod Taylor, Barry Sullivan	Drama	Universal
Gidget Goes to Rome	Paul Wendkos	Cindy Carol, Don Porter	Comedy	Columbia. Gidget sequel
The Girl Hunters	Roy Rowland	Mickey Spillane, Shirley Eaton	Mystery	from Spillane's novel
Goldilocks and the Three Bares	Herschell Gordon Lewis	Alison Edwards, Rex Marlow, Thomas Sweetwood, Joey Maxim	Erotic Comedy	
The Great Escape	John Sturges	Steve McQueen, James Garner, Richard Attenborough, Charles Bronson, James Coburn, James Donald, Donald Pleasence, David McCallum	War	United Artists; based on book by Paul Brickhill
Gunfight at Comanche Creek	Frank McDonald	Audie Murphy, Colleen Miller	Western	Allied Artists
The Gun Hawk	Edward Ludwig	Rory Calhoun, Rod Cameron, Ruta Lee	Western	Allied Artists

== H-M ==
Title	Director	Cast	Genre	Note
Harbor Lights	Maury Dexter	Kent Taylor, Míriam Colón, Jeff Morrow	Action	20th Century Fox
The Haunted Palace	Roger Corman	Vincent Price, Debra Paget	Horror	AIP. Paget's final film
The Haunting	Robert Wise	Julie Harris, Claire Bloom, Russ Tamblyn	Horror	MGM. From Shirley Jackson novel
The Hook	George Seaton	Kirk Douglas, Nick Adams	War	MGM
Hootenanny Hoot	Gene Nelson	Peter Breck, Ruta Lee, Johnny Cash	Musical	MGM
House of the Damned	Maury Dexter	Ron Foster, Merry Anders, Richard Crane	Thriller	20th Century Fox
Hud	Martin Ritt	Paul Newman, Melvyn Douglas, Patricia Neal, Brandon deWilde	Drama	Paramount. From Larry McMurtry novel; Oscars for Douglas, Neal
I Could Go On Singing	Ronald Neame	Judy Garland, Dirk Bogarde	Drama	United Artists. Garland's final film
In the Cool of the Day	Robert Stevens	Peter Finch, Jane Fonda, Angela Lansbury	Drama	MGM
In the French Style	Robert Parrish	Jean Seberg, Stanley Baker, Philippe Forquet	Romance	Columbia
The Incredible Journey	Fletcher Markle	Émile Genest, John Drainie	Family	
Irma la Douce	Billy Wilder	Jack Lemmon, Shirley MacLaine	Comedy	United Artists. 3 Oscar nominations and 1 win.
Island of Love	Morton DaCosta	Robert Preston, Tony Randall, Walter Matthau	Comedy	Warner Bros.
It Happened at the World's Fair	Norman Taurog	Elvis Presley, Joan O'Brien, Gary Lockwood, Vicky Tiu, Yvonne Craig, Kam Tong, Kurt Russell	Musical	MGM
It's a Mad, Mad, Mad, Mad World	Stanley Kramer	Spencer Tracy, Milton Berle, Mickey Rooney, Ethel Merman, Sid Caesar, Phil Silvers	Comedy	United Artists. 6 Academy Award nominations with 1 win; top-grossing film of 1963
Jason and the Argonauts	Don Chaffey	Todd Armstrong, Nancy Kovack, Honor Blackman	Fantasy	Columbia
Johnny Cool	William Asher	Henry Silva, Elizabeth Montgomery, Jim Backus	Crime	United Artists
Kings of the Sun	J. Lee Thompson	Yul Brynner, George Chakiris	Adventure	United Artists
Ladybug Ladybug	Frank Perry	Jane Connell, William Daniels, Nancy Marchand	Drama	United Artists
Lilies of the Field	Ralph Nelson	Sidney Poitier, Lilia Skala	Drama	United Artists. Oscar for Poitier
The List of Adrian Messenger	John Huston	George C. Scott, Dana Wynter	Mystery	Universal. Many cameos
The Long Ships	Jack Cardiff	Richard Widmark, Sidney Poitier, Russ Tamblyn	Adventure	Columbia
Love Is a Ball	David Swift	Glenn Ford, Hope Lange, Telly Savalas	Comedy	United Artists
Love with the Proper Stranger	Robert Mulligan	Natalie Wood, Steve McQueen, Edie Adams	Drama	Paramount. 5 Oscar nominations
The Man from the Diners' Club	Frank Tashlin	Danny Kaye, Martha Hyer, Telly Savalas	Comedy	Columbia
Maniac	Michael Carreras	Kerwin Mathews, Nadia Gray, Donald Houston	Horror	
Mary, Mary	Mervyn LeRoy	Debbie Reynolds, Barry Nelson, Michael Rennie	Comedy	Warner Bros. From Jean Kerr play
McLintock!	Andrew V. McLaglen	John Wayne, Maureen O'Hara, Stefanie Powers, Yvonne De Carlo	Western	United Artists
Miracle of the White Stallions	Arthur Hiller	Robert Taylor, Lilli Palmer, Curd Jürgens	War drama	Disney
Move Over, Darling	Michael Gordon	Doris Day, James Garner, Polly Bergen	Comedy	20th Century Fox. My Favorite Wife remake
My Six Loves	Gower Champion	Debbie Reynolds, Cliff Robertson, David Janssen	Comedy	Paramount

== N-S ==
Title	Director	Cast	Genre	Note
A New Kind of Love	Melville Shavelson	Paul Newman, Joanne Woodward, Eva Gabor	Comedy	Paramount
Nine Hours to Rama	Mark Robson	Horst Buchholz, José Ferrer, Diane Baker	Drama	20th Century Fox. From Stanley Wolpert book
The Nutty Professor	Jerry Lewis	Jerry Lewis, Stella Stevens	Comedy	Paramount; Remade in 1996
Of Love and Desire	Richard Rush	Merle Oberon, Steve Cochran	Drama	20th Century Fox
The Old Dark House	William Castle	Tom Poston, Joyce Grenfell, Janette Scott	Horror	Columbia; remake of 1932 film
One Man's Way	Denis Sanders	Don Murray, Diana Hyland, Carol Ohmart, William Windom, Veronica Cartwright, Virginia Sale	Biography	story of Norman Vincent Peale
Operation Bikini	Anthony Carras	Tab Hunter, Frankie Avalon, Jim Backus, Gary Crosby	War Drama	AIP
PT 109	Leslie H. Martinson	Cliff Robertson, Robert Culp, Robert Blake	War	Warner Bros.; story of John F. Kennedy
Palm Springs Weekend	Norman Taurog	Troy Donahue, Stefanie Powers, Connie Stevens	Comedy	Warner Bros.
Papa's Delicate Condition	George Marshall	Jackie Gleason, Glynis Johns, Charlie Ruggles	Comedy	Paramount. Oscar for Best Song
The Pink Panther	Blake Edwards	David Niven, Peter Sellers, Robert Wagner, Capucine, Claudia Cardinale	Comedy	United Artists. First of a series
Police Nurse	Maury Dexter	Ken Scott, Merry Anders	Crime	20th Century Fox
The Prize	Mark Robson	Paul Newman, Edward G. Robinson, Elke Sommer, Kevin McCarthy, Diane Baker	Drama	MGM. From Irving Wallace novel
Promises! Promises!	King Donovan	Jayne Mansfield, Tommy Noonan	Comedy	First feature with nudity by a star actress
The Quick and the Dead	Robert Totten	Victor French, Majel Barrett	War	Independent
The Raiders	Herschel Daugherty	Brian Keith, Robert Culp	Western	Universal; Remake of 1952 film
Rampage	Phil Karlson	Robert Mitchum, Jack Hawkins, Elsa Martinelli	Adventure	Seven Arts
The Raven	Roger Corman	Vincent Price, Boris Karloff, Peter Lorre	Horror	AIP. Edgar Allan Poe story
The Running Man	Carol Reed	Lawrence Harvey, Lee Remick, Alan Bates	Drama	Columbia Pictures; Remade in 1987
The Sadist	James Landis	Arch Hall Jr.	Science fiction	Fairway International Pictures
Savage Sam	Norman Tokar	Brian Keith, Tommy Kirk	Western	Disney
Shock Corridor	Samuel Fuller	Peter Breck, Constance Towers	Drama	Allied Artists
Showdown	R. G. Springsteen	Audie Murphy, Kathleen Crowley	Western	Universal
The Skydivers	Coleman Francis	Anthony Cardoza, Jimmy Bryant	Drama	Crown International Pictures
The Slime People	Robert Hutton	Robert Hutton, Susan Hart	Horror	Donald J. Hansen Enterprises
Soldier in the Rain	Ralph Nelson	Jackie Gleason, Steve McQueen, Tuesday Weld	Comedy	Allied Artists. From William Goldman novel
Son of Flubber	Robert Stevenson	Fred MacMurray, Nancy Olson, Tommy Kirk, William Demarest, Keenan Wynn, Ed Wynn, Paul Lynde, Leon Ames, Elliott Reid, Edward Andrews	Comedy	Disney. The Absent-Minded Professor sequel
Spencer's Mountain	Delmer Daves	Henry Fonda, Maureen O'Hara	Family	Warner Bros. From Earl Hamner Jr. novel
Stolen Hours	Daniel Petrie	Susan Hayward, Diane Baker	Drama	United Artists. Dark Victory remake
The Stripper	Franklin J. Schaffner	Joanne Woodward, Richard Beymer, Claire Trevor	Drama	20th Century Fox
Summer Magic	James Neilson	Hayley Mills, Burl Ives	Musical comedy	Disney
Sunday in New York	Peter Tewksbury	Jane Fonda, Rod Taylor, Cliff Robertson, Robert Culp	Comedy	MGM; from Norman Krasna play
The Sword in the Stone	Wolfgang Reitherman	voices of Sebastian Cabot, Karl Swenson	Animated	Disney

== T-Z ==
Title	Director	Cast	Genre	Note
Take Her, She's Mine	Henry Koster	James Stewart, Sandra Dee, Audrey Meadows	Comedy	Fox; based on Phoebe and Henry Ephron play
Tammy and the Doctor	Harry Keller	Sandra Dee, Peter Fonda	Romance	Universal. Third of series
Tarzan's Three Challenges	Robert Day	Jock Mahoney, Woody Strode	Adventure	MGM. Edgar Rice Burroughs character
Terrified	Lew Landers	Rod Lauren, Barbara Luddy	Horror	Crown International Pictures
The Terror	5 directors	Boris Karloff, Jack Nicholson	Horror	AIP
They Saved Hitler's Brain	David Bradley	Walter Stocker, Carlos Rivas	Science Fiction	
The Three Lives of Thomasina	Don Chaffey	Patrick McGoohan, Susan Hampshire, Karen Dotrice, Matthew Garber	Fantasy	Disney
The Three Stooges Go Around the World in a Daze	Norman Maurer	The Three Stooges, Joan Freeman	Comedy	Columbia
The Thrill of It All	Norman Jewison	Doris Day, James Garner	Comedy	Universal. Script by Carl Reiner
Thunder Island	Jack Leewood	Gene Nelson, Fay Spain	Drama	20th Century Fox. Script co-written by Jack Nicholson
A Ticklish Affair	George Sidney	Shirley Jones, Gig Young, Red Buttons	Comedy	MGM
Toys in the Attic	George Roy Hill	Dean Martin, Geraldine Page, Yvette Mimieux, Wendy Hiller, Gene Tierney	Drama	United Artists; based on Lillian Hellman play
Twice-Told Tales	Sidney Salkow	Vincent Price, Sebastian Cabot, Beverly Garland	Horror	United Artists
Twilight of Honor	Boris Sagal	Richard Chamberlain, Nick Adams, Joey Heatherton, Joan Blackman, Claude Rains	Drama	MGM
The Ugly American	George Englund	Marlon Brando, Sandra Church, Eiji Okada, Jocelyn Brando,	Drama	Universal
Under the Yum Yum Tree	David Swift	Jack Lemmon, Carol Lynley, Dean Jones, Edie Adams	Comedy	Columbia
The V.I.P.s	Anthony Asquith	Elizabeth Taylor, Richard Burton, Rod Taylor, Maggie Smith	Drama	MGM; from Terence Rattigan play; Oscar for Rutherford
The Victors	Carl Foreman	George Peppard, George Hamilton, Vince Edwards, Romy Schneider	War	Columbia; from Alexander Baron story
Wall of Noise	Richard Wilson	Suzanne Pleshette, Dorothy Provine	Drama	Warner Bros.
The Wheeler Dealers	Arthur Hiller	James Garner, Lee Remick, Chill Wills, Jim Backus, Pat Crowley	Comedy	MGM
Who's Been Sleeping in My Bed?	Daniel Mann	Dean Martin, Elizabeth Montgomery, Carol Burnett, Richard Conte	Comedy	Paramount
Who's Minding the Store?	Frank Tashlin	Jerry Lewis, Jill St. John, Agnes Moorehead, Ray Walston, Kathleen Freeman	Comedy	Paramount
Wives and Lovers	John Rich	Janet Leigh, Van Johnson	Romance	Paramount
X: The Man with the X-ray Eyes	Roger Corman	Ray Milland, Diana Van der Vlis, Don Rickles	Science Fiction	AIP; aka Man with the X-Ray Eyes
The Yellow Canary	Buzz Kulik	Pat Boone, Barbara Eden, Steve Forrest	Crime	20th Century Fox. Script by Rod Serling
The Young and the Brave	Francis D. Lyon	Rory Calhoun, William Bendix	War	MGM
The Young Racers	Roger Corman	Mark Damon, Luana Anders, Patrick Magee	Sports	AIP
The Young Swingers	Maury Dexter	Molly Bee, Rod Lauren	Musical	20th Century Fox

== See also ==
- List of 1963 box office number-one films in the United States
- AFI Catalog of Feature Films
- 1963 in the United States
