= The Balcony (film) =

1963 film by Joseph Strick

- Cover art for 2000 DVD release
- Directed by: Joseph Strick
- Written by: Jean Genet; Ben Maddow
- Produced by: Ben Maddow; Joseph Strick
- Starring: Shelley Winters; Peter Falk; Leonard Nimoy; Ruby Dee; Lee Grant
- Cinematography: George J. Folsey
- Edited by: Chester W. Schaeffer
- Distributed by: Continental Distributing
- Release date: March 21, 1963
- Running time: 84 minutes
- Country: United States
- Language: English
- Budget: $165,000
- Box office: $1,200,000 (US/Canada)

The Balcony is a 1963 film adaptation of Jean Genet's 1957 play The Balcony, directed by Joseph Strick. It stars Shelley Winters, Peter Falk, Lee Grant and Leonard Nimoy. George J. Folsey was nominated for an Academy Award for Best Cinematography. Ben Maddow was nominated for a Writers Guild of America Award. The film also credits the photographer Helen Levitt as an assistant director and Verna Fields as the sound editor.

== Plot ==
Shelley Winters plays the madam of a brothel where customers play out their erotic fantasies, oblivious to a revolution that is sweeping the country. When her old friend, the chief of police (Peter Falk), asks her to impersonate the missing queen in order to reassure the people and halt the revolution, she offers instead that three of her customers play the general, bishop and chief justice, all of whom have died in the revolution.

== Cast ==
- Shelley Winters - Madame Irma
- Peter Falk - Police Chief
- Lee Grant - Carmen
- Peter Brocco - Judge
- Jeff Corey - Bishop
- Ruby Dee - Thief
- Joyce Jameson - Penitent
- Arnette Jens - Horse
- Leonard Nimoy - Roger
- Kent Smith - General

== Reception ==
Shortly after its release, the film was negatively reviewed by The New York Times' critic Bosley Crowther, but favorably reviewed in Variety: "With Jean Genet's apparent approval, Joe Strick and Ben Maddow have eliminated the play's obscene language (though it's still plenty rough) and clarified some of its obscurations. The result is a tough, vivid and dispassionate fantasy."

Following the release of the DVD in 2000, Karl Wareham also reviewed the film favorably: "The Balcony is recommended for those who like an enigma of a film, one that tugs at your subconscious long after the titles fade. It’s a film that reaches to the very heart of why our society works in the way it does, and presents unrelenting questions and dilemmas."

Ben Madow said "it's not a very good film, though it has some interesting passages in it. And it really exploited this idea of making this whorehouse a soundstage. I didn't know it at the time, but Strick had pledged his entire worth in order to get the bank loan to make the film. He never told anybody. So he was in a panic. It showed."

== Preservation ==
The Academy Film Archive preserved The Balcony in 2010.

== See also ==
- List of American films of 1963
