= Gene Callahan =

American art director (1923–1990)

Gene Callahan (November 7, 1923—December 26, 1990) was an American art director as well as set and production designer who contributed to over fifty films and more than a thousand TV episodes. He received nominations for the British Academy Film Award and four Oscars, including two wins (in 1962 and 1964).

== Biography ==
A native of Louisiana, Eugene F. Callahan had a lifelong association with the state. He kept a home in the capital, Baton Rouge, where he began his designing career in the 1940s as a student at Louisiana State University, and his penultimate film assignment was as production designer on Steel Magnolias, lensed in Natchitoches in 1989.

Callahan was a prolific contributor to early television, starting with the first full-schedule broadcast season in 1948–49. He worked on numerous live shows during TV's Golden Age and continued with filmed episodes through the late 1950s and early 60s. His first film as set decorator was 1959's The Fugitive Kind, and his fourth assignment, 1961's black-and-white The Hustler brought him his first Academy Award. 1964 was a banner year for him with two Oscar nominations—The Cardinal in the color category and America America in the category of black-and-white films, with the latter winning him his second Oscar. Unlike the 1962 win for The Hustler, which he shared with production designer Harry Horner or his shared nomination for The Cardinal with production designer Lyle R. Wheeler, the award for America America, was his alone. Elia Kazan's acclaimed epic set in turn-of-the-century Greece and Turkey was nominated for Best Picture and Best Director, but it was Callahan's epic production values that won the film's only Oscar.

Gene Callahan's professional relationship with Elia Kazan began two years before America America and extended to four of Kazan's final five films. The first title, 1961's Splendor in the Grass, which introduced Warren Beatty to the screen and won an Oscar for William Inge's screenplay, credited Callahan as the set decorator. Eight years later, he was the production designer for Kazan's next film after America, America, 1969's The Arrangement, which received almost entirely negative reviews and no Oscar nominations. He did not work on Kazan's next production, 1972's The Visitors, another poorly accepted title, but five years later, in 1977, there was one more Oscar nomination for Gene Callahan. The Last Tycoon, Elia Kazan's final directorial effort assigned him the task of recreating 1920s Hollywood as it was portrayed in F. Scott Fitzgerald's last, unfinished novel which reimagined the period setting and its driven, doomed protagonist, an Irving Thalberg-like movie producer, portrayed by Robert De Niro. The nomination (shared with art director Jack T. Collis and set decorator Jerry Wunderlich) was the only one given by the Academy to the film, which in addition to a mixture of good, tepid and negative reviews, was burdened by weak publicity and box office returns.

Gene Callahan died of a heart attack at his home in Baton Rouge, seven weeks after his 67th birthday. His final film, The Man in the Moon, a touching coming-of-age story filmed, as in the case of Steel Magnolias, in Natchitoches as well as Louisiana's Kisatchie National Forest, was released in October 1991, nearly a year after his death.
