= Full Circle (1960 TV series) =

1960s American soap opera

- Genre: Soap opera
- Screenplay by: Bill Barrett
- Directed by: Livia Granito; Bill Howell
- Starring: Robert Fortier; Dyan Cannon; Jean Byron
- Country of origin: United States
- No. of seasons: 1
- No. of episodes: 185

Production
- Producer: Norman Morgan
- Production location: CBS Television City
- Running time: 30 minutes

Original release
- Network: CBS
- Release: June 27, 1960 – March 10, 1961

Full Circle is an American soap opera that aired on CBS from June 27, 1960 to March 10, 1961. The half-hour series starred Robert Fortier, with Dyan Cannon, and Jean Byron as his romantic interests. It was the first American soap opera to be broadcast live-on-tape from Hollywood.

== Premise ==
Gary Donovan is a drifter who wants to see new places and meet new people. Pre-show publicity said "the series will take him all over the United States." The initial storyline had him taking a lumberyard job in the fictional town of Crowder, Virginia. There he runs afoul of the owner, Loyal Crowder, a wealthy older man whose ancestors founded the town. Crowder has a pretty 21 year old new wife named Lisa Linda. She had come from Maryland to Crowder, Virginia, with her first husband, who was mysteriously murdered. Lisa soon provokes her husband by paying attention to Donovan. He orders some of his workers to beat up Donovan, who then has his injuries tended by Dr. Katherine "Kit" Alderich. Donovan and Alderich soon form an attachment that must weather the machinations of both Lisa and Loyal Crowder.

== Response ==
The end credits (available on YouTube) list actors in alphabetical order, disguising that Fortier was the star and Gary Donovan the central character. Critics who reviewed the initial shows were negative about Fortier's diction and Cannon's acting, the dialogue, and the level of "sex" and violence which were very atypical of the genre at that time. As the first storyline developed, Cannon's treacherous young blonde Lisa proved to be the main attraction for what few viewers stuck with the show. Reviewers ignored Full Circle after the first episodes, but months later Cannon was still attracting interviewers.

== Production ==
Full Circle was a replacement for a show dealing with marital issues called For Better or Worse, which had run on CBS for a year in the same time slot. That show had monthly storylines with changing casts. Diane Cannon had appeared in the first storyline, "The Case of the Childless Bride", during July 1959. CBS producers must have felt her brash character's personality would also work well as Lisa Crowder.

Fortier and Byron had made a pilot together at Fox-TV for a series to be called Picture Window. It was offered to CBS, which didn't buy the show, but did like the chemistry the two stars exhibited, signing them for Full Circle instead.

The teleplays were written by Bill Barrett, who had much more success with his novels (The Lilies of the Field, The Left Hand of God). Full Circle was produced by Norman Morgan, directed by Bill Howell and Livia Granito, and made at CBS Television City.

According to an interview with Cannon, the actors reported to the studio at 7:00 am each weekday. They rehearsed until just before 11:00 am, performed the day's show, broke for lunch, during which the 40 page daily script for the next day might be read, then rehearsed for the next day's show until 5:00 pm.

== Broadcast history ==
CBS employed time shifting to broadcast Full Circle, using both live signals and recordings made on Quadruplex videotape, a procedure known as "live-on-tape". The actors performed the show live in CBS Television City at 11am Pacific time each weekday morning. The live performance was simultaneously videotaped. Viewers on the East Coast saw the live performance at 2:00 pm, while viewers in Central time zones saw the live broadcast at 1:00 pm. Stations in the Mountain states mostly carried the live broadcasts at 12:00 noon, but a few opted for the video recording which they broadcast at 1:00 pm or 2:00 pm. Pacific Coast stations also broadcast the videotaped performance at either 1:00 pm or 2:00 pm. Due to the short time spans involved, editing of the videotape wasn't feasible, so any live "flubs" would also be in the recordings.

Full Circle was slotted at 2:00 pm on CBS' published daytime schedule, directly following the hit Procter & Gamble-packaged serial As the World Turns. Despite its strong lead-in (ATWT was the most popular soap on the air that season), Circle failed to find an audience, finishing the 1960-61 television season with an abysmal 1.3 Nielsen rating, the lowest-ever figure for a daytime drama airing on American network TV. The serial was pulled off the air after just nine months in favor of the game show Face the Facts. (Note: This show, hosted by Red Rowe, had contestants guessing the outcome of already completed criminal trials, using actors to repeat dialogue from the courtroom record.) But Facts did not fare any better, lasting just seven months from March to October 1961, before it was replaced with another game show that proved to be much more successful: the original incarnation of Password.

== Cast ==
- Robert Fortier - Gary Donovan
- Diane Cannon - Lisa Linda Crowder
- Jean Byron - Dr. Katherine "Kit" Aldrich
- Sam Edwards - Deputy Sheriff
- Byron Foulger - Carter Talton
- John McNamera - Loyal Crowder
- Michael Ross - Virgil Denker
- Amzie Strickland - Beth Pearce
- William Lundmark - David Talton
