= Look to the Lilies =

- Original Playbill
- Music: Jule Styne
- Lyrics: Sammy Cahn
- Book: Leonard Spigelgass
- Basis: Novel by William Edmund Barrett; Lilies of the Field
- Productions: 1970 Broadway

Look to the Lilies is a stage musical with a book by Leonard Spigelgass, lyrics by Sammy Cahn, and music by Jule Styne.

Based on both the 1962 novel and film versions of Lilies of the Field, it tells the story of a group of German nuns, headed by a determined, dauntless Mother Superior, who manage to get an African American itinerant handyman/jack-of-all-trades named Homer Smith to build a chapel for the New Mexico community in which they live, despite not having money to pay him.

== Background ==
Styne composed his score with Ethel Merman in mind, but director Joshua Logan cast Shirley Booth instead. Sammy Davis Jr.'s salary demands put him out of the running, and the role of Homer went to Al Freeman Jr., whom Logan later described as "difficult" and "antagonistic."

== Original cast and characters ==
Character	Broadway (1970)
Mother Maria Marthe	Shirley Booth
Homer Smith	Al Freeman Jr.
Juan Archuleta	Titos Vandis
Sister Albertine	Taina Elg
Rosita	Carmen Alvarez
Juanita	Patti Karr
Sister Gertrude	Maggie Task
Monsignor O'Hara	Richard Graham
Sister Elizabeth	Virginia Craig

== Song list ==
Act I

- Gott is Gut - Mother Maria & Sisters
- First Class Number One Bum - Homer
- Himmlisher Vater - Mother Maria & Sisters
- Follow the Lamb - Company
- Meet My Seester - Juanita, Rosita
- Don't Talk About God - Homer
- When I Was Young - Mother Maria
- On That Day Of Days - Company
- You're A Rock - Homer
- I Am What I Am - Mother Maria
- I'd Sure Like To Give It A Shot - Homer & Chorus
- Homer's Pitch - Homer & Chorus
- Casamagordo, New Mexico - Sisters
- Follow The Lamb (reprise) - Chorus
- One Little Brick At A Time - Homer & Chorus
- I, Yes Me, That's Who - Mother Maria
- Prayer - Chorus
- I, Yes Me, That's Who (reprise) - Homer

== Production history ==
The musical premiered on Broadway on March 29, 1970 at the Lunt-Fontanne Theatre, where it ran for 25 performances and 31 previews. The musical was the last for Booth, over 70 years old at the time of the premiere, but she garnered unanimous critical raves from the critics.

Raymond Bordner wrote: "Miss Booth is simply marvelous all the way, and it is a real treat to see her again on Broadway". Richard Watts, in the New York Post, mentioned "Miss Booth's warm and gracious appeal." They also praised designer Jo Mielziner's use of desert tones, projections, scrims, and lighting to create the atmosphere and mood of the desert Southwest, but found little else of merit in the show.
