= 16th Writers Guild of America Awards =

16th WGA Awards
- Date: 1964
- Organized by: Writers Guild of America, East and the Writers Guild of America, West

The 16th Writers Guild of America Awards honored the best film writers and television writers of 1963. Winners were announced in 1964.

== Winners and nominees ==
=== Film ===
Winners are listed first highlighted in boldface.

**Best Written American Drama**: **Hud, Screenplay by Harriet Frank Jr. and Irving Ravetch; Based on the novel by Larry McMurtry**; America America, Written by Elia Kazan; Captain Newman, M.D., Screenplay by Richard L. Breen, Phoebe Ephron and Henry Ephron; Based on the novel by Leo Rosten; The Balcony, Screenplay by Ben Maddow; Based on the play by Bernard Frechtman and Jean Genet; The Great Escape, Screenplay by James Clavell and W.R. Burnett; Based on the book by Paul Brickhill; The Ugly American, Screenplay by Stewart Stern; Based on the novel by William J. Lederer and Eugene Burdick	**Best Written American Comedy**: **Lilies of the Field, Screenplay by James Poe; Based on the novel by William E. Barrett**; Charade, Screenplay by Peter Stone; Based on the story by Peter Stone and Marc Behm; Irma la Douce, Screenplay by I.A.L. Diamond and Billy Wilder; Based on the play by Alexandre Breffort; Love with the Proper Stranger, Written by Arnold Schulman; The Thrill of It All, Screenplay by Carl Reiner; Story by Carl Reiner and Larry Gelbart

=== Television ===
**Episodic Drama**: **"Man Out of Time" – Route 66 (CBS) – Lawrence B. Marcus**; "A Cardinal Act of Mercy: Part 1 & 2" – Ben Casey (ABC) – Norman Katkov; "Between Friday and Monday" – Empire (NBC) – Ken Trevey; The S.S. American Dream – Naked City (ABC) – Frank Pierson; "A Book for Burning" – The Defenders (CBS) – William Woolfolk	**Anthology, Any Length**: **"The Last of the Big Spenders" – The Dick Powell Theatre (NBC) – Richard Alan Simmons**; **"A Pair of Boots" – The Lloyd Bridges Show (CBS) – Mort R. Lewis**; "The Seven Deadly Sins" – Look Up and Live (CBS) – Don Kellerman; "The Judge" – The Dick Powell Theatre (NBC) – Bruce Geller
**Comedy/Variety, Any Length**: **"Barney's First Car" – The Andy Griffith Show (CBS) – James Fritzell and Everett Greenbaum**; Bob Hope Christmas Show (NBC) – Mort Lachman, Bill Larkin, John Rapp, Lester A. White, Charles Lee, Norman Sullivan and Gig Henry; "A Small Matter of Being Fired" – I'm Dickens, He's Fenster (ABC) – Leonard Stern and Don Hinkley; "When I Was Your Age" – My Three Sons (ABC) – Ernest Chambers; "Barney Mends a Broken Heart" – The Andy Griffith Show (CBS) – Aaron Ruben; "It May Look Like a Walnut" – The Dick Van Dyke Show (CBS) – Carl Reiner

=== Special awards ===
John Huston was awarded the Laurel Award for Screenwriting Achievement, and Morgan Cox was awarded the Valentine Davies Award.
