= A Majority of One (film) =

1961 American film by Mervyn LeRoy

- British quad poster by Tom Chantrell
- Directed by: Mervyn LeRoy
- Written by: Leonard Spigelgass
- Based on: A Majority of One; 1959 play by Leonard Spigelgass
- Produced by: Harry Stradling
- Starring: Rosalind Russell; Alec Guinness; Ray Danton; Madlyn Rhue; Mae Questel; Marc Marno; Gary Vinson; Sharon Hugueny; Frank Wilcox; Francis De Sales; Yuki Shimoda; Harriet MacGibbon
- Cinematography: Harry Stradling
- Edited by: Philip W. Anderson
- Music by: Max Steiner
- Distributed by: Warner Bros. Pictures
- Release date: December 27, 1961
- Running time: 156 minutes
- Country: United States
- Language: English
- Box office: $2 million (US/Canada)

A Majority of One is a 1961 American comedy film directed by Mervyn LeRoy and starring Rosalind Russell and Alec Guinness. It was adapted from the play of the same name by Leonard Spigelgass, which was a Broadway hit in the 1959–1960 season starring Gertrude Berg and Cedric Hardwicke.

The title originates from a quote from Henry David Thoreau: "Any man more right than his neighbors, constitutes a majority of one already." Thoreau believed that the one person who is on the right side of the question counts for more than do all of the people who are on the wrong side.

== Plot ==
Bertha Jacoby, a Jewish widow, is convinced by her daughter, Alice Black, to move from Brooklyn, New York to Tokyo to be closer to Alice and her husband, Jerry, now stationed at the US embassy in Tokyo. Visiting Bertha with the news of the impending move to Japan, Alice and Jerry, who consider themselves liberal, are condescendingly polite to Bertha's friend, Essie, who is concerned that their neighborhood is being compromised by ethnic minorities. Bertha overlooks the otherwise good-natured Essie's prejudice, which she does not believe she shares. Nevertheless, Bertha has difficulty overcoming her resentment toward the Japanese, the people she blames for killing her son during World War II, which will loom large if she is to live in Japan.

Aboard the ship to Tokyo, Bertha meets Koichi Asano, an affable millionaire Japanese Buddhist businessman who is important to Jerry's diplomatic mission negotiating between Japanese and US business interests. While Asano is gracious to Bertha, she treats him coolly. Noting her coldness, Asano asks her directly whether he has offended her or whether she resents the Japanese, and she admits her feelings about her son's death. Asano gently informs her that he lost a son whose ship was destroyed by a dive bomber and a daughter who was a nurse in Hiroshima, both killed in a war over which he had no control.

Gaining perspective, Bertha begins to return Asano's politeness, forming a connection as they pass time onboard sharing details of their families, cultural differences and faiths. They have each lost spouses within the past four years. Bertha and her husband ran a small artificial flower business. Jerry is pleased that Bertha is socializing with Asano until he sees them dancing together at a party. Alice warns Bertha to avoid becoming too friendly to someone who may use her to influence Jerry's diplomatic role, reminding Bertha that "Asano is a Japanese." Bertha points out Alice's hypocrisy but makes an excuse to Asano to retire early for the evening. Although Asano senses Bertha's renewed distance, on disembarking, he presents Bertha with his card and offers his help in Japan.

The Japanese and Western diplomatic worlds are very formal and separate. The US diplomats make little effort to learn the Japanese language or customs. When Jerry has an exchange with Asano at a business meeting, he inadvertently insults Asano by bowing too deeply and by coughing during Asano's speech, which Asano takes as mockery. Asano ends diplomatic negotiations, citing Jerry's behavior to the ambassador.

Wishing to reconcile with Asano, Bertha dares to take a taxi, though unable to communicate with the driver, to visit Asano at his home. Delighted to see her, Asano introduces her to his daughter-in-law and showers her with lavish gifts and hospitality while respecting her kosher practices. He asks permission to formally court her by taking her to social events. Astonished but pleased, she promises to consider it, aware of the many serious complicating factors. When Bertha informs her daughter and son-in-law of Asano's courtship, they object to the prospect of an interracial marriage. Bertha reminds them of their criticisms of Essie's prejudice, pointing out their double standard. When Asano returns her call, Bertha declines his proposal by asserting that it is too soon for courtship; they are both just lonely, still mourning their dead spouses. Bertha intends to return to New York, but they agree to continue to see each other on his frequent trips.

Sometime later in Bertha's New York apartment, Asano is briefly presented to Essie, who greets him graciously before leaving. Sitting down to dinner together, Bertha and Asano agree that enough time has passed so they can now attend plays, concerts and national events, since he has accepted a post at the United Nations.

== Cast ==
- Rosalind Russell as Bertha Jacoby
- Alec Guinness as Koichi Asano
- Ray Danton as Jerry Black
- Madlyn Rhue as Alice Black
- Mae Questel (credited as Mae Questal) as Essie Rubin
- Marc Marno as Eddie
- Gary Vinson as Mr. McMillan
- Sharon Hugueny as Bride
- Frank Wilcox as Noah Putnam
- Francis De Sales as American embassy representative
- Yuki Shimoda as Mr. Asano's Secretary
- Harriet MacGibbon as Lily Putnam
- Alan Mowbray as Captain Norcross (This was Mowbray's final film role.)
- George Takei as Mr. Asano's majordomo
- Maria Tsien as Mr. Asano's Maid (uncredited)

== Production ==
Alec Guinness visited Japan days prior to the start of production to study the culture, people and customs. He wore heavy makeup to play the role. Rosalind Russell was hesitant about her role, believing that Gertrude Berg, who played the role on stage and won a Tony Award for her performance, deserved the part; studio head Jack L. Warner refused to cast Berg, and Russell agreed to portray the role after learning that she could costar with Guinness.

In his 1994 autobiography, George Takei, a Japanese-American actor who plays a minor role in A Majority of One, wrote that he had been "shocked" at the "grotesquely offensive" latex makeup applied to Guinness's eyes, and by the "incomprehensible gibberish" of his Japanese lines, producing a disappointing and "disastrous" performance.

== Reception ==
In a contemporary review for The New York Times, critic A. H. Weiler called the film a "truly heartwarming and entertaining affair" and wrote "[T]his comedy blend of specialized, local middle-class mores and humor and Nipponese formality becomes a wholly acceptable, truly heartwarming and entertaining affair despite its exotic ingredients. ... Miss Russell ... does an amazingly fine job, which has to be seen to be believed."

Variety declared: "Leonard Spigelgass’ brew of schmaltz and sukiyaki is an outstanding film ... Russell's Yiddish hex-cent, though at times it sounds like what it is – a Christian imitating a Jew—is close enough to the genuine article. Guinness becomes Japanese through physical suggestion and masterful elocution."

John L. Scott of the Los Angeles Times called the film "fine entertainment with a broad appeal".

== Awards and nominations ==
Award	Category	Nominee(s)	Result
Academy Awards	Best Cinematography – Color	Harry Stradling	Nominated
Directors Guild of America Awards	Outstanding Directorial Achievement in Motion Pictures	Mervyn LeRoy	Nominated
Golden Globe Awards	Best Motion Picture – Comedy		Won
Golden Globe Awards	Best Actress in a Motion Picture – Musical or Comedy	Rosalind Russell	Won
Golden Globe Awards	Best Film Promoting International Understanding		Won
Laurel Awards	Top Comedy		5th Place
Writers Guild of America Awards	Best Written American Comedy	Leonard Spigelgass	Nominated

== See also ==
- List of American films of 1961
