= Leonard Spigelgass =

American dramatist

- Born: November 26, 1908; Brooklyn
- Died: February 15, 1985 (aged 76); Los Angeles
- Burial place: Hollywood Forever
- Relatives: Beulah Roth (sister)

Leonard Spigelgass (November 26, 1908 – February 15, 1985) was an American playwright, film producer and screenwriter. During his career, Spigelgass wrote the scripts for 11 Academy Award-winning films. He himself was nominated in 1950 for the story for Mystery Street and garnered three Writers Guild of America nominations over the course of his career. Spigelgass was also a friend of Gore Vidal's, who used Spigelgass as the model for Vidal's semi fictionary "wise hack" character in the latter's series of essays about Hollywood.

== Biography ==
=== Life ===
Born to a Jewish family in Brooklyn, New York, Spigelgass graduated from New York University in 1929. He was a literary and drama critic for The Brooklyn Eagle and the Saturday Review of Literature before moving to Hollywood.

=== Fox ===
Spigelglass got his start collaborating on the script for Erich von Stroheim's Walking Down Broadway at Fox Films. After the film was shot, studio executives ordered the film to be re-edited and re-shot; it was released under the new title Hello, Sister! (1933). Spigelglass worked as assistant to Julian Josephson, head of story at Fox.

Spigelglass was also credited as writer on Stingaree (1934) and Escape to Paradise at RKO.

=== Universal ===
In December 1933, Spigelglass accepted a contract at Universal to work as scenario and story editor. While there, his story I'll Fix It (1934) was bought for Columbia.

In June 1934, Spigelglass was promoted to producer. His first film in that capacity was Princess O'Hara (1935), based on a story by Damon Runyon, which he helped write.

He became story editor for Major Pictures and wrote a film of the life of Madame Curie for Universal.

At Universal, he wrote for Letter of Introduction (1938), Service de Luxe (1938), Unexpected Father (1940), Private Affairs (1940), and The Boys from Syracuse (1940).

He produced the musical One Night in the Tropics (1940), the film debut of Abbott and Costello. He wrote Tight Shoes (1941) and Butch Minds the Baby (1942), based on a story by Runyon.

=== Warner Bros. ===
He wrote some films at Warner Bros., including Million Dollar Baby (1941) and All Through the Night (1942). He also wrote The Man They Couldn't Kill for Edward G. Robinson, but it was not made.

At RKO, Spigelglass wrote The Big Street (1942), based on a Runyon story, and They Got Me Covered (1942) for Bob Hope. He did The Youngest Profession (1943) at MGM. He also sold an original script to Fox titled No Place Like Home, but it appears not to have been made.

=== World War II ===
Spigelgass served as a lieutenant colonel in World War II and, with Frank Capra, planned and produced Army and Navy Screen Magazine, a bi-weekly, filmed news update for American troops abroad.

=== Paramount ===
He wrote For Her to See for Hal Wallis, which became So Evil My Love (1948). Also for Wallis, he wrote The Perfect Marriage (1947) and The Accused (1949), and he did I Was a Male War Bride (1949) for Fox.

In 1948, he was part of the Writers Guild fight against the blacklist. He sold Murder at Harvard to MGM, but it was not made.

=== MGM ===
Spigelglass signed a long-term contract at MGM where he wrote Mystery Street (1950), which earned him an Oscar nomination. He followed it with Night into Morning (1951), The Law and the Lady (1951), Because You're Mine (1952), Scandal at Scourie (1953), Athena (1954), and Deep in My Heart (1954). He produced a documentary series titled MGM Parade, and wrote the musicals Ten Thousand Bedrooms (1957) and Silk Stockings (1957). He wrote International Review, meant to be an all-star musical, but it was not made. He left MGM when his boss Dore Schary was fired.

"When I left Hollywood in 1957, I was in the glue factory", he later said. "That I had written movies for many years meant nothing."

=== Broadway ===
Spigelglass moved to New York, where he wrote for TV shows such as Playhouse 90 and Climax!, including a story of the life of Helen Morgan.

He wrote the play A Majority of One (1959), directed by Dore Schary. Starring Gertrude Berg, it was a hit and ran for 556 performances.

This reignited Hollywood's interest in Spigelglass. He returned to Hollywood and found himself treated with far more respect as the writer of a hit play than he had during his entire time there before.

"At the age of 50, I am an author and not a hack", he said.

He wrote the film adaptation of Majority of One and the big screen version of Gypsy (1962) both directed by Mervyn Le Roy. The film rights for Majority went for $500,000.

He returned to Broadway and wrote a series of plays, but none had the success of his first. A musical adaptation of Cafe Crown was not produced. The Free Thinkers was announced for 1961 but not made. Dear Me, The Sky Is Falling (1963) (originally titled Libby) had a short run despite starring Gertrude Berg. Remedy for Winter (1965) (known as Upper Case), Scuttle Under the Bonnet (1965) and The Playgirls (1966) did not make it to Broadway. The Wrong Way Light Bulb (1969) only had a short run. He wrote the book The Scuttle Under the Bonnet (1962).

He also wrote the book to the musical We've Done a Whole New Thing but it was not produced.

Look to the Lilies (1970) based on Lilies of the Field, but it only had a short run despite starring Shirley Booth. So too did Mack & Mabel (1974) based on an idea of Spigelglass.

=== Later career ===
In 1971, Spiegelgass joined the USC Cinema Department as an adjunct professor.

In the 1970s, Spigelgass wrote an ABC Afterschool Special and several Academy Award ceremonies.

He wrote the play Interview (1978), which had some productions.

== Family ==
Spigelgass's sister, Beulah Roth, was a political speechwriter for Franklin Roosevelt and Adlai Stevenson, and was married to photographer Sanford H. Roth, a close friend of James Dean's. Spigelgass died in Los Angeles, California.

== Selected filmography ==
- Hello, Sister! (1933)
- Stingaree (1934)
- I'll Fix It (1935)
- Princess O'Hara (1935) – associate producer
- Letter of Introduction (1938)
- Service de Luxe (1938)
- Unexpected Father (1939)
- Private Affairs (1940)
- The Boys from Syracuse (1940)
- One Night in the Tropics (1940) – associate producer
- Million Dollar Baby (1941) – based on his story ""Miss Wheelwright Discovers America""
- Tight Shoes (1941)
- All Through the Night (1942)
- Butch Minds the Baby (1942)
- The Big Street (1942) – also associate producer
- The Youngest Profession (1943)
- They Got Me Covered (1943) – original story
- The Perfect Marriage (1947)
- So Evil My Love (1948)
- The Accused (1949)
- I Was a Male War Bride (1949)
- Mystery Street (1950) – story
- Night Into Morning (1951)
- The Law and the Lady (1951)
- Because You're Mine (1952)
- Scandal at Scourie (1953)
- Athena (1954)
- Deep in My Heart (1954)
- MGM Parade (1955–56) – director
- Ten Thousand Bedrooms (1957)
- Playhouse 90 – episodes "Eloise, "One Coat of White", "The Helen Morgan Story"
- Silk Stockings (1957)
- Climax! – episodes "A Man of Taste", "Mr Runyon of Broadway", "Along Came a Spider"
- Pepe (1960)
- A Majority of One (1961) – also based on his play
- Gypsy (1962)
- ABC Afterschool Specials – episode "Cyrano" (1974)
- 20th Century Fox Presents... A Tribute to Darryl F. Zanuck (1974)
- 48th Academy Awards (1976)
- 50th Academy Awards (1978)
- 52nd Academy Awards (1980)
- 54th Academy Awards (1982)
- 55th Academy Awards (1983)

== Theatre credits ==
- A Majority of One (1959–60) – writer
- Dear Me, The Sky is Falling (1963) – writer
- The Playgirls (1966)
- The Wrong Way Light Bulb (1969) – writer
- Look to the Lilies (1970) – author of book of musical based on Lilies of the Field
- Mack & Mabel (1974) – based on idea
