= 19th Golden Globe Awards =

Film award ceremony in 1962

- Date: March 5, 1962

Highlights
- Best Film: Drama: The Guns of Navarone
- Best Film: Comedy: A Majority of One
- Best Film: Musical: West Side Story

The 19th Golden Globe Awards, honoring the best in film and television for 1961, were held on March 5, 1962.

== Winners and nominees ==
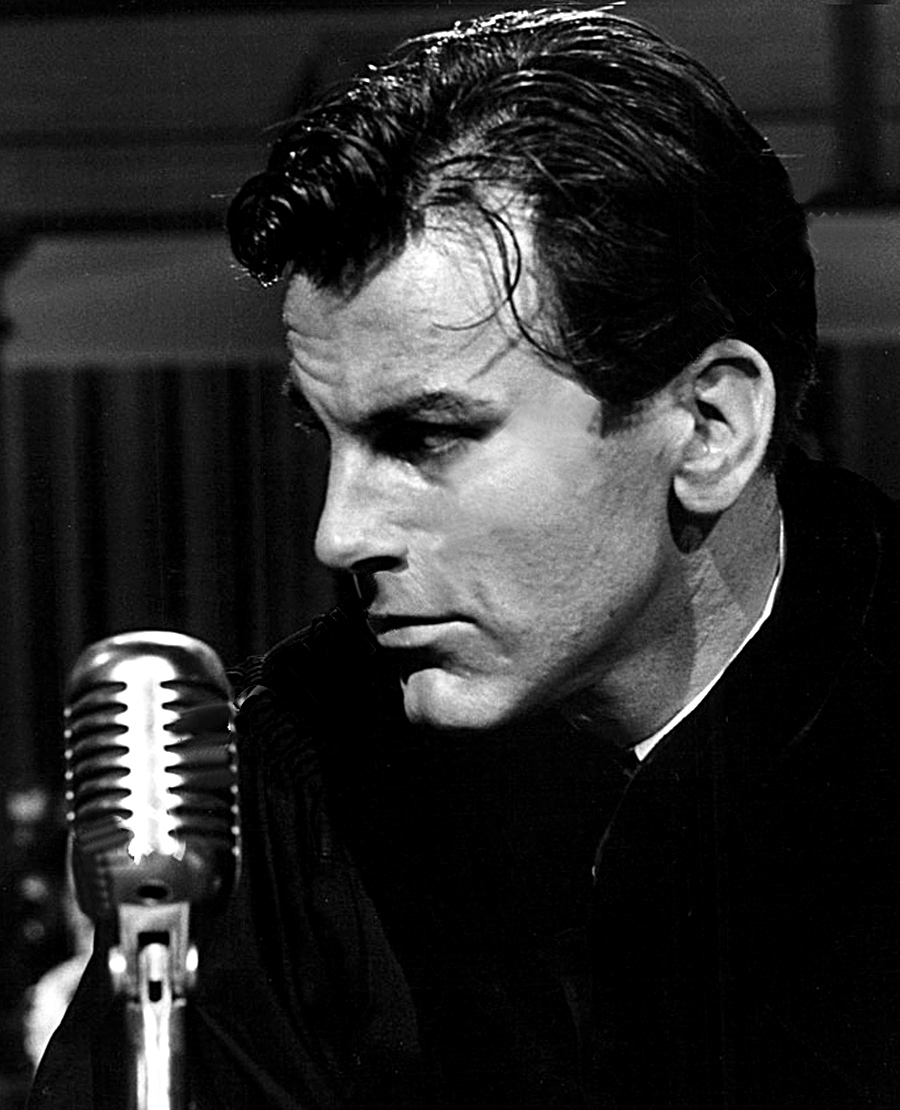
Maximilian Schell won for Judgment at Nuremberg

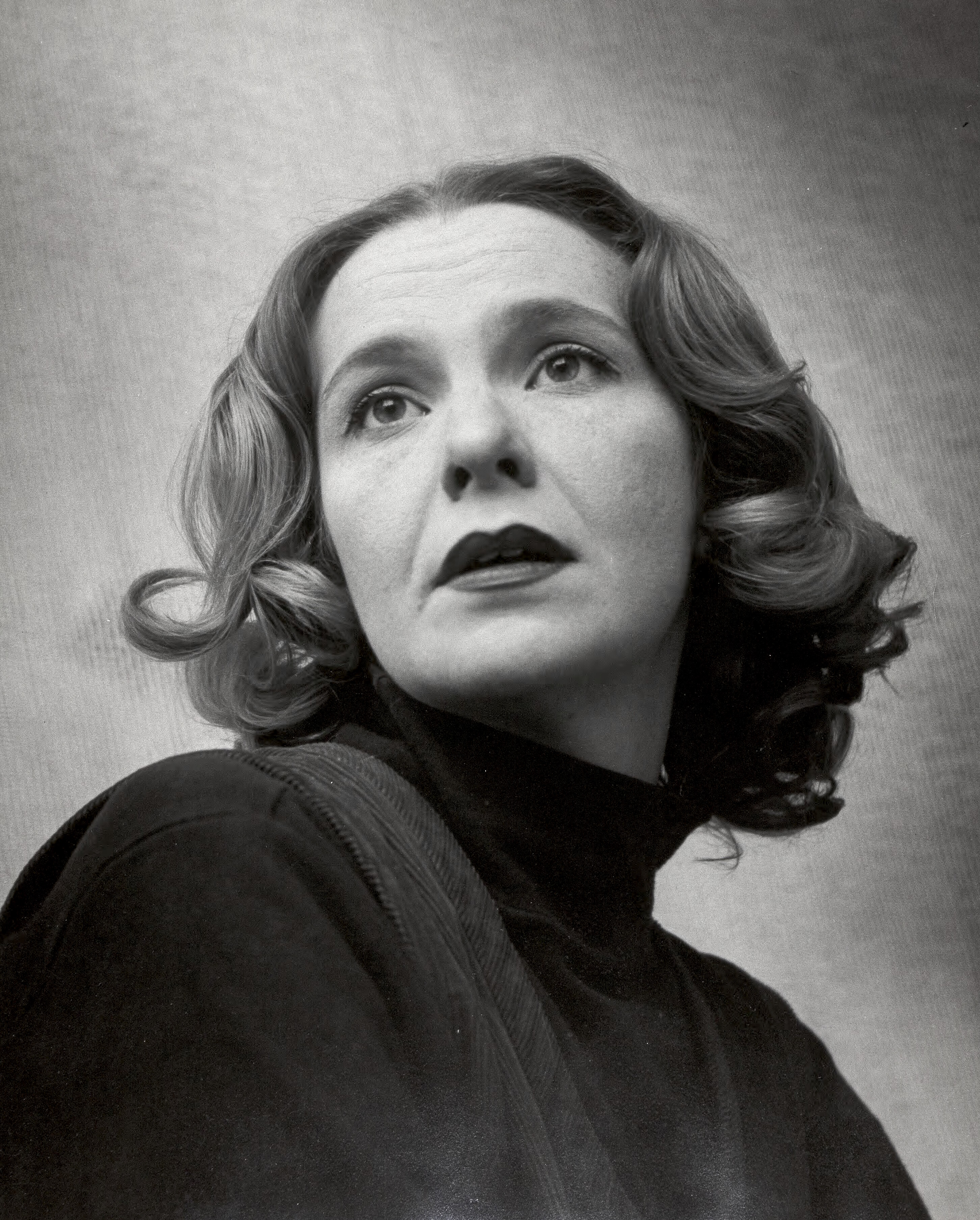
Geraldine Page won for Summer and Smoke

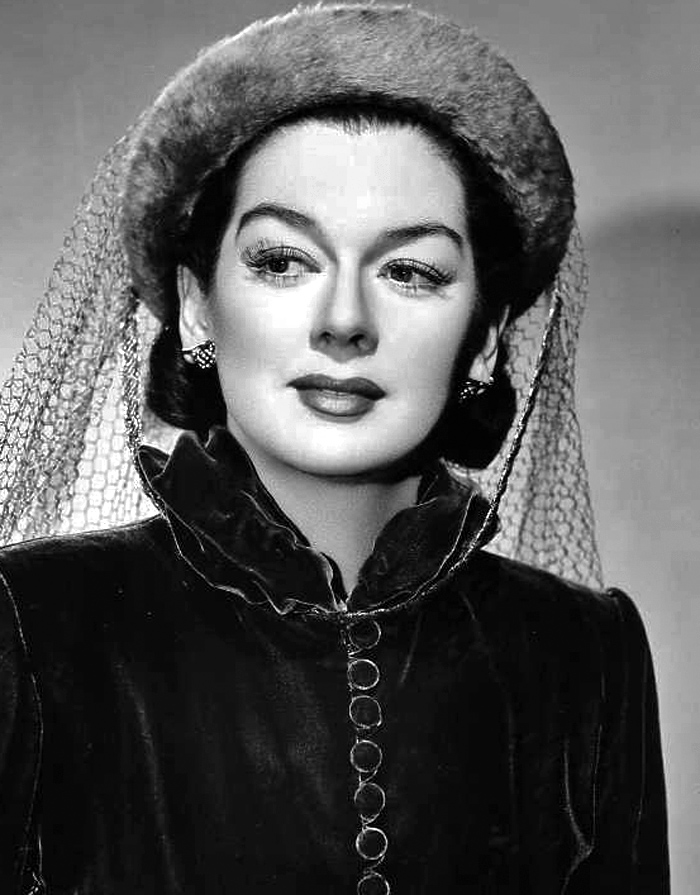
Rosalind Russell won for A Majority of One

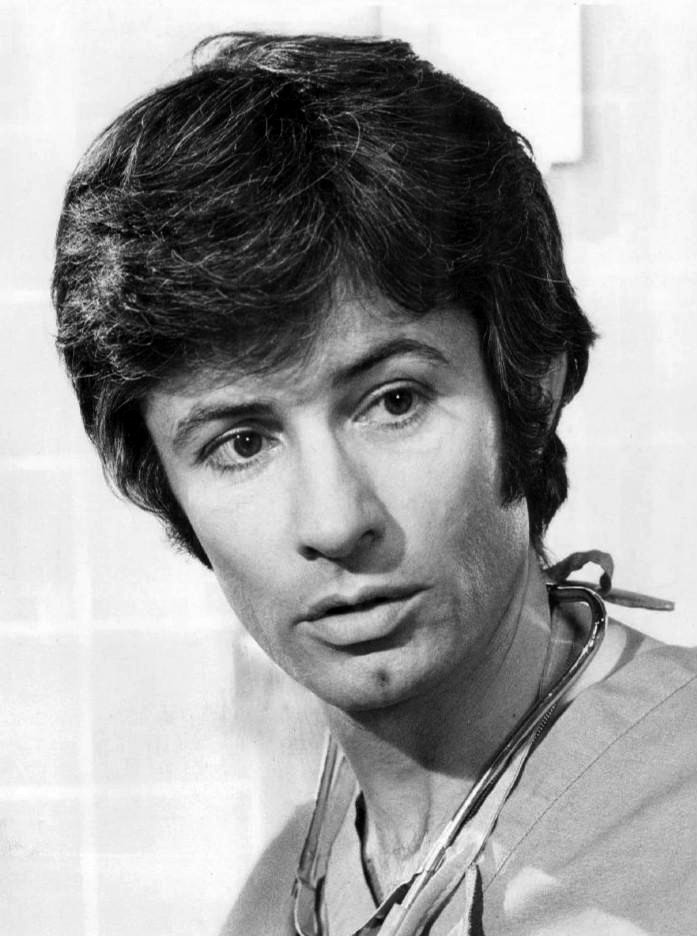
George Chakiris won for West Side Story

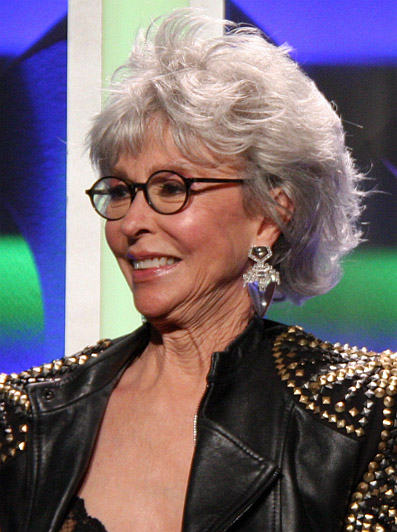
Rita Moreno won for West Side Story

=== Film ===
Best Motion Picture
Drama	Comedy or Musical
The Guns of Navarone; El Cid; Fanny; Judgment at Nuremberg; Splendor in the Grass	A Majority of One; Breakfast at Tiffany's; One, Two, Three; The Parent Trap; Pocketful of Miracles
Best Performance in a Motion Picture – Drama
Actor	Actress
Maximilian Schell – Judgment at Nuremberg; Warren Beatty – Splendor in the Grass; Maurice Chevalier – Fanny; Paul Newman – The Hustler; Sidney Poitier – A Raisin in the Sun	Geraldine Page – Summer and Smoke; Leslie Caron – Fanny; Shirley MacLaine – The Children's Hour; Claudia McNeil – A Raisin in the Sun; Natalie Wood – Splendor in the Grass
Best Performance in a Motion Picture – Comedy or Musical
Actor	Actress
Glenn Ford – Pocketful of Miracles; Fred Astaire – The Pleasure of His Company; Richard Beymer – West Side Story; Bob Hope – Bachelor in Paradise; Fred MacMurray – The Absent-Minded Professor	Rosalind Russell – A Majority of One; Bette Davis – Pocketful of Miracles; Audrey Hepburn – Breakfast at Tiffany's; Hayley Mills – The Parent Trap; Miyoshi Umeki – Flower Drum Song
Best Supporting Performance in a Motion Picture – Drama, Comedy or Musical
Supporting Actor	Supporting Actress
George Chakiris – West Side Story; Montgomery Clift – Judgment at Nuremberg; Jackie Gleason – The Hustler; Tony Randall – Lover Come Back; George C. Scott – The Hustler	Rita Moreno – West Side Story; Fay Bainter – The Children's Hour; Judy Garland – Judgment at Nuremberg; Lotte Lenya – The Roman Spring of Mrs. Stone; Pamela Tiffin – One, Two, Three
Other
Best Film - Musical	Best Director
West Side Story; Babes in Toyland; Flower Drum Song	Stanley Kramer – Judgment at Nuremberg; Anthony Mann – El Cid; Jerome Robbins and Robert Wise – West Side Story; J. Lee Thompson – The Guns of Navarone; William Wyler – The Children's Hour
Best Foreign Language Film	Silver Globe
Two Women (La ciociara) • Italy; The Good Soldier Schweik • West Germany; The Important Man • Mexico	The Good Soldier Schweik ( (West Germany); The Important Man (Mexico)
Best Original Score	Best Original Song
"The Guns of Navarone" – Dimitri Tiomkin; "El Cid" – Miklós Rózsa; "Fanny" – Harold Rome; "King of Kings" – Miklós Rózsa; "Summer and Smoke" – Elmer Bernstein	"Town Without Pity" - Town Without Pity (Dimitri Tiomkin - music, Ned Washington - lyrics)
Most Promising Newcomer - Male	Most Promising Newcomer - Female
Warren Beatty; Richard Beymer; Bobby Darin; George C. Scott	Ann-Margret; Jane Fonda; Christine Kaufmann; Pamela Tiffin; Cordula Trantow
Best Film Promoting International Understanding	Henrietta Award (World Film Favorite)
A Majority of One; Judgment at Nuremberg; Bridge to the Sun	Charlton Heston; Marilyn Monroe

=== Special awards ===
Cecil B. DeMille Award

- Judy Garland

Special Merit Award

- Samuel Bronston - El Cid

Samuel Goldwyn Award

- The Mark

Special Journalistic Merit Award

- Army Archerd (Daily Variety)
- Mike Connolly (The Hollywood Reporter)

=== Television ===
Only winners announced

Best Television Series
Best TV show
What's My Line?; My Three Sons
Best Performance in a Television Series Drama
Best TV Star - Male	Best TV Star - Female
Bob Newhart; John Daly	Pauline Frederick

== Award breakdown ==
=== Film ===
The following films received multiple nominations:

Nominations	Title
6	Judgment at Nuremberg
5	West Side Story
3	A Majority of One
3	The Guns of Navarone
3	Summer and Smoke

The following films received multiple awards:

Wins	Title
3	West Side Story
3	A Majority of One
2	The Guns of Navarone
2	Judgment at Nuremberg
1	Summer and Smoke
