= Al Freeman Jr. =

American actor (1934–2012)

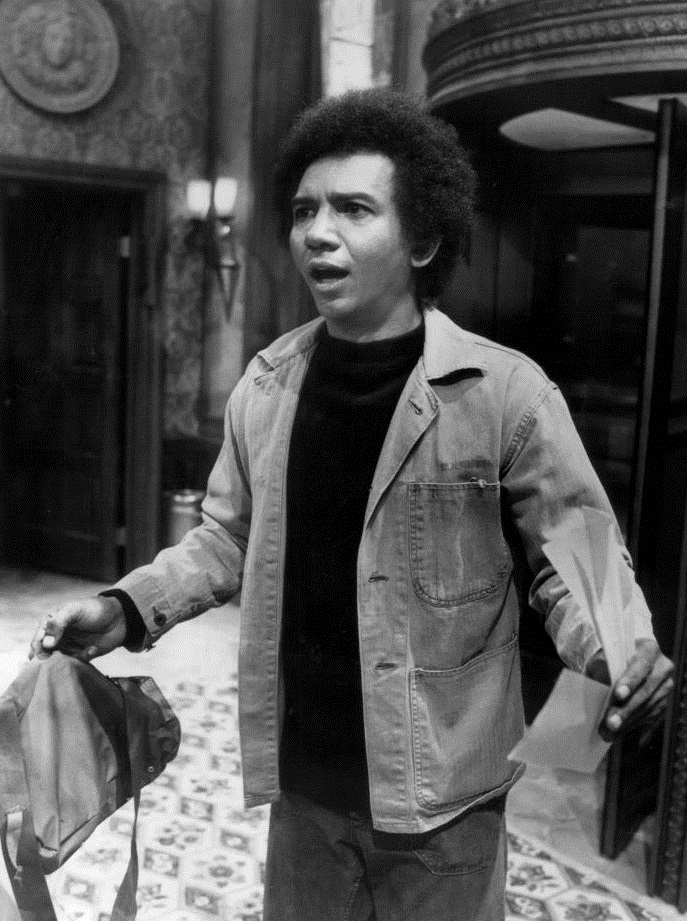
- Freeman in 1975
- Born: Albert Cornelius Freeman Jr. March 21, 1934; San Antonio, Texas, US
- Died: August 9, 2012 (aged 78); Washington, D.C., US
- Years active: 1958–2004
- Spouse: Sevara E. Clemon (m. 1960)

Albert Cornelius Freeman Jr. (March 21, 1934 – August 9, 2012) was an American actor, director, and educator. A life member of The Actors Studio, Freeman appeared in a wide variety of plays, ranging from Leroi Jones' Slave/Toilet to Joe Papp's revivals of Long Day's Journey Into Night and Troilus and Cressida. His acting credits include the movies My Sweet Charlie, Finian's Rainbow, and Malcolm X, as well as television series The Mod Squad, Maude, Kojak and Homicide: Life on the Street, and a long-running role on the soap opera One Life to Live.

== Early life, family and education ==
Al Freeman was born in San Antonio, Texas, to Lottie Brisette (née Coleman) and Albert Cornelius Freeman, a jazz pianist. His parents divorced when he was nine years old, his father relocated to Columbus, Ohio, so Al was raised in both places.

Al Freeman Jr. attended Los Angeles City College, studying acting in 1951, but left school to enlist in the US Air Force, serving in the Korean War. After three years in the military, he returned to Los Angeles, taking courses in "speech, broadcasting and drama" and "train[ing] for the stage with Jeff Corey, Harold Clifton, and Frank Silvera. He "later earned a master's degree in education from the University of Massachusetts."

== Career ==
Freeman's acting career began in 1958, working on several TV shows. He relocated to New York City in 1959, and the following year made his Broadway debut in The Long Dream (based on the 1958 novel by Richard Wright). He appeared in Black Like Me, the 1964 film adaptation of the novel of the same name. He starred opposite Frank Sinatra in the 1968 feature film The Detective, directed by Gordon Douglas. Freeman starred opposite Shirley Knight in the Los Angeles production of the play Dutchman, written by Amiri Baraka (then known as LeRoi Jones), and in 1967, Dutchman was adapted into a film directed by English filmmaker Anthony Harvey. Also on Broadway, he performed as Homer Smith in Look to the Lilies, a musical adaptation of Lilies of the Field, opposite Shirley Booth. The show ran for 25 performances and 31 previews in 1970. He played the title role in the TV movie My Sweet Charlie (1970) which co-starred Patty Duke. He acted in another Broadway play, The Hot L Baltimore (1973).

His most recognized role was as police captain Ed Hall on the ABC soap opera One Life to Live from 1972 through 1987, with recurring appearances in 1988 and 2000. He won a Daytime Emmy Award for Outstanding Lead Actor for that role in 1979, the first actor from the show as well as the first African-American actor to earn the award. He played Malcolm X in the 1979 miniseries Roots: The Next Generations. In the 1990s, he had a recurring guest role as the manipulative Baltimore deputy police commissioner James Harris in Homicide: Life on the Street. Freeman acted in the motion picture Down in the Delta (1998). His portrayal of Elijah Muhammad, the Nation of Islam leader, in the film Malcolm X earned him the 1992 NAACP Image Award for Outstanding Supporting Actor in a Motion Picture. Guest appearances included the TV series The Cosby Show and Law & Order, in which he played a character in a 1990 episode and a different character in a 2004 episode.

In 1988, Freeman became a visiting artist-in-residence at the Department of Theatre Arts of Howard University in Washington, D.C., then became a full-time faculty member in 1991. He was its department chairman for six years, beginning in 2005, and occasionally directed plays there and on Martha's Vineyard, Massachusetts, at Vineyard Playhouse.

== Personal life and death ==
Freeman married Sevara E. Clemon on January 8, 1960, but the marriage ended in divorce.

He enjoyed his 40-foot (12 m) sailboat "moored in the Potomac basin."

Freeman died on August 9, 2012, in Washington, D.C., at age 78. The next day, a memorial service was held for him at Howard University. In 2014, the Environmental Theatre Space at the Howard University Fine Arts Building was renamed The Al Freeman Jr. Environmental Theatre Space in his honor.

== Selected filmography ==
=== Film ===
Year	Title	Role	Notes
1958	Torpedo Run	Sam Baker	Uncredited
1960	This Rebel Breed	Satchel	
1961	Sniper's Ridge	Medic Gwathney	
1964	Black Like Me	Thomas Newcomb	
1964	The Troublemaker	Intern	
1964	Ensign Pulver	Taru	
1966	For Pete's Sake		
1967	Dutchman	Clay	
1968	The Detective	Robbie	
1968	Finian's Rainbow	Howard	
1969	The Lost Man	Dennis Lawrence	
1969	Castle Keep	Pvt. Allistair Piersall Benjamin	
1970	My Sweet Charlie	Charles Roberts	
1971	A Fable	The Leader	
1972	To Be Young, Gifted and Black		
1988	Seven Hours to Judgment	Danny Larwin	
1992	Malcolm X	Elijah Muhammad	
1994	Assault at West Point: The Court-Martial of Johnson Whittaker	Old Johnson Whittaker	
1995	Once Upon a Time... When We Were Colored	Poppa	
1998	Down in the Delta	Earl Sinclair	

=== Television ===
Year	Title	Role	Notes
1967	The Edge of Night	Assistant District Attorney Ben Lee	
1968	The F.B.I.	Alan Harmon	1 episode
1969	Judd for the Defense	Jeff Jones	1 episode
1972	The Mod Squad	Jessie Cook	1 episode
1972–1988	One Life to Live	Captain Ed Hall	
1974	Maude	Roy	1 episode
1975	Hot l Baltimore	Charles Bingham	Main role
1976	Kojak	Donald Mosher	1 episode
1978	King	Damon Lockwood	
1979	Roots: The Next Generations	Malcolm X	
1985	The Cosby Show	Coach Ernie Scott	1 episode
1990	Law & Order	Reverend Thayer	1 episode
1995–1996	Homicide: Life on the Street	Deputy Commissioner James Harris	
2004	Law & Order	Stan Wallace	1 episode
