= Private Affairs (1940 film) =

1940 film

- Directed by: Albert S. Rogell
- Written by: Charles Grayson; Leonard Spigelgass; Peter Milne
- Based on: One of the Boston Bullertons by Walton Green
- Produced by: Burt Kelly
- Starring: Nancy Kelly; Hugh Herbert; Roland Young; Robert Cummings; Montagu Love
- Cinematography: Milton R. Krasner
- Edited by: Philip Cahn
- Music by: Hans J. Salter
- Production company: Universal Pictures
- Distributed by: Universal Pictures
- Release date: July 5, 1940
- Running time: 74 minutes
- Country: United States
- Language: English

Private Affairs is a 1940 comedy film starring Nancy Kelly, with a supporting cast including Hugh Herbert, Roland Young, and Robert Cummings. The film was directed by Albert S. Rogell.

== Plot ==
Amos Bullerton from Boston is the first in a long line of patrician aristocrats to marry a commoner, which makes his father, Noble, furious and prompts him to remove Amos from his will. Amos takes up residence in New York and starts working as a stock broker.

After fifteen years in New York without any contact with his family, Amos is visited by his young daughter Jane. She is coming to New York to get his approval of dumping her current aristocratic fiancé Herbert Stanley. Instead she is determined to marry Jimmy Nolan, a law clerk working for her grandfather Noble. Amos runs out of luck and has to partner up with a taxi driver when he is too much in debt and cannot pay his fare. He "hires" the driver, Angus McPherson to get rid of the debt. He is hired by a dubious stock broker named George Gilkin, who wants to use Amos' last name for a profit. Amos is tricked use his last name to draw new clients to his business. Amos is left in charge of the firm's new Boston branch, and has to return home after years of exile.

Soon enough he finds that the Bullerton name isn't quite as helpful as he had imagined. Jimmy comes up with the idea to throw a big welcome-home party to give the illusion of Noble's support for hs long lost son. Jimmy plans to drive Noble to the party without the old man knowing where he is headed. When Noble shows up at the party the stock indeed rises, but Gilkin is anxious to drive the price of the stock down again, eager to make a profit if his own. When Amos and Angus find out about Gilkin's plans, they pursue him on hus way back to New York, to stop him from spreading ill-fated rumors about the Bullertons at the stock market.

After passing numerous obstacles, Amos manages to prevent Gilkin's return to New York and locks him up in a small town somewhere in New England where he can't do any harm. Jane finally marries her beloved Jimmy and Amos reconciles with his father.

== Cast ==
- Nancy Kelly as Jane Bullerton
- Hugh Herbert as Angus McPherson
- Roland Young as Amos Bullerton
- Robert Cummings as Jimmy Nolan
- Montagu Love as Noble Bullerton
- Jonathan Hale as George Gilkins
- Florence Shirley as Mrs. Gilkins
- G. P. Huntley Jr. as Herbert Stanley
- Dick Purcell as Dick Cartwright
- Leonard Carey as Casper
- Mary Forbes as Mrs. Stanley
- Douglas Wood as Mr. Stanley
- Granville Bates as Judge Hamilton

== Production ==
It was known as One of the Boston Bullertons, the title of the magazine story on which it was based. Universal announced the film in March 1940. Filming took place in April 1940.

It was retitled Private Affairs in May.
