= Trial by Jury (TV series) =

- Genre: Dramatized court show
- Presented by: Raymond Burr
- Composer: Lenny Stack
- Country of origin: United States
- Original language: English
- No. of seasons: 1

Production
- Executive producers: Dick Clark; Bob Stewart
- Producer: Mary James
- Running time: 30 minutes
- Production companies: Bob Stewart Productions; Dick Clark Productions; Viacom Enterprises

Original release
- Network: Syndication
- Release: 1989 – 1990

Trial by Jury is an American dramatized court show that aired in first-run syndication during the 1989-90 television season.

== Cast and characters ==
The series features real-life courtroom cases that were reenacted by actors. The series was hosted by Raymond Burr portraying the character of Judge Gordon Duane (not to be confused with judging the cases, his character rather served as the program's presenter, uninvolved with the actual proceedings).

The series featured an actor judge as well as actor attorneys. Actress Madlyn Rhue played the judge role during the cases. Rhue performed the role from a wheelchair, a detail that was unseen to viewers as she sat behind the bench while presiding (she suffered from multiple sclerosis that began prior to this series and which caused her need for a wheelchair). Rhue was notable in her presence on the program as a female performing in the role of judge, novel for court shows to that point as typically only men played judge roles. Joseph Campanella performed the role of prosecuting attorney and Charles Siebert performed the role of defense attorney.

== Format overview ==
Episodes commenced with Burr's character, Judge Gordon Duane, serving as interactive host with television viewers. Despite the judge title, Judge Gordon took no active role in the court proceedings themselves. The character, rather, opened each episode from a judge's chambers donning a judicial robe. As Judge Gordon Duane, he broke the forth wall by speaking directly to viewers, asking questions about the case, providing answers to those questions, sharing his views of the case and about points of law. The show's courtroom audience got a chance to decide its own verdict before the scripted jury verdict was handed down. In a September 1989 interview just prior to the court show's debut, Burr detailed the making and scripted nature of the program, the popular trend of court shows at the time. Burr was quoted as making the following statements:

We couldn't do a show that was not based someplace along the lines of real cases. It's like a phrase in music—there is no new phrase, everything has already been written. But it will happen some time that the show will appear on a Thursday and the same day the headlines will reflect a similar case and people will say we got the show right out of the headline. We tried to be pretty contemporary, but the show was written six months ahead of time. Once we went on the air with a story involving two ministers being kidnapped in Canada. When it went on the air, that's exactly what had happened. The government of Canada asked us not to put the show on because it would be dangerous for the two ministers and it was not put on in Canada.

The program is remembered for featuring then-unknown singer Tori Amos in an episode in which she portrayed a woman accused of murdering her married lover. It also marked one of the first television appearances of Cuba Gooding Jr.
