= Kenner (film) =

1969 film by Steve Sekely

- Theatrical release poster
- Directed by: Steve Sekely
- Screenplay by: Robert L. Richards; Harold Clemins
- Story by: Mary P. Murray
- Produced by: Mary P. Murray
- Starring: Jim Brown; Madlyn Rhue; Robert Coote; Ricky Cordell; Charles Horvath; Prem Nath
- Cinematography: Dieter Liphardt
- Edited by: Richard V. Heermance
- Music by: Prem Dhawan; Piero Piccioni
- Production companies: M & M Productions
- Distributed by: Metro-Goldwyn-Mayer
- Release date: April 23, 1969
- Running time: 92 minutes
- Country: United States
- Language: English

Kenner is a 1969 American drama film produced by Mary Phillips Murray, directed by Steve Sekely and written by Robert L. Richards and Harold Clemins. The film stars Jim Brown, Madlyn Rhue, Robert Coote, Ricky Cordell, Charles Horvath and Prem Nath. The film was released on April 23, 1969, by Metro-Goldwyn-Mayer.

== Plot ==
After his partner is murdered in Singapore, Roy Kenner travels to Bombay in search of the killer, a man named Tom Jordan. He meets a fatherless young boy, Saji, and begins to fall in love with the boy's mother, Anasuya, then takes Saji under his wing when she is accidentally killed. After a final confrontation with Jordan atop a building, Kenner takes the boy home with him to America.

== Cast ==
Actor	Role
Jim Brown	Roy Kenner
Madlyn Rhue	Anasuya
Robert Coote	Henderson
Ricky Cordell	Saji
Charles Horvath	Tom Jordan
Prem Nath	Sandy
Kuljit Singh	Young Sikh
Sulochana Latkar	Mother Superior
Ursula Prince	Sister Katherine
Tony North	American Friend
Ming Hung	Ring Referee
R.P. Wright	Gym Owner
Nitin Sethi	Customs Officer
Mahendra Jhaveri	Young Hindu
G.S. Aasie	Shoe Merchant
Ravikant	Bald Disciple
Hercules	Robed Man
Khalil Amir	Robed Man

== See also ==
- List of American films of 1969
