= Robert Fortier =

American film, television and theatre actor

- Fortier in Star Trek, 1968
- Born: Robert Ray Fortier; November 5, 1926; West Hollywood, California, U.S.
- Died: January 1, 2005 (aged 78); Orange, California, U.S.
- Occupations: Film, television and theatre actor
- Years active: 1950–1987

Robert Ray Fortier (November 5, 1926 – January 1, 2005) was an American film, television and theatre actor. He was known for playing Scotty in the American adventure television series The Troubleshooters.

== Life and career ==
Fortier was born in West Hollywood, California. He was originally a member of the New York City Ballet and was a gymnast at the University of California, Los Angeles. He began his screen career in 1950, with an uncredited role in the film Let's Dance. The next year, he appeared in the films Texas Carnival and Show Boat. During his screen career, he appeared in Broadway plays such as Pal Joey, playing Victor, and Me and Juliet, playing Don Juan.

Later in his career, in 1959, he starred as Scotty in the NBC adventure television series The Troubleshooters, starring along with Keenan Wynn and Bob Mathias. After the series ended in 1960, he starred as Gary Donovan in the CBS soap opera television series Full Circle, starring along with Dyan Cannon and Jean Byron. He guest-starred in television programs including Gunsmoke, Bonanza, The Fugitive, The Law and Mr. Jones, The Life and Legend of Wyatt Earp, Outlaws, The Millionaire, Colt .45 and Star Trek: The Original Series, and played the recurring role of Captain Jampel in the second and third season of the ABC drama television series Combat!. He also appeared in films such as Popeye (as town drunk Bill Barnacle), A Wedding, McCabe & Mrs. Miller, 3 Women and Heaven Can Wait.

Fortier retired from acting in 1987, last appearing in the film O.C. and Stiggs.

== Death ==
Fortier died on January 1, 2005, in Orange, California, at the age of 78.
