= Tick, Tick, Tick (film) =

1970 film by Ralph Nelson

- 1970 movie poster
- Directed by: Ralph Nelson
- Written by: James Lee Barrett
- Produced by: James Lee Barrett; Ralph Nelson
- Starring: Jim Brown; George Kennedy; Fredric March
- Cinematography: Loyal Griggs
- Edited by: Alex Beaton
- Music by: Jerry Styner
- Distributed by: Metro-Goldwyn-Mayer
- Release date: January 9, 1970
- Running time: 100 minutes
- Country: United States
- Language: English
- Box office: $2,144,000 (US/Canada rentals)

Tick, Tick, Tick, stylized as ...tick...tick...tick..., is an American crime drama film directed by Ralph Nelson and released by Metro-Goldwyn-Mayer in 1970. Racially provocative for its time, the film stars Jim Brown in the role of a black man elected as the sheriff of a rural county in the American South. It has become something of a cult classic for its cutting-edge portrayal of racial relations and its tense narrative. It was the first MGM film released in the 1970s.

== Plot ==
In a small Southern town, a black man, Jim Price is elected sheriff over John Little, the white incumbent. Racial tensions exist in the community, and Price gets little assistance from Little, who is leaving office, or from Mayor Parks, who insists he be consulted on any decision the new sheriff makes.

A white man, John Braddock, is arrested on a manslaughter charge after his drunken driving causes the death of a young girl. Braddock's father carries considerable influence and demands his son be freed. Price's deputy, Bradford Wilkes, is beaten by Little's former deputy, Bengy Springer.

Another arrest is made, this time of a black man, George Harley, accused of rape. The townspeople's mood turns uglier by the minute, particularly when Braddock's father threatens to spring his son by force if necessary.

Little's conscience gets the better of him. He agrees to become Price's new deputy. Together, they try in vain to persuade other men in town to side with them against Braddock's vigilantes and to convince the mayor to call in the National Guard for help. Alone against the mob, Price and Little form a barricade and prepare for the worst when their fellow townsmen suddenly join them in the street.

== Cast ==
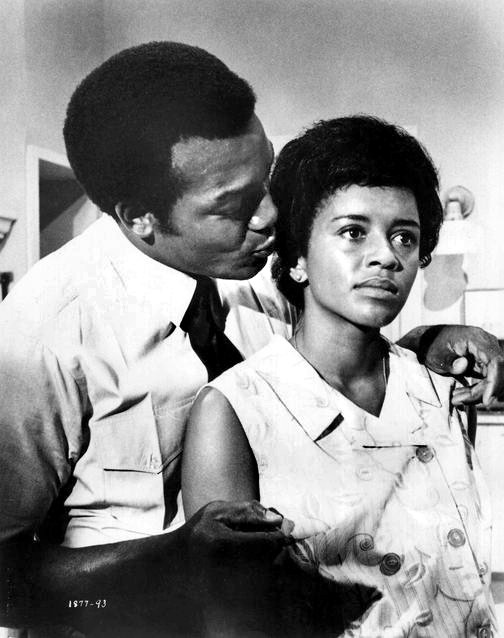
Jim Brown and Janet MacLachlan in ...tick...tick...tick... - publicity still, 1970

- Jim Brown as Jim Price
- George Kennedy as John Little
- Fredric March as Mayor Jeff Parks
- Lynn Carlin as Julia Little
- Don Stroud as Benjamin "Bengy" Springer
- Janet MacLachlan as Mary Price
- Richard Elkins as Bradford Wilkes
- Clifton James as D.J. Rankin
- Bob Random as John Braddock
- Mills Watson as Joe Warren
- Bernie Casey as George Harley
- Anthony James as H.C. Tolbert
- Dub Taylor as Junior
- Ernest Anderson as Homer
- Karl Swenson as Braddock Sr.
- Alex Hakobian as Colusa County Resident

== Production ==
=== Writing ===
Screenwriter and producer James Lee Barrett also created the television adaptation of In the Heat of the Night.

=== Casting ===
The film's lead was played by Jim Brown, who had recently retired as a professional football player. Brown and George Kennedy had previously appeared together in the war film The Dirty Dozen. Another co-star, Bernie Casey, had played in the National Football League from 1961 to 1968, his career intersecting with that of Brown, who was an NFL star from 1957 to 1965.

It was the penultimate film appearance of screen legend Fredric March.

=== Filming ===
It was made in and around Colusa, California. The town's central courthouse square was remodeled to appear like those found in the American South. The same courthouse was also used for exterior shots in the 1962 classic To Kill a Mockingbird.

== Release ==
The film was released theatrically in the United States by Metro-Goldwyn-Mayer in January 1970, the same year as Nelson's Soldier Blue. It was shown in an anamorphic 2.40:1 aspect ratio. A radio advertisement for the film summarized the story simply: "tick...tick...tick is the sound of time...running out."

== Home media ==
The film was never given an official VHS release in the United States. It was released on DVD in 2012 via the Warner Archive on-demand service.

== See also ==
- List of American films of 1970
