= Ralph Nelson =

American film and television director (1916–1987)

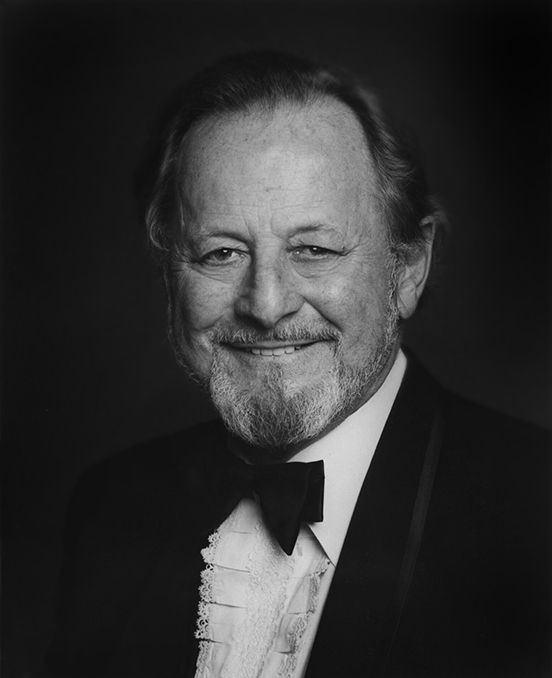
- Portrait of Ralph Nelson
- Born: Ralph Leo Nelson; August 12, 1916; Long Island City, New York, U.S.
- Died: December 21, 1987 (aged 71); Santa Monica, California, U.S.
- Years active: 1950–1979
- Spouses: Celeste Holm (m. 1936; div. 1939) Beatrice Bahnsen (m. 1945; div. 1947) Barbara Powers (m. 1954; died 1981)
- Children: 4, including Ted Nelson

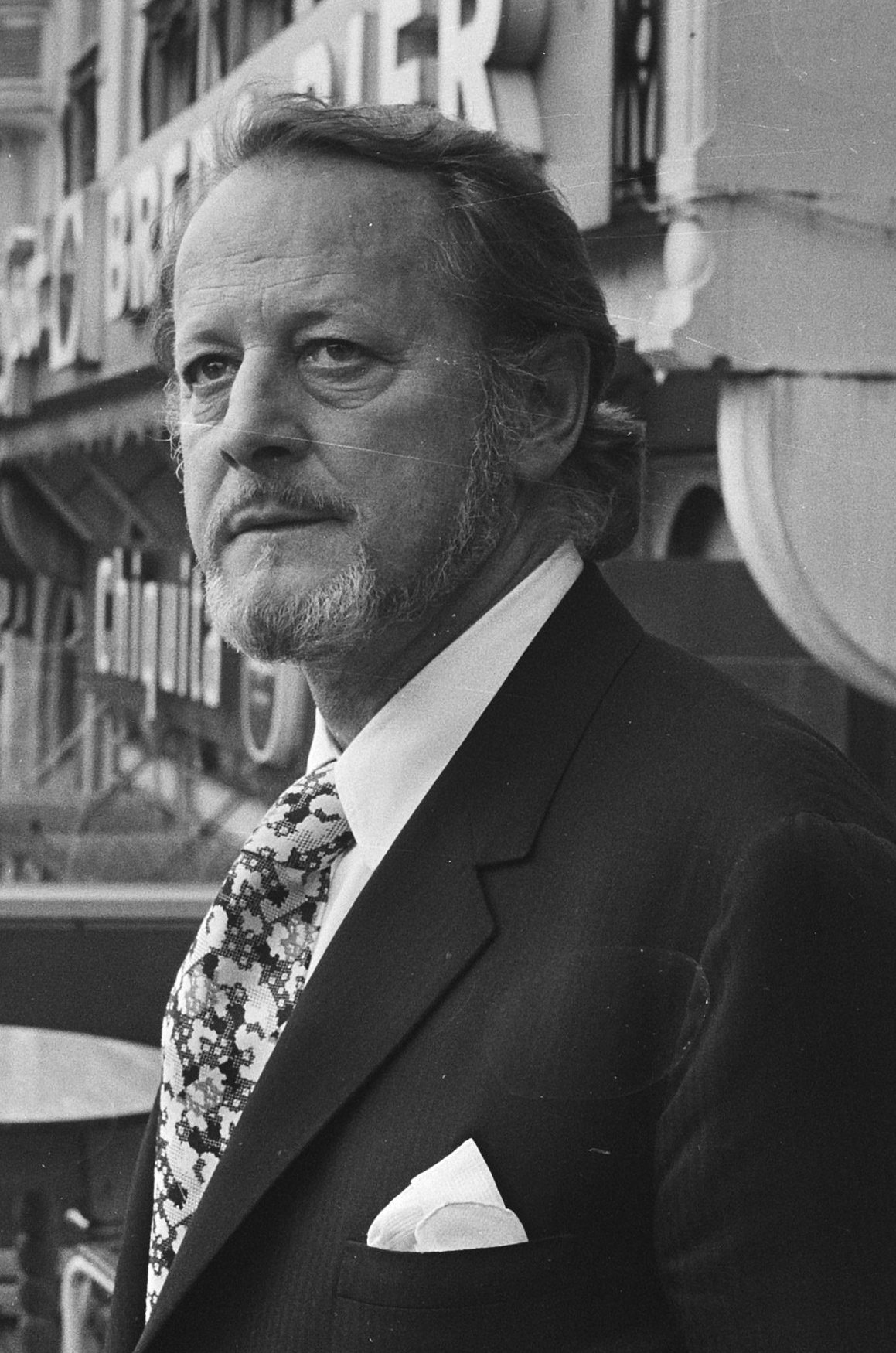
Ralph Nelson (1970)

Ralph Leo Nelson (August 12, 1916 – December 21, 1987) was an American film and television director, producer, writer, and actor. He was best known for directing Lilies of the Field (1963), Father Goose (1964), and Charly (1968), films which won Academy Awards.

== Early years ==
Born on August 12, 1916, in Long Island City, New York, Nelson was the younger of two children born to Swedish immigrants Edith Maria and Karl Leo Nelson.

When he was 15 years old, Nelson's activities ranged from winning an oratory contest sponsored by The New York Times to hearing a judge describe him as "potentially the most dangerous juvenile criminal" in New York City. Before he was 16 years old he had been in jail for vagrancy and suspicion of burglary in 12 states.

A freight train ride with hobos took Nelson to Los Angeles. He supported himself temporarily by selling programs for the 1932 Los Angeles Olympics, but a charge of attempted robbery put him in jail. Told that he had to either leave the city or serve 90 days, he chose neither option but went to the Union Rescue Mission. There he received food and housing and gained employment washing dishes at the Lido Hotel. He returned to New York, where he finished high school, ran errands for Broadway producers and actors, and studied acting. He was married to actress Celeste Holm from 1936 to 1939, becoming the father of author, sociologist and computer visionary Ted Nelson.

Nelson served in the U.S. Army Air Corps as a fighter pilot and flight instructor during World War II.

== Career ==
After returning to Los Angeles, Nelson was an understudy for Leslie Howard as Hamlet at the Biltmore Theatre, and he later performed in that venue with a company headed by Alfred Lunt and Lynn Fontanne. He toured with them for six years, working as actor and stage manager.

Before the war ended, he had a play on Broadway: "The Wind Is Ninety" ran from June to September 1945. Kirk Douglas was in the cast.

Nelson directed the acclaimed episode "A World of His Own" of The Twilight Zone (he should not be confused with The Twilight Zone's production manager, Ralph W. Nelson). He also directed both the television and film versions of Rod Serling's Requiem for a Heavyweight.

In 1958 Nelson directed The Nutcracker, on CBS, that network's only live color broadcast of the year. Time magazine said that he "kept the episodes sharp, the camera steady. Result: an overall sense of gaiety and space."

He directed Charly, the 1968 film version of Flowers for Algernon, for which Cliff Robertson won an Academy Award, as well as several racially provocative films in the 1960s and early 1970s, including the Academy Award-winning Lilies of the Field, ...tick...tick...tick..., Christmas Lilies of the Field, The Wilby Conspiracy, and Soldier Blue. The starring role in "Lilies" led to Sidney Poitier winning the Academy Award for Best Actor.

Nelson also directed the Cary Grant comedy Father Goose, the offbeat Soldier in the Rain with Jackie Gleason and Steve McQueen, the crime story Once a Thief, and Rita Hayworth's last film, The Wrath of God. He both directed, and briefly appeared in, Duel at Diablo, starring James Garner and Sidney Poitier.

Nelson's other credits include several episodes of TV's Starsky & Hutch, the '70s camp horror classic Embryo, and A Hero Ain't Nothin' but a Sandwich.

A television drama about mounting the live show of Requiem for a Heavyweight called The Man in the Funny Suit was made in 1960, with Nelson both writing and directing. Nelson, Serling, Red Skelton, Keenan Wynn and Ed Wynn appeared in it as themselves.

He returned to TV in the late 1970s with a string of TV movies, including a sequel to Lilies of the Field called Christmas Lilies of the Field which starred Billy Dee Williams, Maria Schell, and Fay Hauser.

== Death ==
He died of complications of cancer in his lung and brain on December 21, 1987, at Care West hospice in Santa Monica, California, aged 71.

== Recognition ==
In 1957 Nelson received an Emmy Award for Best Director for his work on Requiem for a Heavyweight. In 1964, Nelson was nominated for the Academy Award for Best Picture for producing his 1963 film, Lilies of the Field.

== Filmography ==
=== Director ===
Film

- Requiem for a Heavyweight (1962)
- Lilies of the Field (1963)
- Soldier in the Rain (1963)
- Fate Is the Hunter (1964)
- Father Goose (1964)
- Once a Thief (1965)
- Duel at Diablo (1966)
- Counterpoint (1968)
- Charly (1968)
- ...tick...tick...tick... (1970)
- Soldier Blue (1970)
- Flight of the Doves (1971)
- The Wrath of God (1972)
- The Wilby Conspiracy (1975)
- Embryo (1976)
- A Hero Ain't Nothin' but a Sandwich (1977)

Television

- Ford Startime - "The Jazz Singer" (1959)
- Playhouse 90 - "Requiem for a Heavyweight" (1956)
- Blood Money (1957)
- The Twilight Zone - "A World of His Own" (1960)
- The Farmer's Daughter (1963) Episode: "The Speechmaker: Part 1"
- The Man Who Bought Paradise (1965)
- Lady of the House (1978)
- Because He's My Friend (1978)
- Christmas Lilies of the Field (1979)
- You Can't Go Home Again (1979)

=== Actor ===
- Stump Run (1959)
- Lilies of the Field (1963) - Mr. Ashton (uncredited)
- Duel at Diablo (1966) - Col. Foster
- Counterpoint (1968) - Belgian Officer (uncredited)
- Charly (1968) - Convention Speaker (uncredited)
- ...tick...tick...tick... (1970) - New York driver caught in speed trap (uncredited)
- Soldier Blue (1970) - Agent Long
- The Wrath of God (1972) - Executed Prisoner (uncredited)
