= James Lee Barrett =

American writer

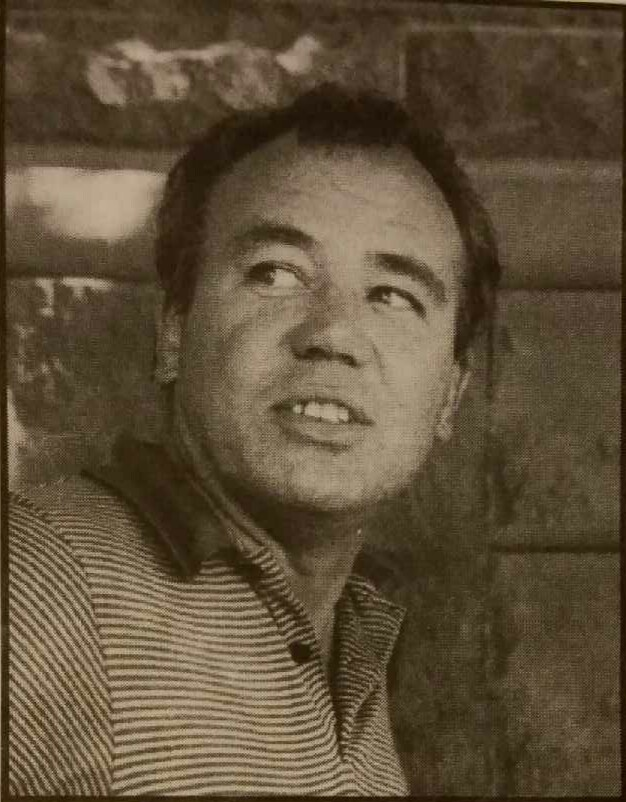
- Born: November 19, 1929; Charlotte, North Carolina, U.S.
- Died: October 15, 1989 (aged 59); Templeton, California, U.S.
- Occupations: Producer, screenwriter, author

James Lee Barrett (November 19, 1929 – October 15, 1989) was an American author, producer and screenwriter.

== Biography ==
Barrett was born in 1929 in Charlotte, North Carolina and graduated in 1950 from Anderson University (South Carolina). Prior to his career as a screenwriter, he served in the United States Marines.

His first screenplay (based on his teleplay The Murder of a Sand Flea) was for the 1957 film, The D.I., which starred Jack Webb as a Marine Corps drill instructor at MCRD Parris Island. Barrett had been on Parris Island as a recruit in 1950 and served in the Korean War.

Barrett, along with Peter Udell and Phillip Rose won the 1975 Tony Award for Best Book of a Musical for Shenandoah, which was based on his 1965 film by the same name, which starred James Stewart.

Other notable works written or co-written by Barrett include the 1965 epic film The Greatest Story Ever Told, Smokey and the Bandit, The Green Berets, Bandolero! and co-writing On the Beach. Barrett also scripted a made-for-TV remake of The Defiant Ones (which starred Carl Weathers and Robert Urich in the Sidney Poitier and Tony Curtis roles), and adapted the 1967 movie In the Heat of the Night for a weekly series. (The show starred Carroll O'Connor and Howard Rollins, in the Rod Steiger and Sidney Poitier roles.) Barrett wrote and produced ...tick...tick...tick..., a similarly themed Southern crime drama starring Jim Brown and George Kennedy.

== Death ==
Barrett died in Templeton, California in 1989 of cancer, aged 59.

== Select Credits ==
- Chevron Hall of Stars - "Cold Harbor" (1956)
- Chevron Hall of Stars - "Heart of a Dream" (1956)
- Kraft Theatre - "The Murder of a Sand Flea" (1956)
- Kraft Theatre - "Teddy Bear" (1956)
- The D.I. (1957)
- Kraft Theatre - "Run, Joe, Run" (1958)
- Kraft Theatre - "Dog in a Bus Tunnel" (1958)
- Outlaws - "The Avenger" (1961)
- Checkmate - "Hot Wind on a Cold Town" (1964)
- The Greatest Story Ever Told (1965)
- The Truth About Spring (1965)
- Shenandoah (1965)
- Bandolero! (1968)
- The Green Berets (1968)
- The Undefeated (1969)
- ...tick... tick... tick... (1970) - also produced
- The Cheyenne Social Club (1970) - also produced
- Fools' Parade (1971) - also produced
- Something Big (1971) - also produced
- The Cowboys (1974) - various episodes
- Shenandoah (1974) (musical)
- Smokey and the Bandit (1977)
- The Awakening Land (1978)
- Stubby Pringle's Christmas (1978)
- Mayflower: The Pilgrims' Adventure (1979)
- Wild Horse Hank (1979)
- The Day Christ Died (1980)
- Belle Starr (1980)
- Angel City (1980)
- You Are the Jury (1984) - episode
- The Defiant Ones (1986)
- Stagecoach (1986)
- Vengeance: The Story of Tony Cimo (1986)
- Our House (1986–88) - creator
- The Quick and the Dead (1987)
- Poker Alice (1987)
- April Morning (1988)
- In the Heat of the Night (1988–95) - developed for television
- Ruby Jean and Joe (1996)
- Warden of Red Rock (2001)

== See also ==
- List of famous U.S. Marines
