= Letter of Introduction =

1938 film by John M. Stahl

- Directed by: John M. Stahl
- Written by: Sheridan Gibney; Leonard Spigelgass
- Screenplay by: Bernice Boone
- Produced by: John M. Stahl
- Cinematography: Karl Freund
- Edited by: Ted J. Kent
- Music by: Frank Skinner
- Production company: Universal Pictures
- Distributed by: Universal Pictures
- Release date: August 5, 1938 (United States)
- Running time: 104 minutes
- Country: United States
- Language: English
- Budget: $1.1 million or $1,250,000

Letter of Introduction is a 1938 American comedy-drama film directed by John M. Stahl. In 1966, the film entered the public domain in the United States because the claimants did not renew its copyright registration in the 28th year after publication.

== Plot ==
An aging actor, John Mannering, is surprised when his estranged daughter, Kay Martin, shows up. She is an actress trying to succeed on Broadway. He is persuaded to perform on Broadway for the first time in twelve years in a play with her. He is anxious about his performance, so turns to alcohol to overcome his self-doubt. He tries to re-establish his relationship with his daughter while trying to hide from the press that she is his daughter.

== Cast ==
- Adolphe Menjou as John Mannering
- Andrea Leeds as Katherine "Kay" Martin
- George Murphy as Barry Paige
- Edgar Bergen as himself
- Rita Johnson as Honey
- Ann Sheridan as Lydia Hoyt
- Ernest Cossart as Andrews, the Butler
- Frank Jenks as Joe, theatre prompter
- Eve Arden as Cora Phelps
- Charlie McCarthy as Himself - dummy
- Mortimer Snerd as Himself - dummy
- Ray Walker as Reporter
