= Warden of Red Rock =

2001 TV film

- Genre: Western
- Written by: James Lee Barrett
- Directed by: Stephen Gyllenhaal
- Starring: James Caan; David Carradine; Rachel Ticotin; Brian Dennehy
- Theme music composer: Michel Colombier
- Country of origin: United States
- Original language: English

Production
- Executive producer: Patricia Clifford
- Producer: Paul Freeman
- Production location: Durango, Mexico
- Cinematography: Henner Hoffman
- Editor: Richard Halsey
- Running time: 88 minutes
- Production company: Viacom Productions

Original release
- Network: Showtime
- Release: March 18, 2001

Warden of Red Rock is a 2001 American Western television film starring James Caan. It was directed by Stephen Gyllenhaal and written by James Lee Barrett.

== Cast ==
- James Caan as John Flinders
- David Carradine as Mike Sullivan
- Rachel Ticotin as Maria McVale
- Brian Dennehy as Sheriff Selwyn Church
- Billy Rieck as Harry Joe Reese
- Gisela Sanchez as Dolores
- Lloyd Lowe as Ray Otis
- Kirk Baltz as Gil Macon
- Jim Beaver as Jefferson Bent
- Sergio_Calderón as Toro
- Gregory Norman Cruz as Taza
- Michael Cavanaugh as Senator Paul Townsend
- Mark Metcalf as Carl McVale
- Michael Harney as Henry Masters
- Roger Cudney as Prisoner
