= The Big Street =

1942 film by Irving Reis

- Original poster
- Directed by: Irving Reis
- Screenplay by: Leonard Spigelgass
- Based on: Little Pinks; Collier's Weekly (1940) by Damon Runyon
- Produced by: Damon Runyon
- Starring: Henry Fonda; Lucille Ball; Barton MacLane; Eugene Pallette; Agnes Moorehead; Sam Levene; Ray Collins; Marion Martin; William T. Orr; Ozzie Nelson
- Cinematography: Russell Metty
- Edited by: William Hamilton
- Music by: Roy Webb
- Production company: RKO Radio Pictures
- Distributed by: RKO Radio Pictures (US)
- Release dates: September 4, 1942 (U.S.); August 13, 1942 (Premiere-New York City)
- Running time: 88 minutes
- Country: United States
- Language: English

The Big Street is a 1942 American drama film starring Henry Fonda and Lucille Ball, based on the 1940 short story "Little Pinks" by Damon Runyon, who also produced it. It was directed by Irving Reis from a screenplay by Leonard Spigelgass. The Big Street was a nickname for Broadway, where the film's plot begins and all of Runyon's stories take place.

== Plot ==
Pretty but cold-hearted singer Gloria Lyons is crippled in a fall after her boyfriend, New York City nightclub owner Case Ables, knocks her down a flight of stairs in a fit of jealousy. Left penniless by the expenses she incurs during a long convalescence, Gloria is forced to rely on the kindness of busboy Augustus "Little Pinks" Pinkerton II, who invites her to stay with him in his apartment.

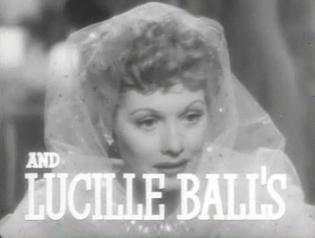
Lucille Ball in the film's trailer

When Pinks' friend Violette Shumberg marries Nicely Nicely Johnson and the couple moves to Florida, Gloria orders Pinks to take her there to recuperate and he pushes her to Miami in her wheelchair. There, she reunites with an old lover, Decatur Reed, who loses interest in her when he discovers she is an invalid. Angry, she lashes out at Pinks, who leaves her and finds work as a busboy in a club owned by Case, only to return when Violette tells him Gloria is ill.

Despondent, Gloria confesses she longs to spend one last night in a gown bedecked with jewels. When Pinks sees socialite Mimi Venus wearing one, he breaks into her home, where he overhears her being blackmailed by one of Case's thugs, who is threatening to publicize her infidelity unless she gives him her jewelry. Pinks disguises himself and retrieves the gems from the thief, then tells Case he will report him to the police unless he agrees to host a party with Gloria as the guest of honor.

On the night of the party, the police arrest Pinks, whose Social Security card was found in Mimi's closet. When Mimi's husband Samuel learns why Pinks had broken into their home, he takes pity on him and drops the charges. Gloria finally realizes the sacrifices Pinks made for her and he lifts her in his arms so they can dance. Gloria tells Pinks she wants to see the ocean, then dies. Undaunted, he carries her up the stairs to fulfill her final request.

== Cast ==
- Henry Fonda as Augustus "Little Pinks" Pinkerton II
- Lucille Ball as Gloria Lyons
- Barton MacLane as Case Ables
- Eugene Pallette as Nicely Nicely Johnson
- Agnes Moorehead as Violette Shumberg
- Marion Martin as Mimi Venus
- George Cleveland as Colonel Samuel Venus
- William T. Orr as Decatur Reed
- Ray Collins as Professor B
- Sam Levene as Horsethief
- Vera Gordon as Mrs. Lefkowitz
- Ozzie Nelson as Band Leader
- Hans Conried as Waiter (uncredited)
- Louise Beavers as Ruby (uncredited)

== Production ==
Damon Runyon originally wanted to cast Charles Laughton and Carole Lombard in the lead roles but neither one was interested in the project. Lombard suggested the producer consider her friend Lucille Ball and, despite pressure from RKO executives to hire a better-known actress, such as Barbara Stanwyck or Jean Arthur, Runyon offered her the role of Gloria Lyons. Ball later recalled that at the time she was cast, "nothing much seemed to be happening for me at the studio. My $1000 weekly paycheck came regularly, but I was still a regular among the Bs."

Filming did not go smoothly for Ball. Director Irving Reis was a novice, and co-star Henry Fonda, a former boyfriend on loan from 20th Century Fox, did not offer her much guidance. Fearing his wife might rekindle her relationship with Fonda, Desi Arnaz frequently lingered on the set. Despite these obstacles, Ball considered the film her favorite. The vocals for "Who Knows?" by Harry Revel and Mort Greene, performed by Gloria in Case Able’s (Barton MacLane's) Manhattan club, were provided by Martha Mears. Gloria later reprises the song with Ozzie Nelson and his orchestra in the Miami nightspot.

The character of Nicely Nicely Johnson (Eugene Pallette) appears in the Broadway musical Guys and Dolls, as well as the film starring Marlon Brando as Sky Masterson, in which Stubby Kaye portrays Nicely Nicely. Sam Levene provides comic relief in the role of Horsethief in The Big Street, an erudite gambler, a precursor to Levene's legendary stage performance as the "craps-shooter extraordinaire" Nathan Detroit in the 1950 original production of Guys and Dolls (1950), which ran for 1,200 performances on Broadway (Frank Sinatra played the part in the subsequent 1955 film version). Twenty-six years later, Fonda and Ball made one more movie together, Yours, Mine and Ours (1968), this time with Ball receiving top billing above Fonda in the wake of her triumphantly successful 1950s I Love Lucy comedic television series.

== Critical reception ==
The film critic for The New York Times called the film "smartly paced and colorful" and "crisply directed" but thought "in deviating occasionally from the plot's general comedy lines, the film over-dramatizes some none too plausible situations with an effect which is sometimes maudlin." He noted that Henry Fonda made "an acutely sympathetic hero opposite Miss Ball's able portrayal of the singer." Variety wrote that screenwriter Leonard Spigelgass did "a neat job of transferring the spirit of the piece to the screen, studding it with typical Runyon humor," and felt that Ball "[came] through with high laurels" and Henry Fonda was "at his best."

Time Out London wrote that the film "captures much of [Runyon's] low-life spirit and colorful vernacular, but occasionally spoils it all by wallowing in unnecessary sentimentality," and added, "Ball, in a rare straight role, is stunning." In Time in 1942, critic James Agee wrote, "The Big Street is a pleasant bit of paranoia that cannot possibly displease anyone ... This harmless charade has a certain honky-tonk charm ... There is the usual Runyon corps de ballet of ham-hearted grifters, heisters and passers played by a friendly crowd of veterans ... Pretty Lucille Ball, who was born for the parts Ginger Rogers sweats over, tackles her 'emotional' role as if it were sirloin and she didn't care who was looking."

== Home media ==
Turner Home Entertainment released the film on Region 1 DVD on June 19, 2007. It has an audio track in English with subtitles in English and French. Bonus features included the animated short The Hep Cat and the musical short Calling All Girls.
