= The Kiss (1958 film) =

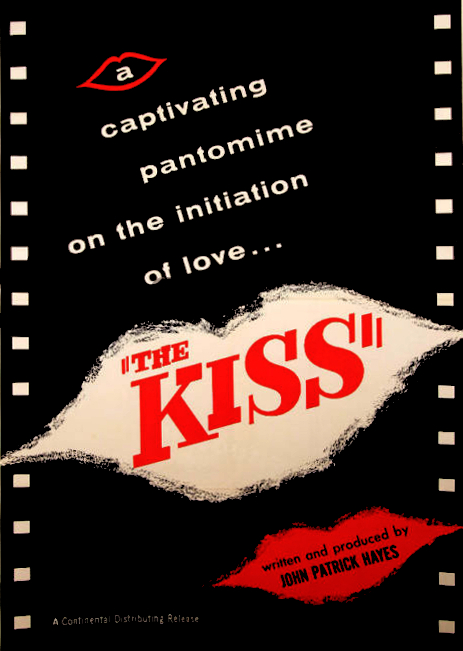
- Movie poster
- Directed by: Everett Chambers
- Written by: John Patrick Hayes
- Produced by: John Hayes
- Starring: David Brenner; Julie Reilly; Teddi Landess
- Edited by: Kenn Collins
- Music by: Michael Colicchio
- Production company: Cohay Productions
- Distributed by: Continental Distributing
- Release date: 1958 (U.S.)
- Running time: 29 minutes
- Country: United States
- Language: English

The Kiss is a 1958 short film written and produced by John Hayes. It was the first major film by Hayes, who would go on to find fame as the writer, producer, and director of B-movie genre films such as Garden of the Dead.

The film was nominated for the 1958 Academy Award for Best Live Action Short Film but lost to Disney's Grand Canyon.

== Plot ==
In New York, a young man feels isolated while others around him find romantic connections. He responds to a "lonely hearts" ad in the newspaper and meets an attractive woman. However, when she leans in for a kiss at the end of their date, he panics and leaves abruptly. Determined to improve, he reads an instructional manual called Art of Kissing and goes on another blind date from the lonely hearts ad, leading to unexpected outcomes.

== Cast ==
- David Brenner as Young Man
- Julie Reilly as 1st Date
- Teddi Landess as 2nd Date
- Jana Pearce as Girl on Beach
- William Guhl as Man in Bar
- Renée Taylor as Girl in Bar
- Madlyn Rhue as Girl in Park
- Suzanne Hahn as Female Necker
- John Astin as Male Necker
- Charles Creasap as Friend at Work
- Dorothy Heck as Friend of a Friend

== See also ==
- List of American films of 1958
