= Butch Minds the Baby =

1942 film directed by Albert S. Rogell

- Theatrical release poster
- Directed by: Albert S. Rogell
- Screenplay by: Leonard Spigelgass
- Based on: Butch Minds the Baby by Damon Runyon
- Produced by: Jules Levey
- Starring: Virginia Bruce; Broderick Crawford; Dick Foran; Porter Hall; Richard Lane; Shemp Howard
- Cinematography: Elwood Bredell
- Edited by: Milton Carruth
- Production companies: Universal Pictures; Mayfair Productions Inc.
- Distributed by: Universal Pictures
- Release date: March 20, 1942
- Running time: 75 minutes
- Country: United States
- Language: English

Butch Minds the Baby is a 1942 American comedy film directed by Albert S. Rogell and written by Leonard Spigelgass, based on the short story of the same name by Damon Runyon. The film stars Virginia Bruce, Broderick Crawford, Dick Foran, Porter Hall, Richard Lane and Shemp Howard. The film was released on March 20, 1942, by Universal Pictures.

== Plot ==
Aloysius 'Butch' Grogan is known for being involved with crime. He is motivated to continue being a criminal, in order to provide Susie O'Neill with the money so she can support herself and raise her son. Butch joins a gang of safe crackers as a lookout, but one of them brings his baby son along with him on the job. Butch has to keep the baby on his mind while the safe is being knocked over.

== Cast ==
- Virginia Bruce as Susie O'Neill
- Broderick Crawford as Aloysius 'Butch' Grogan
- Dick Foran as Dennis Devlin
- Porter Hall as Brandy Smith
- Richard Lane as Harry the Horse
- Shemp Howard as Blinky Sweeney
- Rosina Galli as Mrs. Talucci
- Joe King as Police Lieutenant
- Fuzzy Knight as Wyoming Bill
- Frank Moran as Jack the Beefer
- Grant Withers as Cactus Pete
- Russell Hicks as J. Wadsworth Carrington
- Tom Kennedy as Philly the Weeper
- Eddie Foster as Hot Horse Herbie
- Jimmy O'Gatty as Spanish John
- Pat McKee as Nathan Detroit
- Lou Lubin as Acey Deucey
- Charles Sullivan as Big Nig
- Spider McCoy as Henchman
- Al Bain as Henchman
- H. Michael Barnitz as The Baby
