= Christmas Lilies of the Field =

1979 film by Ralph Nelson

- Genre: Drama
- Written by: William E. Barrett; John McGreevey; Ralph Nelson
- Directed by: Ralph Nelson
- Starring: Billy Dee Williams; Maria Schell; Fay Hauser; Lisa Mann
- Music by: George Tipton
- Country of origin: United States
- Original language: English

Production
- Executive producer: Ralph Nelson
- Producers: Toby Martin; Jack N. Reddish
- Cinematography: Robert B. Hauser
- Editor: O. Nicholas Brown
- Running time: 100 min.
- Production company: Osmond Productions

Original release
- Network: NBC
- Release: December 16, 1979

Christmas Lilies of the Field is a 1979 made-for-TV sequel to the classic 1963 film Lilies of the Field. In this sequel, directed by Ralph Nelson (his final project before his death), Homer Smith (played by Billy Dee Williams instead of Sidney Poitier) returns to the Arizona desert where he had built the chapel for the nuns. This time, Mother Maria (played by Maria Schell) convinces Homer Smith into building a kindergarten as well as an orphanage by claiming that, since the chapel lacks a bell-tower and bells, the previous job was never completed.

== Cast ==
- Billy Dee Williams as Homer Smith
- Maria Schell as Mother Maria
- Fay Hauser as Janet Owens
- Lisa Mann as Sister Gertrude
- Hanna Hertelendy as Sister Albertine
- Judith Piquet as Sister Agnes
- Donna Johnston as Sister Elizabeth
- Robert Hastings as Harold Pruitt
- Fred Hart as Father Brian Connor
- Oliver Nguyen as Trang (orphan)
- Rachel Ward as Jenny

== Production ==
Parts of the film were shot in Salt Lake City and Orem, Utah. The TV special was released on VHS in 1989.
