= The Troubleshooters (American TV series) =

- Genre: Adventure
- Starring: Keenan Wynn; Bob Mathias; Robert Fortier
- Country of origin: United States
- Original language: English
- No. of seasons: 1
- No. of episodes: 26

Production
- Producers: Frank P. Rosenberg; John Gibbs
- Running time: ca. 25 mins.
- Production companies: Meridian Productions; United Artists Television

Original release
- Network: NBC
- Release: September 11, 1959 – April 1, 1960

The Troubleshooters is an American adventure television series about a construction team that takes on difficult jobs around the world. It stars Keenan Wynn, Bob Mathias and Robert Fortier and aired on NBC beginning on September 11, 1959.

== Synopsis ==
Kodiak is a construction engineer who for five years has served as the chief troubleshooter for the Stenrud Corporation, a heavy construction firm. The work has taken him throughout the United States and around the world to solve difficult problems that crop up in construction projects ranging from highways to dams to skyscrapers to airports to nuclear facilities. The pace of the work has begun to wear on him, and he has begun a slow program of training his assistant, construction engineer Frank Dugan, to replace him eventually. The two men are very different: Kodiak is an older, grizzled, gruff, and brawny veteran of construction work, while Dugan is young, more socially adept, well-educated, soft-spoken, and innocent. As they travel around the United States and the world to troubleshoot problems on construction sites, they learn from one another: Kodiak becomes more civil and Dugan gets stronger and more assertive. Scotty, Skinner, Jim, and Slats are members of their construction crew who frequently work with them on their projects.

== Cast ==
- Keenan Wynn as Kodiak
- Bob Mathias as Frank Dugan
- Robert Fortier as Scotty
- Carey Loftin as Skinner
- Bob Harris as Jim
- Chet Allen as Slats

== Production ==
The Troubleshooters was a Meridian Productions-United Artists Television production, the first network television show produced by United Artists. Episodes were filmed by Filmaster Productions, Incorporated, at Republic Studios in Studio City, California. Frank P. Rosenberg and John Gibbs produced the series, and Robert Altman was among its episode directors.

== Broadcast history ==
The Troubleshooters premiered on September 11, 1959, and 26 episodes were produced. It aired on NBC on Fridays at 8:00 p.m. Eastern Time. The show was cancelled after a single season, and its last new episode was broadcast on April 1, 1960. Prime-time reruns of The Troubleshooters then aired in its regular time slot until June 17, 1960.

== Episodes ==
No.	Title	Original release date
1	"Liquid Death"	September 11, 1959
Kodiak and Dugan face a landslide and challenges from indigenous people as they travel through the mountains of Venezuela to deliver supplies. Guest stars: Abel Fernandez and Eddie Firestone.
2	"Disaster"	September 18, 1959
Alternative title "The Law and the Profits." During the construction of a tunnel on a storage farm in California, Kodiak fires a young college student working a summer job for being drunk at work. A fistfight ensues in which Kodiak flattens the young man, who subsequently files an injury claim. Guest stars: Peter Miller, Dabbs Greer, and Dennis Cross.
3	"The Widow of Elbow Bend"	September 25, 1959
Alternative titles "The Widow at Elbow Bend" and "Trouble at Elbow Bend." While building a highway, Kodiak's crew encounters an elderly woman who is armed with a rifle and is an excellent shot, and Kodiak must figure out a way to deal with her. Guest stars: Jeanette Nolan, Ken Clark, Jack Herrin, and Stafford Repp.
4	"The Lower Depths"	October 2, 1959
Dugan hires an underwater foreman in Kodiak′s absence — but the man is ill, and his poor health could lead to disaster. Guest stars: Norbert Schiller, Suzanne Lloyd, and Wayne Morris.
5	"Tiger Culhane"	October 9, 1959
A man who is a construction worker during the day and a boxer at night joins the construction crew and causes trouble among the men. Guest stars: Dan Blocker, James Westerfield, Charles Horvath, and Owen Bush.
6	"Moment of Terror"	October 16, 1959
During the construction of a hydroelectric plant in the Pacific Northwest, escaped convicts kidnap Kodiak and place the town in danger. Guest stars: Harry Townes, Rayford Barnes, Harry Bartell, and Abby Shelton.
7	"Gino"	October 23, 1959
While trying pull off the theft of the company payroll, a construction worker goes to great lengths to frame a young motorcycle thief for the crime. Guest stars: Marc Cavell and John Larch.
8	"Pipeline"	November 6, 1959
The construction crew encounters difficulties while laying a pipeline in a Middle Eastern country when local rebels plot to assassinate the country′s king. Guest stars: Ruta Lee, Eugene Iglesias, and Jason Wingreen.
9	"Trapped"	November 13, 1959
Kodiak and Dugan have only a short time to save a boy trapped in a deep crevice. Guest stars: Elisha Cook, Bryan Russell, Dee Pollock, and Anne Benton.
10	"Downrange"	November 20, 1959
The corporation sends Kodiak to speed up a construction project on a missile range, but after arriving he finds that the project foreman is more interested in pursuing a romantic relationship with a woman than with work. Some sources claim this episode was broadcast on November 27, 1959. Guest stars: Charles McGraw, Noreen Nash, Patricia Crest, and Forrest Compton.
11	"The Big Squeeze"	November 27, 1959
While constructing a dam in Canada, the crew becomes involved in a controversy between a religious sect that wants the dam and farmers who do not. Some sources claim this episode was broadcast on November 20, 1959. Guest stars: Forrest Compton, Judy Crowder, Gregory Morton, Alan Reed, Jr., Paul Sorensen, and Edgar Stehli.
12	"Tunnel to Yesterday Ray Bradbury"	December 4, 1959
During a drilling project in Bavaria, Kodiak discovers an underground fortress inhabited by Germans who do not know that World War II has ended. Guest stars: Werner Klemperer, Erika Peters, and Albert Szabo.
13	"The Chain"	December 11, 1959
After Dugan learns that the crew has inadvertently begun construction on private property without permission, he must reach a settlement with the owners — and it could be costly. Guest stars: Rebecca Welles, Charles Boaz, and Wayne Tucker.
14	"Trouble at the Orphanage ."	December 25, 1959
Alternative title "Swing Shift." While in Greece on a construction job, Kodiak investigates a minor theft. His investigation leads him to an orphanage whose fresh water has been cut off, so he decides to intercede and build a well for the orphans. Guest stars: Fintan Meyler and Bart Bradley.
15	"The Mountain That Moved"	January 1, 1960
The United States Government and the Government of Canada have agreed to work together on a huge oil exploration project which will require the detonation of an atomic bomb. During construction of a tunnel in which the bomb will detonate, a religious zealot calling himself "the savior of the world" brings the work to a halt, and Kodiak and Dugan are sent to the site to deal with him. Guest star: Abraham Sofaer.
16	"High Steel"	January 15, 1960
A member of a Native American tribe known for the ability of its men to work without fear on tall buildings faces the challenge of acrophobia — and worries that he may suffer more than just a wound to his pride. Guest stars: Marc Lawrence and Francy Scott.
17	"Harry Maru"	January 22, 1960
A Japanese deserter is determined to sabotage Kodiak's construction project. Guest stars: Howard Caine and James Shigeta.
18	"The Big Blaze"	January 29, 1960
While Kodiak is developing an oil field for the ruler of a country in South America, he is forced to take rebels prisoner when they interfere with the project. In response, the rebel forces kidnap Kodiak. Guest stars: Chana Eden and Perry Lopez.
19	"Headhunter Road"	February 12, 1960
Headhunters interrupt a road construction project in an East Asian jungle. Guest stars: Joseph Ruskin, Frank de Kova, Nina Martinez, and Manning Ross.
20	"The Town That Wouldn't Die"	February 19, 1960
After living in a small town by the Mississippi River for two years during a construction job, construction workers and their families decide they want to settle down there permanently. They need protection from floods, however, so they ask Kodiak to let them use the company's equipment to build levees. Guest stars: Ken Lynch, Charles Aidman, and Lillian Buyeff.
21	"Incident at Rain Mountain"	February 26, 1960
Against Kodiak's orders, Dugan joins the search for the survivor of a plane crash. Guest stars: Madlyn Rhue, Sam Gilman, Anne Loos, and Tom Palmer.
22	"Senorita"	March 4, 1960
Kodiak travels in the highlands of Central America on a burro that turns out to be more trouble than expected and makes the journey even more arduous. Guest stars: Al Ruscio, Rene Kroper, and Julian Rivero.
23	"The Landmark"	March 11, 1960
An American Civil War monument lies in the path of Kodiak's and Dugan's road construction job. Guest stars: Louise Fletcher, Ron Hayes, and Renny McEvoy.
24	"No Stone Unturned"	March 18, 1960
Kodiak and Dugan travel to South Vietnam to intervene after a stranger harasses natives working on a flood control project. Some sources claim this episode was broadcast on March 25, 1960. Guest star: Jacques Aubuchon.
25	"Fire in the Hole"	March 25, 1960
Kodiak's and Dugan's effort to rescue miners trapped by a cave-in turns into a contest of brains against brawn. Some sources claim this episode was broadcast on March 18, 1960. Guest stars: Rhys Williams and Joan Vohs.
26	"The Cat-Skinner"	April 1, 1960
Alternative title "The Carnival." An accident occurs on a construction site, imperiling plans to hold a benefit for a disabled child. Guest stars: Richard Eyer, Edgar Buchanan, and Lou Krugman.
