= A Majority of One =

1959 play by Leonard Spigelgass

A Majority of One is a play by Leonard Spigelgass. The 1958-59 Broadway production was directed by Dore Schary and ran for three previews and 556 performances, with Gertrude Berg, Cedric Hardwicke, and Ina Balin.

== Plot ==
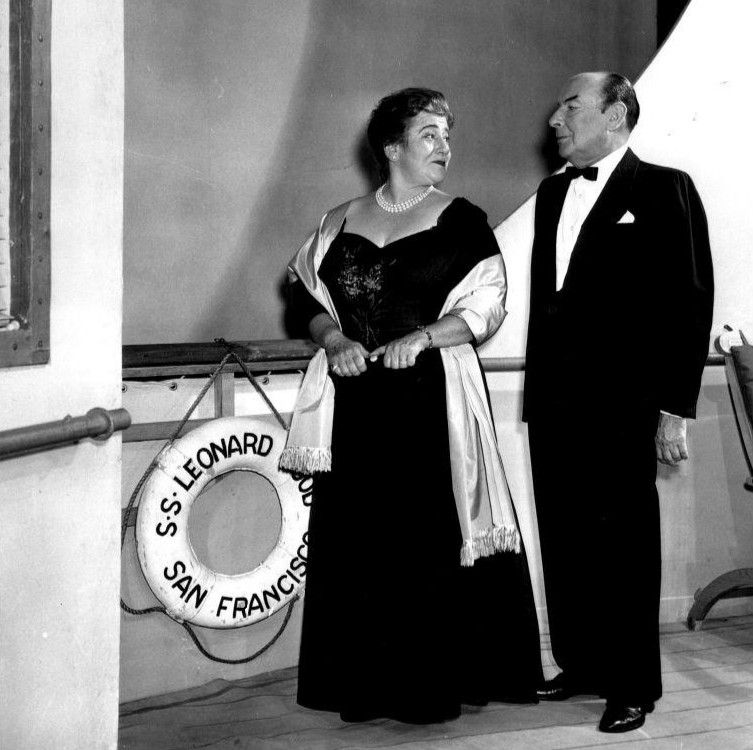
Gertrude Berg and Cedric Hardwicke in a scene from the play

The play is a comedy concerning racial prejudice involving Mrs. Jacoby, a Jewish widow from Brooklyn, New York, and Koichi Asano, a millionaire widower from Tokyo. Mrs. Jacoby is sailing to Japan with her daughter and foreign service officer son-in-law who is being posted to the U.S. Embassy in Tokyo. She still considers the country the enemy responsible for the death of her son during World War II, but her feelings change when she meets Mr. Asano on board the ship. When she advises her family of Mr. Asano's desire to court her, Mrs. Jacoby's daughter, whose loyalty is to her mother rather than her husband, objects to the possibility of an interracial marriage.

== Awards and nominations ==
- Tony Award for Best Actor in Play (Cedric Hardwicke, nominee)
- Tony Award for Best Actress in a Play (Gertrude Berg, winner)
- Tony Award for Best Scenic Design (Donald Oenslager, winner)
- Tony Award for Best Direction (Dore Schary, nominee)
- Theatre World Award (Ina Balin, winner)

== Adaptation ==
Video cover of A Majority of One (1961)

In 1961, Spigelgass adapted his play into a film, produced by Warner Bros. and directed by Mervyn LeRoy, starring Rosalind Russell, Alec Guinness, Madlyn Rhue and Ray Danton.

=== Awards and nominations ===
- Academy Award for Best Color Cinematography (Harry Stradling, nominee)
- Directors Guild of America Award for Outstanding Directorial Achievement in Motion Pictures (Mervyn LeRoy, nominee)
- Golden Globe Award for Best Film Promoting International Understanding (winner)
- Golden Globe for Best Motion Picture - Musical/Comedy (winner)
- Golden Globe for Best Motion Picture Actress - Musical/Comedy (Rosalind Russell, winner)
- Writers Guild of America Award for Best Written American Comedy (Leonard Spigelgass, nominee)
