= Lilies of the Field (1963 film) =

American comedy drama by Ralph Nelson

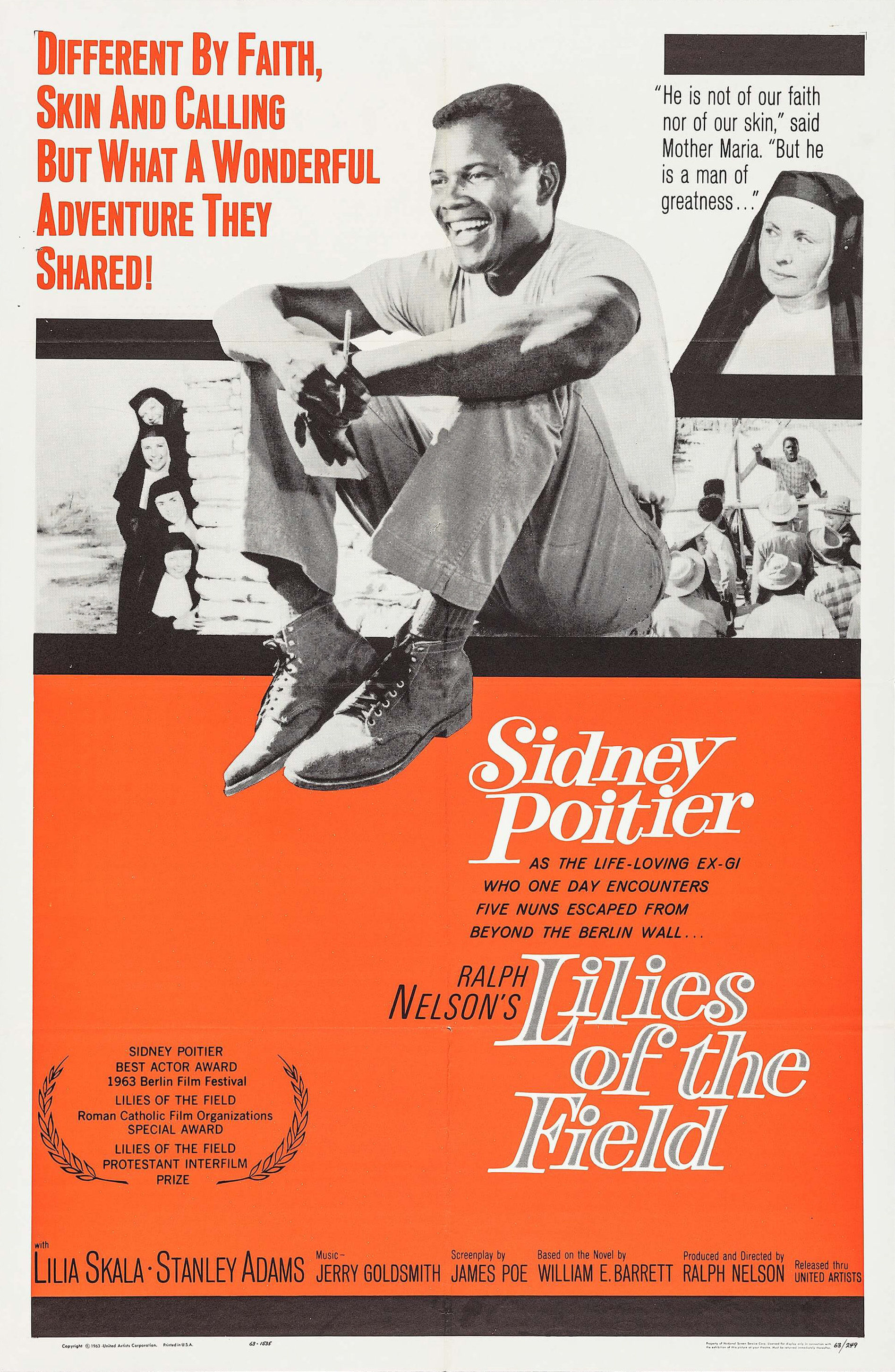
- Theatrical release poster
- Directed by: Ralph Nelson
- Screenplay by: James Poe
- Based on: The Lilies of the Field by William E. Barrett
- Produced by: Ralph Nelson
- Starring: Sidney Poitier; Lilia Skala; Stanley Adams
- Cinematography: Ernest Haller
- Edited by: John McCafferty
- Music by: Jerry Goldsmith
- Production company: Rainbow Productions
- Distributed by: United Artists
- Release dates: June 1963 (Berlin Film Festival); October 3, 1963 (New York)
- Running time: 94 minutes
- Country: United States
- Languages: English; German
- Budget: $240,000–247,000
- Box office: $3 million (rentals) or $7 million

Lilies of the Field is a 1963 American comedy drama film directed and produced by Ralph Nelson. Adapted by James Poe from William E. Barrett's 1962 novel, the film takes its title from the Sermon on the Mount. It stars Sidney Poitier as Homer Smith, an itinerant handyman, who encounters a group of East German nuns in the Arizona desert. Led by the determined Mother Maria Marthe, played by Lilia Skala, the nuns believe Homer has been sent by God to build them a chapel.

Praised by critics, Lilies of the Field earned five Academy Award nominations, including Best Picture and Best Supporting Actress for Skala. Poitier won the Academy Award for Best Actor, becoming the first Black actor to win in a leading role. The film also features an early score by Jerry Goldsmith. In 2020, it was selected for preservation in the United States National Film Registry by the Library of Congress as being "culturally, historically, or aesthetically significant".

== Plot ==
Homer Smith, a drifting handyman, stops at a remote Arizona farm seeking water for his car. He encounters a group of nuns from East Germany—led by the stern Mother Maria Marthe—struggling to maintain their modest desert homestead. Though initially resistant, Homer agrees to repair their roof. The nuns, who speak little English, humorously dub him "Schmidt" (the German equivalent of Smith), slowly endearing themselves to him.

Through interactions with locals, including Juan, a café owner, and a traveling priest, Homer learns of the nuns' harrowing escape from behind the Iron Curtain and their impoverished existence. Despite their inability to pay, he begrudgingly prolongs his stay, lured by the challenge of building a chapel for the nearby Mexican American community.

Homer's initial reluctance gives way to ambition when he confesses his unrealized dream of becoming an architect. Using donated materials and his dwindling savings, he begins constructing the chapel single-handedly, insisting on perfection. Tensions flare with Mother Maria, who prioritizes pragmatism over his ideals, leading Homer to abandon the project temporarily. He returns hung over but remorseful, finding renewed purpose as the community gradually rallies to assist. Locals donate supplies and labor, transforming Homer's solitary endeavor into a collective effort, though he initially resists their involvement.

As construction progresses, Homer's leadership earns respect, even from Ashton, a dismissive contractor who later offers him a job. The chapel's completion culminates in a bittersweet victory: Homer secretly signs his work, symbolizing pride and humility.

On the eve of the dedication, Mother Maria subtly implores him to stay, but Homer departs quietly at nightfall. The nuns’ echoing rendition of “Amen"—a hymn they learned from him—underscores their unspoken gratitude as he drives away.

== Cast ==
- Sidney Poitier as Homer Smith
- Lilia Skala as Mother Maria
- Lisa Mann as Sister Gertrude
- Isa Crino as Sister Agnes
- Francesca Jarvis as Sister Albertine
- Pamela Branch as Sister Elizabeth
- Stanley Adams as Juan Acalito
- Dan Frazer as Father Murphy
- Jester Hairston as Homer Smith Singing (uncredited); composer of the song "Amen"
- Ralph Nelson as Mr. Ashton (uncredited)

== Production ==
Lilies of the Field was filmed primarily on a ranch owned by the family of Linda Ronstadt, located on the northern edge of Tucson, near Sabino Canyon and Cloud Road. The church doors featured in the film were borrowed from the Chapel in Sasabe, Arizona, and were carved by local Tucson artist Charles Bolsius.

Jester Hairston, who wrote the gospel arrangement of "Amen" used in the film and arranged the vocal parts, also dubbed the vocals for Sidney Poitier, who was tone-deaf.

== Release ==
Lilies of the Field was screened in competition at the 1963 Berlin Film Festival in June 1963. It opened October 3, 1963 at the Murray Hill Theater in New York City.

== Reception ==
On the review aggregator website Rotten Tomatoes, 92% of 26 critics' reviews are positive, with an average rating of 8.1/10. The website's consensus reads: "Sidney Poitier lends heart and humor to the wonderfully simple Lilies of the Field, in which splendor sprouts from wholesome soil." Metacritic, which uses a weighted average, assigned the film a score of 68 out of 100, based on nine critics, indicating "generally favorable" reviews. Variety said it was a film "loaded with charm and which is full of good, clean, honest fun."

=== Accolades ===
Award	Category	Nominee(s)	Result	Ref.
Academy Awards	Best Picture	Ralph Nelson	Nominated	
Academy Awards	Best Actor	Sidney Poitier	Won	
Academy Awards	Best Supporting Actress	Lilia Skala	Nominated	
Academy Awards	Best Screenplay – Based on Material from Another Medium	James Poe	Nominated	
Academy Awards	Best Cinematography – Black-and-White	Ernest Haller	Nominated	
Berlin International Film Festival	Golden Bear	Ralph Nelson	Nominated	
Berlin International Film Festival	Interfilm Award	Ralph Nelson	Won	
Berlin International Film Festival	OCIC Award	Ralph Nelson	Won	
Berlin International Film Festival	Youth Film Award – Honorable Mention	Ralph Nelson	Won	
Berlin International Film Festival	Best Actor	Sidney Poitier	Won	
Blue Ribbon Awards	Best Foreign Language Film	Ralph Nelson	Won	
British Academy Film Awards	Best Foreign Actor	Sidney Poitier	Nominated	
British Academy Film Awards	United Nations Award		Nominated	
Directors Guild of America Awards	Outstanding Directorial Achievement in Motion Pictures	Ralph Nelson	Nominated	
Golden Globe Awards	Best Motion Picture – Drama		Nominated	
Golden Globe Awards	Best Actor in a Motion Picture – Drama	Sidney Poitier	Won	
Golden Globe Awards	Best Supporting Actress – Motion Picture	Lilia Skala	Nominated	
Golden Globe Awards	Best Film Promoting International Understanding		Won	
Laurel Awards	Top General Entertainment		Won	
Laurel Awards	Top Male Dramatic Performance	Sidney Poitier	Nominated	
Laurel Awards	Top Female Supporting Performance	Lilia Skala	Nominated	
National Board of Review Awards	Top Ten Films		2nd place	
New York Film Critics Circle Awards	Best Actor	Sidney Poitier	Nominated	
Writers Guild of America Awards	Best Written American Comedy	James Poe	Won	

Sidney Poitier became the first African-American actor to win the Academy Award for Best Actor and the second African-American Oscar winner overall (after Hattie McDaniel won the Academy Award for Best Supporting Actress for Gone with the Wind in 1939). (Note: James Baskett won an Honorary Academy Award for Song of the South (1946); it was not competitive.)

Also, the film is recognized by American Film Institute in these lists:

- 2003: AFI's 100 Years...100 Heroes & Villains:
  - Homer Smith – Nominated Hero
- 2006: AFI's 100 Years...100 Cheers – No. 46

== Sequel ==
The sequel Christmas Lilies of the Field was made in 1979 for television in which Homer Smith (now played by Billy Dee Williams), returns and is "persuaded" to build a kindergarten for a group of orphans and runaways whom the sisters have taken in.

== See also ==
- List of American films of 1963
- Loretto Chapel
