= The Left Hand of God =

1955 drama film directed by Edward Dmytryk

- Original film poster
- Directed by: Edward Dmytryk
- Screenplay by: Alfred Hayes
- Based on: The Left Hand of God by William Edmund Barrett
- Produced by: Buddy Adler
- Starring: Humphrey Bogart; Gene Tierney; Lee J. Cobb
- Cinematography: Franz Planer
- Edited by: Dorothy Spencer
- Music by: Victor Young
- Color process: Color by DeLuxe
- Production company: 20th Century Fox
- Distributed by: 20th Century Fox
- Release date: September 2, 1955 (Los Angeles)
- Running time: 87 minutes
- Country: United States
- Language: English
- Budget: $1,785,000
- Box office: $4 million (US)

The Left Hand of God is a 1955 American drama film. It was directed by Edward Dmytryk and produced by Buddy Adler, from a screenplay by Alfred Hayes, based on the novel The Left Hand of God, by William Edmund Barrett.

Set in a small American mission in China in 1947, at the time of the Chinese Civil War, it stars Humphrey Bogart as a hunted man masquerading as a Catholic priest and Gene Tierney in the role of a nurse, with a supporting cast including Lee J. Cobb, Agnes Moorehead, E. G. Marshall, and Carl Benton Reid.

While playing Anne Scott, Tierney became ill. Bogart had a personal experience as he was close to a sister who suffered from mental illness, and, during the production, he fed Tierney her lines and encouraged her to seek help.

== Plot ==
In 1947 Catholic priest Father O'Shea makes his way to a remote mission in China to replace a priest who had been killed there. He meets Dr David Sigman, Sigman's wife Beryl, and nurse Anne Scott, the only other Western residents. They run a hospital for the surrounding villagers, at a time when competing warlords and communists are engaged in civil war.

O'Shea delivers his debut Sunday sermon, in both English and Chinese for appreciative parishioners. His work among them, and his observance of local customs, soon earn him their respect.

Anne becomes uncomfortable as she is romantically attracted to him. Beryl suggests to her husband that Anne be sent back to the United States, but he refuses to consider it, needing her at the hospital. Beryl suggests that O'Shea consult with Reverend Martin, a Protestant minister at another American mission, for advice. He agrees.

When O'Shea meets Martin, O'Shea makes a startling, unsolicited confession. He says he is not a Catholic priest, but Jim Carmody, an American pilot who had flown supplies over The Hump during World War II. He crashed during the war and was rescued by a local warlord, General Yang, becoming his trusted second-in-command and his prisoner. When one of Yang's soldiers killed Father O'Shea, Carmody deserted and decided to masquerade as the replacement priest. After recounting his story to Martin, Carmody writes a full account to the Catholic bishop.

General Yang tracks down Carmody, bringing an army and insisting that Carmody resume serving him. Carmody proposes they settle the matter with their customary game of dice, wagering five years' loyal service against his freedom and the safety of the local villagers. After Yang loses, he coerces Carmody into playing again, this time for the future of the Protestant mission. When he loses again, Yang resigns himself to perpetuating the myth of Father O'Shea, who is saintly enough to turn aside a powerful warlord.

Before Carmody leaves the mission, to the regret of all the villagers, he tells Anne the truth.

== Cast ==
- Humphrey Bogart as James Carmody
- Gene Tierney as Anne Scott
- Lee J. Cobb as Mieh Yang
- Agnes Moorehead as Beryl Sigman
- E. G. Marshall as Dr. David Sigman
- Jean Porter as Mary Yin
- Carl Benton Reid as Father Cornelius
- Victor Sen Yung as John Wong
- Philip Ahn as Jan Teng
- Benson Fong as Chun Tien

== Reception ==
Bosley Crowther of The New York Times disliked the picture, writing, "Unfortunately, Mr. Hayes and Mr. Dmytryk have not assembled a drama that conveys either credibility of action or sincerity of mood," calling the flashback scenes "absurd, played in a style of heroics that you get in the silliest bandit films." Variety praised the film's "top-budget values" and "authentic touch" of Chinese extras, but noted, "To sticklers of logic and realism, there are a number of scenes and incidents that strain the imagination. Particularly the tense sequence in which Bogart actually wins the village's freedom by casting dice with Cobb." Harrison's Reports agreed that the dice game was "rather fanciful", but called the film's production values "first-rate" and thought that Bogart did "an outstanding job" in the lead role. John McCarten of The New Yorker deemed the film "a fairly substantial item" in a positive review, with Bogart doing "a fine job" in his estimation though he found the plot to get "a bit shaky, and even outlandish." Richard L. Coe of The Washington Post wrote that Bogart was "far more sure of the part than the writers, director and producer seem to be about the rest of the picture." The Monthly Film Bulletin wrote: "Obscure character motivation and an unpleasant mock religiosity in the worst Hollywood tradition are the main drawbacks in this curious picture. One suspects that the original novel may have provided more detailed and logical characterisation than is apparent in the film's script—Carmody's allegiance to the Chinese warlord is never satisfactorily explained—and Bogart's tired and uneasy playing fails to suggest the character's dilemma."

== See also ==
- List of American films of 1955
