= Madlyn Rhue =

American actress (1935–2003)

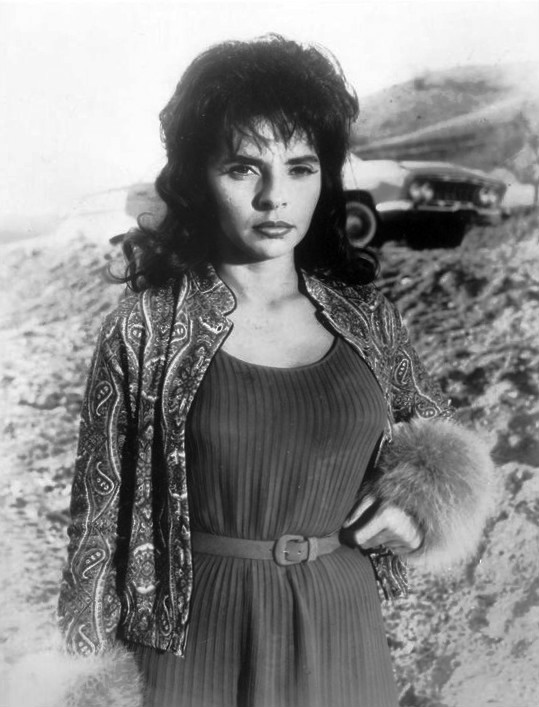
- Rhue in 1961
- Born: Madeline Roche; October 3, 1935; Washington, D.C., U.S.
- Died: December 16, 2003 (aged 68); Los Angeles, California, U.S.
- Occupation: Actress
- Years active: 1958–1996
- Known for: Space Seed; Fame
- Spouse: Tony Young (m. 1962; div. 1970)

Madlyn Soloman Rhue (née Madeline Roche; October 3, 1935 – December 16, 2003) was an American film and television actress.

== Early life and education ==
Rhue was born in Washington, D.C., graduated from Los Angeles High School, and studied drama at Los Angeles City College.

== Entertainment career ==
Rhue debuted in show business at age 17 as a dancer at the Copacabana night club in New York City. At that time she decided to create a stage name for herself by adapting the title of the film 13 Rue Madeleine (1947). From the 1950s to the 1990s, she appeared in some 20 films, including Operation Petticoat (1959); The Ladies Man (1961); A Majority of One (1961); It's a Mad, Mad, Mad, Mad World (1963); Kenner (1969); and Stand Up and Be Counted (1972).

Rhue guest-starred in dozens of television series, beginning with Cheyenne (1955). She played Ricardo Montalbán's wife in a 1960 episode of Bonanza, "Day of Reckoning". That year, she also played the title role of Marian Ames in the Perry Mason episode "The Case of the Wayward Wife" and appeared in Route 66 Season 3 Episode 9.

Later in the 1960s, her appearances included Stagecoach West (1961), Rawhide (1963), The Defenders (1965) in "Whipping Boy" as Christine Knox and the classic Star Trek episode "Space Seed" (1967) where she once again appeared opposite Ricardo Montalbán (who played Khan Noonien Singh) playing his love interest Lt. Marla McGivers.

Rhue played regulars Marjorie Grant in Bracken's World (1969–70) and Hilary Madison in Executive Suite (1976–77). Other guest appearances included Have Gun – Will Travel, Gunsmoke (S5E15, "Tag You're It"), The Alfred Hitchcock Hour (as Consuela Sandino in episode "The Dark Pool"), Route 66 (as Ara Rados in the episode, "Every Father's Daughter"), The Untouchables, The Rebel, Perry Mason, The Man from U.N.C.L.E., The Fugitive, Ironside, The Wild Wild West, Mannix, Hawaii Five-O, Land of the Giants, Mission: Impossible, Longstreet, Fantasy Island, Charlie's Angels (as Georgia in "Angels on the Street" in 1979) and Fame (as Angela Schwartz). She also appeared in the television movie Goldie and the Boxer, and made appearances on the game show Match Game during 1974–1976.

In the early 1960s, Rhue was injured in an automobile accident that resulted in lost teeth and a cut lower lip. She was hospitalized before returning to acting.

In 1962, Rhue married actor Tony Young and acted with him in the Western He Rides Tall. They divorced in 1970.

=== Multiple sclerosis and later entertainment career ===
In 1977, Rhue was diagnosed with multiple sclerosis. She continued to work, including a role in Days of Our Lives, but by 1985, Rhue's legs had become so weak that she could only get around by wheelchair. Rhue described her fear and anxiety after being unable to land on-screen work in the entertainment industry for a period of 11 months. She said, "It became apparent that I would have to invent a giant accident to explain the wheelchair or start telling the truth."

Rhue managed to resume her career and was praised by media outlets for not allowing her health issues to hold her back. She played intermittent roles that did not require her to walk or stand, sometimes incorporating the wheelchair as part of the character. For example, she played a wheelchair-using ballistics expert on the CBS police-based legal drama, Houston Knights. She also played a judge in the scripted court show, Trial by Jury, lasting only the 1989–90 television season. She performed the role in a wheelchair, unseen by viewers behind the judge's bench. Her casting was uncharacteristic for court shows, a genre dominated by male actors previously. She also performed a recurring role in Murder, She Wrote, said to be her last television role. Angela Lansbury created a role for her when she heard that Rhue was at risk of losing her health insurance because she could no longer work enough hours.

Contrary to rumors, her illness had nothing to do with her not reprising the Star Trek role of Lt. Marla McGivers in the film Star Trek II: The Wrath of Khan (1982). At the time of the film's production start in late 1981, Rhue was still mobile and appearing in television roles, but hiding her diagnosis for fear of it impacting her career. Director Nicholas Meyer stated that he wrote McGivers out of his drafts of the film (with a line referencing the character's death) in order to give the Khan character additional motivation for seeking vengeance.

In 1991, she played a wheelchair-using character in her last film role, the made for television thriller A Mother's Justice.

== Death ==
Rhue eventually became completely incapacitated by multiple sclerosis and died from pneumonia in 2003 at the age of 68 at the Motion Picture & Television Country House and Hospital in Woodland Hills in Los Angeles, California.

== Religion and politics ==
Rhue adhered to Judaism except during her marriage to Young, during which she practiced Catholicism. She was a registered Republican who supported the administrations of Gerald Ford, Ronald Reagan, and George H. W. Bush.

== Filmography ==
=== Film ===
Year	Title	Role	Notes
1958	The Kiss	Girl in Park	Short
1959	The Miracle	Nun who warns Teresa about her singing love songs	Uncredited
1959	Operation Petticoat	Lieutenant Reid, NC, USAR	
1961	The Ladies Man	Miss Intellect	
1961	A Majority of One	Alice Black	
1962	Escape from Zahrain	Laila	
1963	It's a Mad, Mad, Mad, Mad World	Secretary Schwartz	
1964	He Rides Tall	Ellie Daniels	
1969	Kenner	Anasuya	
1972	Stand Up and Be Counted	Gloria Seagar	

=== Television ===
Year	Title	Role	Notes
1958	The Court of Last Resort	Janice Lowell	S1:E22, "The Stephen Lowell Case"
1958	Whirlybirds	Phyllis Bolling	Season 2 Episode 10: "Seven Orchids"
1958–1959	Have Gun - Will Travel	Jean Nelson / Elizabeth DeVries	2 episodes
1959	Mike Hammer	Linda	Season 2 Episode 5: "Aces and Eights"
1959	The Third Man	Hassani	Season 1 Episode 20: "Five Hours to Kill"
1959	Black Saddle	Julie Reynolds	Season 1 Episode 19: "Client: Reynolds"
1959	M Squad	Loretta Danzig	Season 2 Episode 40: "Death Is a Clock"
1959	Riverboat	Cassie Baird	S1:E3, "About Roger Mowbray"
1959	Cheyenne	Ellen Lassiter	S4:E6, "Prisoner of Moon Mesa"
1959	Tightrope!	Judy Brannen	Season 1 Episode 10: "The Money Fight"
1959	The Rebel	Beth Lassiter	Season 1 Episode 10: "In Memoriam"
1959	Tales of Wells Fargo	Linda	Season 4 Episode 13: "Woman with a Gun"
1959	Gunsmoke	Rusty	Season 5 Episode 15: "Tag, You're It"
1959	Laramie	Eve	Season 1 Episode 16: "The Pass"
1959	Special Agent 7	Mary	Season 1 Episode 10: "The Trap"
1959–1960	Bourbon Street Beat	Lenore Lamartine / Nita Roulas	2 episodes
1960	Hotel de Paree	Sarah Carter	S1:E15, "Sundance Goes To Kill"
1960	Perry Mason	Marian Ames	Season 3 Episode 13: "The Case of the Wayward Wife"
1960	The Troubleshooters	Rhoda Spencer	S1:E21, "Incident at Rain Mountain"
1960	The Alaskans	Fay Loomis	Season 1 Episode 24: "Disaster at Gold Hill"
1960	Pony Express	Ellen Fairchild	Season 1 Episode 3: "The Last Mile"
1960	Outlaws	Rose Dabney	Season 1 Episode 2: "Ballad for a Badman"
1960	Michael Shayne	Agnes Musgrave	Season 1 Episode 2: "A Night with Nora"
1960	The Roaring 20's	Julie Fiore	Season 1 Episode 1: "Burnett's Woman"
1960	Bonanza	Hatoya	Season 2 Episode 7: "Day of Reckoning"
1960	Sugarfoot	Nora Sutton	Season 4 Episode 2: "A Noose for Nora"
1960	Hong Kong	Lola	Season 1 Episode 5: "The Jade Empress"
1960	Checkmate	Irene Thorne	Season 1 Episode 7: "Target: Tycoon"
1960	General Electric Theater	Deborah	S9:E14, "The Other Wise Man"
1960	The Untouchables	Chickie Bernstein / Sally Karpeles	2 episodes
1960	The Westerner	Carla	Season 1 Episode 13: "The Painting"
1961	Stagecoach West	Maria Lorenz	S1:E26, "Fort Wyatt Crossing"
1961	Adventures in Paradise	Sherry Drake	Season 3 Episode 9: "The Assassins"
1961	Bus Stop	Gloria White	Season 1 Episode 14: "Jaws of Darkness"
1962	Cain's Hundred	Margarita Safa	Season 1 Episode 28: "Women of Silure"
1962	Route 66	Ara Rados	S3:E9, "Every Father's Daughter"
1963	The Nurses	Rhoda Green	Season 1 Episode 24: "A Question of Mercy"
1963	77 Sunset Strip	Mrs. Knight	Season 5 Episode 25: "Flight 307"
1963	The Alfred Hitchcock Hour	Consuela Sandino	Season 1 Episode 29: "The Dark Pool"
1963	Rawhide	Inez Maldenado	S5:E29, "Incident at Rio Doloroso"
1963	Kraft Television Theatre	Girl	S3:E15, "Man Without a Witness"
1963	Arrest and Trial	Christina Ortega	S1:E3, "Tears from a Silver Dipper"
1963	The Lieutenant	Jackie Madian	Season 1 Episode 14: "The Alien"
1963–1971	The Virginian	Marie Valonne / Frankie Grace	2 episodes
1964	Espionage	Susan Wilder	Season 1 Episode 16: "We the Hunted"
1964	Bob Hope Presents the Chrysler Theatre	Lillian	S1:E24, "The Game with Glass Pieces"
1964–1966	The Fugitive	Sophie / Liz Roland	2 episodes
1964–1967	The Man from U.N.C.L.E.	Clara Valder / Angela Abaca	2 episodes
1965	Daniel Boone	Ester Moncour	Season 1 Episode 13: "The Hostages"
1965	The Defenders	Christine Knox	Season 4 Episode 14: "Whipping Boy"
1965	Slattery's People	Lupe Leon	Season 1 Episode 17: "Question: Does Nero Still at Ringside Sit?"
1965	Burke's Law	Manicurist (uncredited)	Season 3 Episode 3: "Steam Heat"
1965	I Spy	Jean	Season 1 Episode 8: "The Time of the Knife"
1965	A Man Called Shenandoah	Ann Clayton	S1:E12, "A Special Talent for Killing"
1966	Laredo	Dona Dolores	Season 1 Episode 29: "The Would-Be Gentleman of Laredo"
1966	Iron Horse	Angela Burnett	S1:E10, "The Man from New Chicago"
1967	Star Trek	Lt. Marla McGivers	Episode: "Space Seed"
1967	Captain Nice	Amanda Woolf	Season 1 Episode 10: "Who's Afraid of Amanda Woolf?"
1967	The Wild Wild West	Carlotta Waters	Season 3 Episode 1: "The Night of the Bubbling Death"
1967	Stranger on the Run	Alma Britten	TV Movie
1967–1974	Ironside	Margaret Blackwell / Betty Julian / Kate Dunhill / Amy Frost	4 episodes
1968	Cowboy in Africa	Christie Blaine	Season 1 Episode 23: "Work of Art"
1968	It Takes a Thief	Melinda Garcia	S2:E1, "One Night on Soledade"
1968	The Guns of Will Sonnett	Marion Hagger	Season 2 Episode 6: "The Straw Man"
1969–1970	Bracken's World	Majorie Grant	27 episodes (Recurring role)
1969–1975	Mannix	Laura Giles / Marcia Inman / Nedda Kordic	3 episodes
1970	Land of the Giants	Bertha Fry	Season 2 Episode 20: "The Deadly Dart"
1970–1973	Hawaii Five-O	(1) Madge (2) June Fleming	(1) Season 3 Episode 13: "The Payoff" (1970) (2) Season 5 Episode 17: "Here Today... Gone Tonight" (1973)
1971	The Courtship of Eddie's Father	Dolores Carew	Season 3 Episode 7: "Two's Company"
1971	Longstreet	Kim Anderson	Season 1 Episode 11: "This Little Piggy Went to Marquette"
1972	The Manhunter	Teresa Taylor	TV Movie
1972	Banacek	Holly Allencamp	S1:E1, "Let's Hear It for a Living Legend"
1972	Mission: Impossible	Adele Cooper	Season 7 Episode 10: "Ultimatum"
1972	Ghost Story	Georgia Strauss	S1:E12, "Creatures of the Canyon"
1973	Poor Devil	Frances Emerson	TV Movie
1973	Barnaby Jones	Myra Stayley	Season 2 Episode 8: "The Deadly Prize"
1973	Owen Marshall, Counselor at Law	Neva Boland	S3:E10, "Snatches of a Crazy Song"
1974	The Sex Symbol	Joy Hudson	TV Movie
1974	Kolchak: The Night Stalker	Maria	Season 1 Episode 6: "Firefall"
1974–1976	Cannon	Gloria Norlan / Phyllis Behr	2 episodes
1975	Police Story	Sue Ellen	Season 2 Episode 13: "Headhunter"
1975	Baretta	Sharon Fowler	S1:E1, "He'll Never See Daylight"
1975	Petrocelli	Ellen Walker	Season 1 Episode 17: "A Lonely Victim"
1975	Medical Story	Mrs. Doran	TV Movie
1975–1977	Switch	Evelynn Thurston / Donna Mendarez	2 episodes
1976	Starsky and Hutch	Belinda Williams	Season 1 Episode 17: "Losing Streak"
1976	The Streets of San Francisco	Crystal	Season 4 Episode 20: "Clown of Death"
1976–1977	Executive Suite	Hilary Mason/Madison	Series regular
1977	We've Got Each Other	Millie	Season 1 Episode 7: "A Space Odyssey"
1978	The Tony Randall Show	Evelyn	S2:E19, "Phantom of the Poconos"
1979	The Best Place to Be	Emily Stockwood	TV Movie
1979	Charlie's Angels	Georgia	Season 4 Episode 7: "Angels on the Street"
1979	Hart to Hart	Charlotte Fleming	Season 1 Episode 8: "Max in Love"
1979	Goldie and the Boxer	Marsha	TV Movie
1979–1983	CHiPs	Madlyn Rhue (uncredited) / Mildred Sloane	3 episodes
1980	Quincy, M.E.	Laura Stedman	Season 5 Episode 16: "Unhappy Hour"
1981	Dynasty	Lucy	2 episodes
1981	Diff'rent Strokes	Tina Claremont	Season 4 Episode 3: "The Model"
1982	Fantasies	Rebecca	TV Movie
1982	Fantasy Island	Lillie Langtry	Season 6 Episode 3: "The Perfect Gentleman/Legend"
1982	Games Mother Never Taught You		TV Movie
1982–1984	Days of Our Lives	Daphne DiMera	66 episodes
1982–1985	Fame	Mrs. Angela Schwartz	8 episodes
1986	Bridges to Cross	Carolyn Ryan	Series regular
1987	L.A. Law	Judge Wyatt (uncredited)	Season 2 Episode 3: "Cannon of Ethics"
1987–1988	Houston Knights	Annie Hartung	18 episodes (Recurring role)
1989	Trial by Jury	Judge	Season 1 Episode 1: "Episode #1.1"
1989-1996	Murder, She Wrote	(1) Doris West (2) (3) (4) (5) Jean O'Neill	(1) Season 6 Episode 2: "Seal of the Confessional" (1989) (2) Season 10 Episode 3: "The Legacy of Borbey House" (1993) (3) Season 10 Episode 21: "Wheel of Death" (1994) (4) Season 12 Episode 5: "Home Care" (1995) (5) Season 12 Episode 14: "Murder on Tempo" (1996)
1991	A Mother's Justice	Lois Greenfield	TV Movie
