= William Edmund Barrett =

American author (1900–1986)

- Born: William Edmund Barrett; November 16, 1900; New York City
- Died: September 14, 1986 (aged 85); Denver, Colorado
- Education: Manhattan College
- Occupations: Pulp-fiction author, novelist, biographer
- Known for: The Lilies of the Field

William Edmund Barrett, commonly known as William E. Barrett, was an American writer, best known for the 1962 novella The Lilies of the Field which was made into an award-winning film.

== Life ==
Barrett was born in New York City to John Joseph and Eleanor Margaret (Flannery) Barrett. His family was Roman Catholic. In 1916, he and his family moved to Denver, Colorado. He returned east to attend Manhattan College, from which he graduated in 1922. He majored in politics.

Barrett spent most of his life in Denver. From 1923–29 he worked as the Rocky Mountain advertising manager for Westinghouse. He married Christine M. Rollman on February 15, 1925.

Deeply interested in aviation, he was a civilian lecturer for the United States Air Force, and worked as an aeronautics consultant with the Denver Public Library from 1941 on. He received a citation from Regis College in 1956.

== Writing ==
In a writing career that spanned over 50 years, Barrett's works include short stories, biographies, novels, reviews and non-fiction. In 1929, he began writing freelance for pulp magazines. His first novel, Woman on Horseback was published in 1938. In 1964, he wrote Shepherd of Mankind, a biography of Pope Paul VI.

He was a member of PEN and the Authors League of America. In 1961, he received an Honorary Doctor of Literature degree from Creighton University. He was a member of the National Press Club of Washington, D.C., and the Colorado Authors League, serving as its president from 1943–44.

Three of his novels were made into films:

- The Left Hand of God, starring Humphrey Bogart
- Lilies of the Field based on his novel The Lilies of the Field, featuring Sidney Poitier in an Oscar-winning performance.
- Pieces of Dreams, based on The Wine and the Music, the story of a Roman Catholic priest who decides to marry a Protestant divorcee.

Barrett had been in poor health after suffering a heart attack and died in his sleep in Denver.

== Bibliography ==
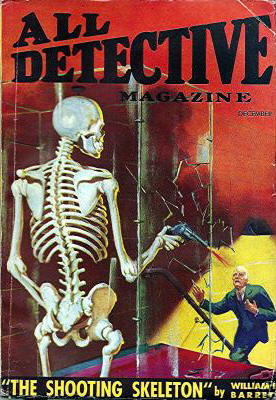
Barrett wrote many mystery stories for pulp magazines like All Detective

- Woman on Horseback (1938)
- Flight from Youth (1939)
- Aviation as a Business (1945)
- The Evil Heart (1946)
- The Number of My Days (1946)
- To the Last Man (1946)
- The Left Hand of God (1951)
- The Shadows of the Images (1953)
- The Sudden Strangers (1956)
- The Empty Shrine (1958)
- The First War Planes (1960)
- The Edge of Things (1960)
- The Lilies of the Field (1962)
- The Fools of Time (1963)
- The Shepherd of Mankind (1964)
- The Glory Tent (1967)
- The Red Lacquered Gate (1967)
- The Wine and the Music (also under the title Pieces of Dreams) (1968)
- A Woman in the House (1971)
- The Shape of Illusion (1972)
- Lady of the Lotus (1975)

== Reprinted pulp-magazine fiction ==
- The Iron Ace (Age of Aces, 2010); collected from Sky Birds magazine
- The Complete Cases of Needle Mike, Volume 1 (Altus Press, 2018); Dime Detective Magazine
- The Complete Cases of the Blue Barrel, Volume 1 (Steeger Books, 2019); Dime Detective Magazine
- The Complete Cases of Needle Mike, Volume 2 (Steeger Books, 2022); Dime Detective Magazine
- The Complete Cases of Needle Mike, Volume 3 (Steeger Books, 2025); Dime Detective Magazine

== See also ==
- List of Manhattan College people
