= The Lilies of the Field (novel) =

Book by William Edmund Barrett

- First edition (publ. Doubleday)
- Author: William Edmund Barrett
- Language: English
- Publisher: Doubleday
- Publication date: 1962
- OCLC: 332560
- LC Class: PZ3.B2766 Li

The Lilies of the Field is a 1962 novel by William Edmund Barrett, who based his depiction of the sisters partly upon the Benedictine nuns of the Abbey of St. Walburga, originally located in Boulder, Colorado.

The novel was filmed as Lilies of the Field in 1963. Its lead actor, Sidney Poitier, won an Academy Award for Best Actor for portraying Homer Smith.

== Plot ==
Homer Smith, just out of the U.S. Army, buys a station wagon in Seattle, equips it for sleeping in and sets out to see the West. Having learned many skills in the army, he picks up jobs as an itinerant handyman/jack-of-all-trades.

One morning, Smith comes to a derelict-looking farm in a valley west of the Rocky Mountains. He sees several women working on a fence, very ineptly. The women, who speak German but very little English, appear to be Catholic nuns. He offers to do a small repair job and stays overnight, assuming that he will be paid in the morning. The next day, Smith tries to persuade the Mother superior to pay him, but it is clear that Old Mother—as he now calls her—is convinced he has been sent by God to build a church.

The nuns—Mother Maria Marthe, and sisters Gertrud, Albertine, Elizabeth and Agnes—have no money, subsist on little food and have no materials to build their church. Nevertheless, Smith—a Baptist—agrees to stay to help them with other small jobs, though he realizes he is unlikely to be paid for his labor.

On Sunday, Smith drives the nuns to Mass in the small largely Spanish-speaking town of Piedras. While the nuns attend Mass, he takes the opportunity to get a "man’s breakfast" at the café. The owner tells him that the nuns came from East Germany, as the property was willed to their Order by potato farmer Gus Ritter, whose sister was a nun with the Order. The owner and townsfolk do not believe the nuns can succeed in their endeavors.

Smith stays longer and finds himself driven to work on the church. In the larger town of North Fork, he meets Orville Livingston, who runs a construction company, and was Ritter’s friend and executor. He assisted the nuns when they arrived, but is unwilling to do more, such as donating bricks.

To earn money to buy some "real food" to supplement the Spartan diet the nuns are able to provide him, Smith gets a part-time job with Livingston, working two days a week. Smith can handle nearly every piece of heavy equipment Livingston owns. Smith supplements the nuns' diet, shopping for groceries to stock up their kitchen.

Smith (whom the nuns now call "Schmidt") helps the sisters improve their rudimentary English (only Mother Maria speaks the language well enough to converse with him) and joins them in singing and playing his guitar.

As the weather gets too hot to work, Smith decides to take time off in the big city. When his money runs out, he takes a job on a wrecking crew, which involves dirty and dangerous work. He buys some usable items—a bathtub and some windows—then heads back to the farm to install them so the nuns at least have a proper bath in which to wash.

Everyone is astounded that he’s returned, except Mother Maria. The townsfolk start to assist, delivering adobe bricks, but Smith is ever more reluctant to let them help him build "his" church. Even Livingston finds an excuse to deliver some more materials. The work goes ahead. The church is completed and Smith is exhausted. Mother Maria insists that he attend the opening Mass next day to receive proper recognition from the congregation, but Smith knows that his work is done. Late that night, he quietly packs up and leaves, knowing that he will not return.

The story of "Schmidt" quickly gains legendary status. Tourists come to admire the church, stories are written in the press and donations are made to complete other buildings. A school is established for boys who have been in trouble with the law, just as the nuns wanted. The centerpiece of the church is a painting by Sister Albertine of Saint Benedict the Moor, who bears an uncanny resemblance to Smith.
