= Revenge of the Nerds (film series) =

US comedy franchise

Revenge of the Nerds is an American comedy franchise. The series revolves around a group of socially-inept students (the nerds) trying to get revenge on their harassers. The series began with the eponymous 1984 film and was followed by three sequels: Revenge of the Nerds II: Nerds in Paradise (1987), Revenge of the Nerds III: The Next Generation (1992) (TV), and Revenge of the Nerds IV: Nerds in Love (1994) (TV). A remake of the first film was to begin filming in October 2006 for a prospective release in 2007 but was cancelled due to problems securing a viable filming location. In December 2020, it was announced that Family Guy creator Seth MacFarlane would reboot the series under his Fuzzy Door Productions label.

== Cast ==
Characters
Characters	Revenge of the Nerds	Revenge of the Nerds II: Nerds in Paradise	Revenge of the Nerds III: The Next Generation	Revenge of the Nerds IV: Nerds in Love
Lewis Skolnik	Robert Carradine	Robert Carradine	Robert Carradine	Robert Carradine
Dudley "Booger" Dawson	Curtis Armstrong	Curtis Armstrong	Curtis Armstrong	Curtis Armstrong
Lamar Latrelle	Larry B. Scott	Larry B. Scott	Larry B. Scott	Larry B. Scott
Mr. Skolnick	James Cromwell	James Cromwell	James Cromwell	James Cromwell
Gilbert Lowe	Anthony Edwards	Anthony Edwards	Mike Greenwood	
Harold Wormser	Andrew Cassese	Andrew Cassese	Sean Whalen	
Frederick Aloysius "Ogre" Palowaski	Donald Gibb	Donald Gibb		Donald Gibb
Arnold Poindexter	Timothy Busfield	Timothy Busfield		
Betty Childs	Julia Montgomery	Photograph	Julia Montgomery	Julia Montgomery
Takashi Toshiro	Brian Tochi		Brian Tochi	Brian Tochi
Stanley Harvey "Stan" Gable	Ted McGinley		Ted McGinley	Ted McGinley
U.N. Jefferson	Bernie Casey		Bernie Casey	Bernie Casey
Dean Ulich	David Wohl		Alan Wittert	
Harold Skolnick			Gregg Binkley	Gregg Binkley
Trevor Gulf			John Pinette	John Pinette
Judy	Michelle Meyrink			
Danny Burke	Matt Salinger			
Suzy	Lisa Welch			
Coach Harris	John Goodman			
Mrs. Flo Lowe	Alice Hirson			
Sunny Carstairs		Courtney Thorne-Smith		
Roger Latimer		Bradley Whitford		
Stewart		Barry Sobel		
Buzz		Ed Lauter		
Edgar "Snotty" Po Wong		James Hong		
Tiny		Tom Hodges		
Mr. Comstock		Jack Gilpin		
Pot Roast		Michael Fitzgerald		
Orrin Price			Morton Downey, Jr.	
Ira Poppus			Richard Israel	
Steve Toyota			Henry Cho	
Malcolm Pennington III			Chi McBride	
Mason			Grant Heslov	
Edith Krug			K.T. Vogt	
Adam Price			Tim Conlon	
Bobo Peterson			Mark Clayman	
Judy			Laurel Moglen	Laurel Moglen
Jeannie Humphrey-Dawson				Corinne Bohrer
Aaron Humphrey				Joseph Bologna
Tippy				Christina Pickles
Gaylord Medford				Jessica Tuck
Chad Penrod				Robert Picardo
Chip Medford				Stephen Davies
Mr. Dawson				Marvin Kaplan
Mylan Whitfield				James Karen

== Crew ==
Film	U.S. release date	Director(s)	Screenwriter(s)	Story and characters by	Producer(s)
Revenge of the Nerds	July 20, 1984	Jeff Kanew	Steve Zacharias & Jeff Buhai	Tim Metcalfe & Miguel Tejada-Flores and Steve Zacharias & Jeff Buhai	Ted Field and Peter Samuelson
Revenge of the Nerds II: Nerds in Paradise	July 10, 1987	Joe Roth	Dan Guntzelman & Steve Marshall	Tim Metcalfe & Miguel Tejada-Flores and Steve Zacharias & Jeff Buhai	Ted Field, Robert W. Cort & Peter Bart
Revenge of the Nerds III: The Next Generation	July 13, 1992	Roland Mesa	Steve Zacharias & Jeff Buhai	Tim Metcalfe & Miguel Tejada-Flores and Steve Zacharias & Jeff Buhai	Robert Engelman
Revenge of the Nerds IV: Nerds in Love	May 9, 1994	Steve Zacharias	Steve Zacharias & Jeff Buhai	Tim Metcalfe & Miguel Tejada-Flores and Steve Zacharias & Jeff Buhai	Ooty Moorehead

== Reception ==
Film	Rotten Tomatoes	Metacritic	CinemaScore
Revenge of the Nerds	71% (43 reviews)	44 (6 reviews)	—N/a
Revenge of the Nerds II: Nerds in Paradise	7% (27 reviews)	28 (11 reviews)	C
Revenge of the Nerds III: The Next Generation	—N/a	—N/a	—N/a
Revenge of the Nerds IV: Nerds in Love	—N/a	—N/a	—N/a
