= Revenge of the Nerds III: The Next Generation =

1992 film by Roland Mesa

- DVD cover
- Genre: Comedy
- Based on: Characters by Tim Metcalfe; Miguel Tejada-Flores; Steve Zacharias; Jeff Buhai
- Written by: Steve Zacharias; Jeff Buhai
- Directed by: Roland Mesa
- Starring: Robert Carradine; Curtis Armstrong; Ted McGinley; Julia Montgomery; Gregg Binkley; Richard Israel; Morton Downey Jr.
- Music by: Garry Schyman
- Country of origin: United States
- Original language: English

Production
- Executive producer: Jeff Buhai
- Producers: Robert Engelman; Steve Zacharias
- Production locations: 357 S. Lorraine Blvd., Los Angeles, California; Loyola Marymount University
- Cinematography: Zoran Hochstätter
- Editor: Seth Gaven
- Running time: 93 minutes
- Production companies: Zacharias/Buhai Productions; 20th Television; FNM Films
- Budget: $2 million

Original release
- Network: Fox
- Release: July 13, 1992

Related
- Revenge of the Nerds II: Nerds in Paradise; Revenge of the Nerds IV: Nerds in Love

Revenge of the Nerds III: The Next Generation is a 1992 American made-for-television comedy film and a sequel to the 1984 hit comedy film Revenge of the Nerds, produced by Robert Engelman, directed by Roland Mesa, that stars Robert Carradine, Curtis Armstrong, Ted McGinley, Julia Montgomery, and Morton Downey Jr. It is the third installment in the Revenge of the Nerds series. The subtitle is a reference to the TV series Star Trek: The Next Generation, which was then at the height of its popularity. The film was followed by Revenge of the Nerds IV: Nerds in Love (1994).

== Plot ==
Years after Lambda Lambda Lambda (Tri-Lambs) defeated the Alpha Betas and secured rights for nerds, Adams College has become a haven for intellectualism, with the Tri-Lambs now one of the campus's most respected fraternities. Harold Skolnick—the nephew of former Tri-Lamb leader Lewis Skolnick—and his friend Ira Poppus enrol at Adams. Meanwhile, former Alpha Beta Orrin Price, now a wealthy businessman, brings his nerd-hating son to the college. Disapproving of Adams's transformation and the Alpha Betas' diminished status, Price convinces the board of regents to replace retiring Dean Ulich with former Alpha Beta—and Lewis's rival—Stan Gable.

Lewis, now chair of the Computer Science Department, has grown embarrassed by his nerdy past and is determined to appear "hip". He adopts a new look, suppresses his nerdy laugh, and urges Harold to pledge Alpha Beta instead of Tri-Lamb, admitting he once longed to join the Alphas and still resents being rejected. His wife Betty, Stan's former girlfriend, reminds Lewis that she loved him for embracing who he was. However, Lewis remains intent on winning Stan's approval, unaware that Stan seeks to reassert Alpha Beta dominance and take Betty from him.

Harold and Ira pledge the Tri-Lambs instead. During a celebration for new members, the Alpha Betas, encouraged by Stan and Price, attack the fraternity and also vandalise the campus computer centre. The Tri-Lambs retaliate by using their influence to publicly embarrass the Alphas. In response, Price and Stan remove the nerds from their campus positions. Lewis refuses to confront Stan, believing they are truly friends, prompting Harold to criticise his uncle for abandoning the principles he once championed.

The Tri-Lambs enlist alumnus Dudley "Booger" Dawson as legal counsel against Stan and Price, but the nerd-hating judge rejects their case. After seeing Lewis socialising with Stan, Booger denounces him as a self-hating nerd. Price escalates the conflict by planting marijuana in the Tri-Lambs' house, leading to their arrest and the confiscation of their house, which is handed to the Alpha Betas.

Lewis confronts Stan and Price but is shaken when Stan dismisses him as a nerd, denies their friendship, and blames the nerds for ruining his life. Realising he has compromised his identity for acceptance, Lewis embraces his former self. He bails out the Tri-Lambs and shelters them at his home. Together, they organise a "nerd strike", urging the marginalised to unite. Because many essential services are operated by nerds, the strike disrupts the town.

Price retaliates by framing Lewis for embezzling college funds, destroying his credibility and ending the strike. Betty appeals to Stan to admit the truth, reminding him that Lewis genuinely valued his friendship. Stan claims that no one has real friends and briefly proposes sparing Lewis in exchange for Betty's affection, but withdraws in shame.

At Lewis's trial, the same judge rejects Booger's defence. However, Lewis and Booger's former Tri-Lamb brothers and Lewis's father appear in support. Confronted with evidence of Lewis's loyalty and friendship, Stan experiences a change of heart and testifies against Price, exposing both the embezzlement scheme and the planted marijuana. He admits his resentment toward nerds stemmed from self-loathing, confessing he always preferred reading and learning but felt pressured to prioritise popularity and athletics. Accepting his identity, Stan reconciles with Lewis and is welcomed by the Tri-Lambs. Lewis pledges to support Stan's continued tenure as dean, reaffirming Adams College's commitment to protecting nerd rights.

== Cast ==
This film features a new generation of nerds in the Lambda Lambda Lambda fraternity and also marks the return of several other characters from the first two films.

- Robert Carradine as Lewis "Lew" Skolnick
- Ted McGinley as Stanley Harvey "Stan" Gable
- Curtis Armstrong as Dudley "Booger" Dawson
- Julia Montgomery as Betty Childs Skolnick
- Morton Downey Jr. as Orrin Price
- Gregg Binkley as Harold Skolnick
- Jennifer Bassey as Ruth
- Richard Israel as Ira Poppus
- Henry Cho as Steve Toyota
- Bernie Casey as U. N. Jefferson
- James Cromwell as Mr. Skolnick
- Mark Clayman as Bobo Peterson
- Mike Greenwood as Gilbert Lowe
- Laurel Moglen as Judy
- Larry B. Scott as Lamar Latrelle
- Sean Whalen as Harold Wormser
- Brian Tochi as Takashi Toshiro
- John Pinette as Trevor Gulf
- Chi McBride as Malcolm Pennington III (as Chi)
- Grant Heslov as Mason

== Production ==
Revenge of the Nerds III: The Next Generation was green lit as a potential pilot for a Revenge of the Nerds TV series that would feature a younger generation of who must face against the Alpha Betas. The film was written and executive produced by Steve Zacharias and Jeff Buhai who had written the original Revenge of the Nerds.

=== Casting ===
Instead of actors, much of the titular "next generation" of nerds were portrayed by stand-up comedians. Anthony Edwards was unavailable for his role of Gilbert Lowe, Lewis' best friend. Gilbert appears in the film, played by Mike Greenwood, while Sean Whalen plays the role of Wormser, replacing Andrew Cassese. Alan Wittert takes the role of Dean Ulich, replacing David Wohl. The Poindexter character was written out of the series due to actor Timothy Busfield choosing not to participate in the film. Curtis Armstrong felt the recasting of the characters was a terrible idea and tried to convince Zacharias and Buhai against it but they went ahead believing fans would be eager to see the characters even if the actors were different. Andrew Cassese has stated he would've done the cameo appearance but theorized the producers didn't want to go through the expense of flying him out and instead opted for the cheaper option of recasting the character. Cassese's absence from the film is also partially credited with starting a rumor that he was dead.

== Reception ==
In Variety, critic Carole Kucharewicz summarized that "although the concept is no longer fresh, it provides some hearty, though rather far between, laughs. 'Nerd' devotees will stick it through to the end although the uninitiated may not get past the first hour; or they may not just get it." She was pleased that despite the film's subtitle, it was chiefly focused on the same themes and characters that made the first film in the series so enjoyable. She said that while many of the sight gags and the performances of Armstrong, Carradine, and Cho were genuinely hilarious, the script became bogged down in flat material for long stretches. Entertainment Weekly's brief review gave the film a C, remarking that "There are a few chuckles in Revenge of the Nerds III: The Next Generation, but the sustained merriment of the original is long gone."

== Home media ==
The film was released on DVD both as part of the Atomic Wedgie Collection and separately.
