= Andrew Cassese =

American actor

- Occupations: Actor, musician
- Years active: 1983–

Andrew Cassese (born 1971 or 1972 (age 54–55)) is an American stage and film actor and musician. Born in New York, Cassese is perhaps best known for starring in the 1984 comedy film Revenge of the Nerds and its 1987 sequel Revenge of the Nerds II: Nerds in Paradise as child prodigy Harold Wormser. In 2007, he starred as Microsoft co-founder Paul Allen in the Philadelphia Theatre Company premiere of Nerds://A Musical Software Satire.

== Life and career ==
Cassese is an Italian American native of Brooklyn, New York. He attended Patchogue-Medford High School on Long Island, graduating in 1990. Cassese graduated from the NYU Film School in 1995 with three years of production experience with Fox News Channel in New York.

An actor by trade, his credits also include starring roles on Broadway in the productions of Smile and Nine, Tommy Tune's award-winning musical starring Raul Julia. Cassese was also one of the stars of the CBS series, TV 101. Cassese is an accomplished guitarist and singer, and is a member of SAG, AFTRA, and Actor's Equity. In 2017, Cassese joined Robert Carradine, Don Gibb, Curtis Armstrong, Larry B. Scott, Brian Tochi and Julia Montgomery for interviews at the Rhode Island Comic Con. The following year in 2018, Cassese joined Robert Carradine and Don Gibb for interviews at the Niagara Falls Comic Con. Cassee joined Robert Carradine, Timothy Busfield, Curtis Armstrong, Julia Montgomery, Larry B. Scott, Brian Tochi, and Donald Gibb for a 40th Anniversary Revenge of the Nerds panel on August 10, 2024 at the New Jersey Horror Con.

== Filmography ==
- Revenge of the Nerds (1984)
- Chips Ahoy! (1986) TV commercial
- Hi-C (1985) TV commercial
- The Kingdom Chums: Little David's Adventure (1986) (TV)
- Revenge of the Nerds II: Nerds in Paradise (1987)
- TV 101 (1988) TV Series

== Stage ==
- Smile
- Nine
- Eight is NEVER Enough! (2002)
- I Love My Wife (2004)
- Nerds://A Musical Software Satire (2007)
