= Revenge of the Nerds IV: Nerds in Love =

- DVD cover
- Genre: Comedy; Romance
- Based on: Characters by Tim Metcalfe; Miguel Tejada-Flores; Steve Zacharias; Jeff Buhai
- Written by: Steve Zacharias; Jeff Buhai
- Directed by: Steve Zacharias
- Starring: Robert Carradine; Curtis Armstrong; Julia Montgomery; Ted McGinley; Corinne Bohrer; Jessica Tuck; Robert Picardo
- Music by: Garry Schyman
- Country of origin: United States
- Original language: English

Production
- Executive producers: Jeff Buhai; Steve Zacharias
- Producer: Ooty Moorehead
- Cinematography: Zoran Hochstätter
- Editor: Gary Karr
- Running time: 92 minutes
- Production companies: Fox West Pictures; Zacharias/Buhai Productions

Original release
- Network: Fox
- Release: May 9, 1994

Related
- Revenge of the Nerds III: The Next Generation

Revenge of the Nerds IV: Nerds in Love is a 1994 American made-for-television comedy film, a sequel to the 1984 film Revenge of the Nerds, and the final installment in the Revenge of the Nerds series.

== Plot ==
After three months of dating, Dudley "Booger" Dawson is set to marry his girlfriend Jeannie Humphrey on Valentine's Day. Days before the wedding, Jeannie introduces Booger to her wealthy and socially ambitious family. While her mother Tippy and sister Gaylord move past their initial shock and offer support, her father Aaron, a self-conscious nouveau riche businessman, cannot accept his daughter marrying a nerd.

Booger invites his former Lambda Lambda Lambda (Tri-Lamb) fraternity brothers to the ceremony, including Lewis Skolnick and his pregnant wife Betty, Takashi Toshiro, Lamar Latrelle, Judy, Harold Skolnick, Trevor Gulf, and former Alpha Betas Stan Gable and Ogre. Alarmed that Booger and his eccentric friends will undermine his cultivated high-society image and damage his political ambitions, Aaron confides in Gaylord's husband, Chip Medford. Chip proposes sabotaging the wedding. Though conflicted, Aaron reluctantly agrees.

At the pre-wedding cocktail party, Aaron is embarrassed before his distinguished guests by the nerds' uninhibited behaviour, Jeannie's socially awkward former Omega Mu sorority sisters, and Aaron's sister Lois openly flirting with Harold. Gaylord, disillusioned with her own marriage, expresses admiration for Jeannie finding a partner who values her for herself. Later, Booger confides in Lewis that he fears marriage will end his carefree lifestyle and that he might disappoint Jeannie. Lewis reassures him that marriage strengthened his own life. Meanwhile, Chip hires a disreputable private investigator, Chad Penrod, who fabricates a story about Booger having a child.

At the bridal shower, Chip publicly accuses Booger of abandoning his twelve-year-old daughter. Booger denies the claim, but Aaron angrily cancels the wedding. Though shaken, Jeannie maintains her faith in Booger. Undeterred, Chip arranges for beautiful women to attend Booger's bachelor party and secretly records one attempting to seduce him. Booger rejects her advances, affirming his love for Jeannie. The nerds obtain the tape and edit it to include footage of Chip engaging in his own infidelity. When Chip presents the video to the Humphreys in an attempt to expose Booger, it instead vindicates him, while Gaylord announces she will divorce Chip after years of emotional mistreatment.

On Valentine's Day, Tippy confronts Aaron, threatening divorce if he refuses to support Jeannie, and, appreciating the nerds' honesty, criticises his obsession with social status, asking him to remember who he really is. Meanwhile, Chip arrives with Booger's daughter, Heidi, and the ceremony is halted once more. Distraught, Jeannie refuses to speak to Booger until he pole-vaults into her room to plead his case, and they reconcile. During the service, Betty unexpectedly goes into labour, and the guests unite to assist her.

Moved by the loyalty among the nerds, Heidi admits she is not Booger's daughter and that Chip brought her from an orphanage. Outraged, Aaron and Gaylord force Chip to leave. Aaron apologises for his prejudice, accepts that he is nouveau riche, and acknowledges his admiration for the nerds' authenticity. Heidi prepares to depart, but Booger and Jeannie offer to adopt her. Betty gives birth to a son, and Booger and Jeannie finally marry, surrounded by friends and family.

== Cast ==
- Curtis Armstrong as Dudley "Booger" Dawson
- Corinne Bohrer as Jeanie Humphrey
- Joseph Bologna as Aaron Humphrey
- Robert Carradine as Lewis Skolnick
- Julia Montgomery as Betty Skolnick
- Christina Pickles as Tippy
- Jessica Tuck as Gaylord
- Robert Picardo as Chad Penrod
- Stephen Davies as Chip Medford
- Laurel Moglen as Judy
- Sophie Buhai as Heidi Dawson
- Larry B. Scott as Lamar Latrelle
- Brian Tochi as Takashi Toshiro
- Ted McGinley as Stan Gable
- James Cromwell as Mr. Skolnick
- Donald Gibb as Ogre
- Bernie Casey as U. N. Jefferson
- John Pinette as Trevor Gulf
- Gregg Binkley as Harold
- Marvin Kaplan as Mr. Dawson
- James Karen as Mylan Whitfield
- Diane Robin as Lois Humphrey

== Promotion ==
The film was broadcast as part of the Monday night "Fox-o-Rama" promotion. As a promotional gimmick, Fox telecast the film in 3-D and "aroma-vision", the latter of which utilized a series of scratch and sniff cards sold at 7-Eleven outlets, each to be used at certain points during the movie. A prompt appeared at the bottom right-hand corner of the screen to let viewers know when to smell their cards and which card to sniff. Several other network shows employed similar gimmicks with aromatic cards and 3D glasses at around the same time, including Living Single and Married... with Children. The 3D effects used in these broadcasts was based on the Pulfrich effect.

== Reception ==
Todd Everett of Variety had a subdued reaction to the film. He said it was "capably directed" and that the 3-D and "aroma-vision" effects were "OK", and praised several of the actors' performances, but criticized the script as being typical made-for-TV filler, and said that overall the Nerd series was wearing thin.
