= Brian Tochi =

American actor

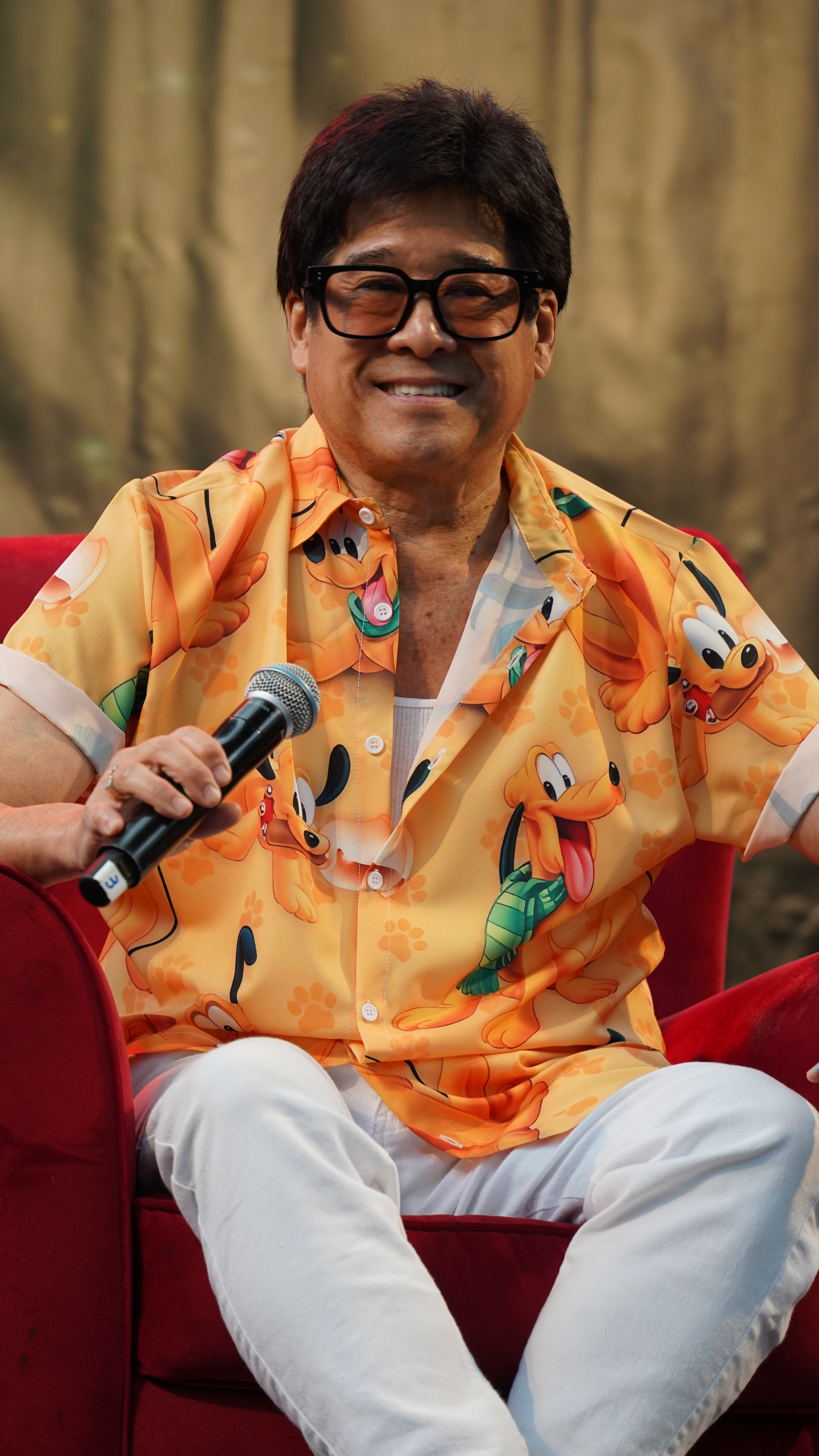
- Brian Tochi in 2025
- Born: Brian Keith Tochihara; Los Angeles, California, U.S.
- Occupation: Actor
- Years active: 1968–present

Brian Tochi (born Brian Keith Tochihara) is an American actor. During the late 1960s through much of the 1970s and 1980s, he was one of the most widely seen East Asian child actors working in U.S. television, appearing in various TV series and nearly a hundred advertisements. He is recognized around the world for starring in some of the most popular film franchises of all time, and best known for his characters Toshiro Takashi from the Revenge of the Nerds film franchise, Cadet (later Lieutenant) Tomoko Nogata from the third and fourth films in the Police Academy series, and as the voice of Leonardo in the first three live-action Teenage Mutant Ninja Turtles films.

== Early life ==
Tochi was born in Los Angeles, California. He is the son of Joe Isao Tochihara, a Beverly Hills celebrity hair salon owner (popularly known as 'Tochi'), and Jane Yaeko (née Harada), Japanese-Americans who were forcibly interned during World War II. While Tochi was young, the family moved from Los Angeles to Orange County, California, where he divided his education between local public schools and studio tutors. After graduating, Tochi also attended U.S.C., UCLA, and U.C.I.

Tochi's introduction into the entertainment industry came as a toddler. His father's beauty salon, Tochi Coiffure of Beverly Hills, was a popular haunt for many famous clients, including Lana Turner, Hedy Lamarr, Lucille Ball, Judy Garland, Petula Clark and Patty Duke. One of his father's customers, a top child agent, spotted the young Tochi running around the salon and quickly signed to represent him.

== Career ==
=== As a child actor ===
A beginning role for Tochi was a guest-starring appearance in the short-lived television series He & She (1967–68, with Richard Benjamin and Paula Prentiss) as their newly adopted son. Produced by Leonard Stern and cowritten by Chris Hayward and Allan Burns, it also starred Jack Cassidy, Kenneth Mars, and Hamilton Camp.

That same year saw Tochi appearing in "And the Children Shall Lead", a third-season episode of Star Trek. Other roles followed, including guest appearances on such popular shows as The Brady Bunch, The Partridge Family, and Adam-12.

Tochi's debut as a series regular was as Yul Brynner's oldest son and heir Crown Prince Chulalongkorn in Anna and the King on CBS. It was based on the film version of Rodgers and Hammerstein's The King and I and also starred Samantha Eggar and Keye Luke. Although the series was short-lived, Tochi and Brynner remained friends until Brynner's death in 1985.

Concurrent with the series, Tochi and Luke were cast in The Amazing Chan and the Chan Clan. Also in the series was a young Jodie Foster, who voiced one of the Chan sisters.

After both series ended, guest-starring roles followed, including The Streets of San Francisco with Karl Malden and Michael Douglas, and Kung Fu with David Carradine, who made his directing debut on the episode, "The Demon God," which was Tochi's largest guest role of three Kung Fu episodes he appeared in, Police Story, and Marcus Welby, M.D..

=== Young adulthood in theater ===
During the mid-1970s, Tochi spent time in the theatre, this time reprising his role as Crown Prince Chulalongkorn in the Los Angeles Civic Light Opera's revival of the musical The King and I at the Dorothy Chandler Pavilion. Tochi co-starred with actor Ricardo Montalbán as the King of Siam, to which they would later accompany the show as it went on tour.

=== Return to television ===
Tochi returned to star in another TV series Space Academy (1977–1979) with veteran actor Jonathan Harris. Up until that time, Space Academy was the most expensive Saturday morning television series in broadcast history. His character, Tee Gar Soom, had super-strength and continued the martial arts traditions of his Asian ancestors. During hiatus of the show, Tochi was asked to shoot a 20-minute promotional "behind-the-scenes" visit to the Space Academy for a popular daytime series, Razzmatazz, on CBS. Razzmatazz was a highly regarded news magazine show created by 60 Minutes wizard Don Hewitt and produced by Joel Heller with the same production team as CBS's In The News the long-running Saturday morning news programs for children. Razzmatazz originally starred Barry Bostwick, who opted to leave the show for a career in features, to capitalize on his recently released cult classic The Rocky Horror Picture Show. Searching for a new host, the television network persuaded Tochi to accept their offer of his own daytime show, which aired on the network for four more years into the early 1980s.

Other appearances include a guest stint on Wonder Woman, a recurring character in the tropically set Hawaii Five-O, starring actor Jack Lord, a two-hour television film We're Fighting Back (with Ellen Barkin and Stephen Lang), and regular television roles in the TV dramas St. Elsewhere and Santa Barbara. He later played a featured character in the Star Trek: The Next Generation episode "Night Terrors" (making him one of only a handful of living actors to have appeared on the original Star Trek series and a subsequent spin-off series). Tochi also appeared as the titular character in "Wong's Lost and Found Emporium," the ninth episode from the first season of the television series The Twilight Zone. The episode is based on the short story "Wong's Lost and Found Emporium" by William F. Wu, first published in Amazing Stories in 1983.

In the ABC TV series The Renegades, Tochi starred with his friend, Patrick Swayze, as the martial arts expert and former gang leader known as Dragon. Then, exercising his journalistic prowess, Tochi later became part of the core team that created and developed the cutting edge educational news program Channel One News. During his two-and-a-half-year association, his responsibilities grew to include Hosting and Narrating duties, utilizing his talents as a writer, producer and segment director. He was later named Chief Foreign correspondent for the show.

=== Other work ===
In 2004, Tochi co-wrote, produced and directed Tales of a Fly on the Wall, a scripted, live-action comedy, casting several of his friends in lead roles; it included fellow actors Roscoe Lee Browne, his Revenge of the Nerds co-star Curtis Armstrong and his Police Academy 3: Back in Training co-star Leslie Easterbrook. In 2005, he was one of the winners of the Hollywood Film Festival's Hollywood Screenplay Awards, taking home top honors for co-writing the screenplay "In the Heat of the Light". He continues with his directing, producing, and screenwriting careers.

Tochi has provided voices for numerous animated films, video games and animated cartoon series, including the Bionic Six (all 65 episodes), Challenge of the GoBots, Scooby-Doo and Scrappy-Doo, What's New, Scooby-Doo?, The Real Adventures of Jonny Quest, and Mortal Kombat: Defenders of the Realm (as its main star Liu Kang). He performed the voice of Leonardo in the first three Teenage Mutant Ninja Turtles films in the early 1990s. He had recurring roles in Batman Beyond, As Told by Ginger, Kim Possible, Johnny Bravo, Static Shock, Family Guy and Avatar: The Last Airbender.

== Filmography ==
=== Film ===
Film
| Year | Title | Role | Notes |
|---|---|---|---|
| 1971 | The Omega Man | Tommy | |
| 1980 | The Octagon | Seikura at Eighteen | |
| 1984 | Revenge of the Nerds | Takashi | |
| 1985 | Stitches | Sam Boon Tong | |
| 1986 | Police Academy 3: Back in Training | Cadet Tomoko Nogata | |
| 1987 | Police Academy 4: Citizens on Patrol | Officer Tomoko Nogata | |
| 1989 | One Man Force | Stockbroker | |
| 1990 | Teenage Mutant Ninja Turtles | Leonardo | Voice |
| 1991 | Teenage Mutant Ninja Turtles II: The Secret of the Ooze | Leonardo | Voice |
| 1992 | The Player | Himself | |
| 1992 | Aladdin | Arabian Villagers | Voice, uncredited |
| 1993 | Teenage Mutant Ninja Turtles III | Leonardo | Voice |
| 1994 | The Lion King | Fighting Hyena | Voice, uncredited |
| 1995 | Pocahontas | Ship Captain | Voice, uncredited |
| 1995 | Toy Story | Green Army Men | Voice, uncredited |
| 1996 | The Hunchback of Notre Dame | Frollo's Soldiers, Horse, Villagers | Voice, uncredited |
| 1997 | Cats Don't Dance | Reporters | Voice, uncredited |
| 1997 | Hercules | Greek Citizen, Scrawny Builder | Voice, uncredited |
| 1997 | Fathers' Day | Concert Security Chief | Uncredited |
| 1997 | Starship Troopers | Male Trooper | Uncredited |
| 1997 | Critics and Other Freaks | Asian Boy | |
| 1998 | Mulan | Ancestors, Hun Army | Voice, uncredited |
| 1998 | A Bug's Life | Male Ants | Voice, uncredited |
| 1998 | The Prince of Egypt | Rameses's Soldiers | Voice, uncredited |
| 1999 | The King and I | Soldier | Voice |
| 1999 | Tarzan | Elephant | Voice, uncredited |
| 1999 | The Iron Giant | Bob the Soldier, additional voices | |
| 1999 | Fight Club | Fight Bully | Uncredited |
| 1999 | Toy Story 2 | Baggage Handler #1 | Voice, uncredited |
| 2000 | The Emperor's New Groove | Villagers | Voice, uncredited |
| 2001 | The Boys of Sunset Ridge | Charlie Watanabe at 33 | |
| 2001 | The Silent Force | Kim Pao | |
| 2001 | Shaolin Soccer | Mighty Steel Leg Sing | Voice, English dub |
| 2002 | Treasure Planet | Male Alien | Voice, uncredited |
| 2004 | Mulan II | Palace Advisor | Voice |
| 2004 | Home on the Range | Cowboys | Voice, uncredited |
| 2004 | Shrek 2 | Guards | ADR Group |
| 2004 | The Incredibles | Firefighters, Snug Porter | Uncredited |
| 2005 | Madagascar | Crowd Member | ADR Group |
| 2005 | Wallace & Gromit: The Curse of the Were-Rabbit | Additional voices | Uncredited |
| 2005 | Chicken Little | Male Dog #3 | Voice, uncredited |
| 2006 | Curious George | Zoo Animals | Voice, uncredited |
| 2006 | Cars | Various Reporters | Voice, uncredited |
| 2008 | Forgetting Sarah Marshall | Makani | Uncredited |
| 2009 | I Do | Peacher | |
| 2023 | Urkel Saves Santa: the Movie | Mr. Kochiyama | Voice, Direct-to-Video |

=== Television ===
Television
| Year | Title | Role | Notes |
|---|---|---|---|
| 1968 | He & She | Kim | Episode: "Along Came Kim" |
| 1968 | Star Trek: The Original Series | Ray | Episode: "And the Children Shall Lead" |
| 1970 | The Brady Bunch | Tommy | Episode: "What Goes Up..." |
| 1971 | The Bold Ones: The New Doctors | Chin Johnson | Episode: "One Lonely Step" |
| 1971 | The Partridge Family | Young Boy | Episode: "A Tale of Two Hamsters" |
| 1971 | Nanny and the Professor | Jimmy Okura | Episode: "One for the Road" |
| 1971 | Adam-12 | Flower Boy | Episode: "Assassination" |
| 1971, 1976 | Marcus Welby, M.D. | Larry, Max Redding | Episodes: "This Is Mac", "Strike Two!" |
| 1972 | The Amazing Chan and the Chan Clan | Alan Chan | Voice, 14 episodes |
| 1972 | Anna and the King | Prince Chulalongkorn | 13 episodes |
| 1973 | The Streets of San Francisco | Davey | Episode: "Trail of the Serpent" |
| 1973–1974 | Kung Fu | Ho Fong, Shen Ung | 3 episodes |
| 1975 | Police Story | Louis Han | 2 episodes |
| 1977 | Space Academy | Tee Gar | 15 episodes |
| 1978 | Project U.F.O. | Student | Episode: "Sighting 4006: The Nevada Desert Incident" |
| 1978 | Wonder Woman | Darrell | Episode: "The Deadly Dolphin" |
| 1978–1979 | Hawaii Five-O | Joey Lee | 3 episodes |
| 1979 | Scooby-Doo and Scrappy-Doo | Additional voices | 1 episode |
| 1981 | We're Fighting Back | Ling | Television film |
| 1983 | The Renegades | Dragon | 6 episodes |
| 1984 | The Master | Jonathan Chan | Episode: "Out-if-Time-Step" |
| 1984 | Challenge of the GoBots | Additional voices | 1 episode |
| 1984 | St. Elsewhere | Dr. Alan Poe | Episode: "Playing God: Part 1" |
| 1985 | CBS Storybreak | Unknown role | Voice, episode "Yeh-Shen: A Cinderella Story from China" |
| 1985 | The Twilight Zone | David Wong | Episode: "Wong's Lost and Found Emporium" |
| 1987 | Bionic Six | Karate-1, Bunjiro 'Bunji' Bennett / Rivet Rick | Voice, 65 episodes |
| 1988 | Santa Barbara | Kai | 26 episodes |
| 1989 | The Karate Kid | Additional voices | Episode: "My Brother's Keeper" |
| 1991 | Star Trek: The Next Generation | Ensign Kenny Lin | Episode: "Night Terrors" |
| 1992 | Revenge of the Nerds III: The Next Generation | Takashi | Television film |
| 1993 | Bonkers | Unknown role | Voice, episode: "Tokyo Bonkers" |
| 1993 | Teenage Mutant Ninja Turtles | Yoku | Voice, episode: "White Belt, Black Heart" |
| 1994 | Revenge of the Nerds IV: Nerds in Love | Takashi | Television film |
| 1994 | Aladdin | Zhin Lao, Zhang Lao | Episode: "Opposites Detract" |
| 1995 | Captain Planet and the Planeteers | Li | Voice, episode: "In Zarm's Way" |
| 1995 | Vanishing Son | Ricky | Episode: "Lock and Load, Babe" |
| 1995 | The Sylvester & Tweety Mysteries | Sushi Master | Voice, episode: "Something Fishy Around Here" |
| 1995 | Diagnosis Murder | Eddie Lok | Episode: "Murder in the Courthouse" |
| 1995–1997 | Happily Ever After: Fairy Tales for Every Child | Turtle Photographer, Tsui, Prince, The Tailer | Voice, 3 episodes |
| 1996 | Mortal Kombat: Defenders of the Realm | Liu Kang | Voice, 13 episodes |
| 1996–1997 | The Real Adventures of Jonny Quest | Professor Ken Otsuki, Techie | Voice, 2 episodes |
| 1997 | Bruno the Kid | Unknown role | Voice, episode: "Book'em Bruno, Murder One" |
| 1998 | Dexter's Laboratory | Toshi, Japanese Dad, Japanese Boy #1 | Voice, episode: "Last But Not Least" |
| 1999 | Batman Beyond | Albino | Voice, episode: "Mind Games" |
| 2000 | The Weekenders | Hiro | Voice, episode: "Sense and Sensitivity" |
| 2000–2001 | Johnny Bravo | Master Hama, Karate Girl | Voice, 4 episodes |
| 2000–2004 | Static Shock | Shiv | Voice, 7 episodes |
| 2002 | Samurai Jack | Kid B, Boy | Voice, episode: "Jack's Shoes" |
| 2002 | The Grim Adventures of Billy & Mandy | Chief, Chef, Announcer | Voice, 2 episodes |
| 2002–2003 | What's New, Scooby-Doo? | J.J Hakimoto | Voice, 2 episodes |
| 2003 | Kim Possible | Hirotaka | Episode: "Exchange" |
| 2003 | Codename: Kids Next Door | Cheese Ninj, Leader | Voice, 2 episodes |
| 2005 | Family Guy | Asian Police Pilot | Voice, episode: "Breaking Out Is Hard to Do" |
| 2005 | All Grown Up! | Tourist Kid #2 | Voice, episode: "R.V. Having Fun Yet" |
| 2005 | Duck Dodgers | The Whoosh | Voice, episode: "Master & Disaster/All in the Crime Family" |
| 2006 | As Told By Ginger | Mr. Briggs, Shop Keeper | Voice, episode: "Stuff'll Kill Ya" |
| 2006–2008 | Avatar: The Last Airbender | Ham Ghao, Than | Voice, 3 episodes |
| 2014 | Under the Table | Himself | 2 episodes |
| 2014 | The Bay | Dr. Kim | Episode: "1.15" |

=== Video games ===
Video games
| Year | Title | Role | Notes |
|---|---|---|---|
| 1998 | Xenogears | Fei Fong Wong | English dub |
| 2002 | EOE: Eve of Extinction | Venom, Raven | English dub |
| 2002 | Bruce Lee: Quest of the Dragon | Additional voices | |
| 2003 | True Crime: Streets of LA | Kang Brother, Additional voices | |
| 2004 | World of Warcraft | Additional voices | |
| 2005 | Area 51 | Additional voices | |
| 2008 | Jumper: Griffin's Story | Paladin, Guard #1, Soldier #1 | |
| 2008 | Command & Conquer: Red Alert 3 | Imperial Ore Collector, Imperial Nanocore | |
| 2008 | Saints Row 2 | Unknown role | |
| 2012 | The Darkness II | Inugami, Additional voices | |
| 2012 | World of Warcraft: Mists of Pandaria | Unknown role | |
