= Earth Star Voyager =

1988 science fiction TV film by James Goldstone

- Genre: Adventure; Biography; Drama; Science Fiction
- Created by: Ed Spielman
- Written by: Ed Spielman
- Directed by: James Goldstone
- Starring: Duncan Regehr; Brian McNamara; Julia Montgomery; Jason Michas; Tom Bresnahan; Margaret Langrick; Sean O'Byrne; Peter Donat
- Theme music composer: Lalo Schifrin
- Country of origin: United States
- Original language: English
- No. of episodes: 2 (aired)

Production
- Executive producer: Martin Starger
- Producer: Howard P. Alston
- Production location: Vancouver
- Cinematography: Robert M. Stevens
- Editors: Edward A. Biery; Edward Nassour
- Running time: 96 minutes (without commercials) (per half)
- Production companies: Marstar Productions; Walt Disney Television

Original release
- Network: ABC
- Release: January 17 – January 24, 1988

Earth Star Voyager is a science fiction television movie shown on The Disney Sunday Movie in 1988, on January 17 and January 24. The show aired as a two-part pilot, but was not picked up for a series.

== Plot ==
In the year 2082, the Earth deep-space exploration vessel, Vanguard Explorer, has suffered heavy damage, due to the efforts of Captain Jacob "Jake" Brown trying to keep his ship out of the hands of mutineers led by his second-in-command, Vance Arthur. Feigning compliance, Jake attacks Vance and knocks him senseless long enough for him to get to an escape pod and launch into space. However, the cause of the damage on board the Vanguard Explorer is unknown.

The German-language VHS introduces the plot: "In year 2087. The Earth is dying. They must find a new planet."

It is now six years later, in the year 2088. Command cadet Jonathan Hays, twenty-one, and his best friend Jessie "Beanie" Bienstock, a 14-year-old computer specialist, are among the young military cadets chosen to serve as the crew of Earth*Star Voyager, the planet's newest interstellar vessel. Due to worsening ecological conditions on Earth, there is a plan in place to evacuate the planet and colonize another world. (This mission is noted on the cover of the German VHS: see image at right). Probes have been sent out six years ago via the Vanguard Explorer, and one has sent data back on Berenson's Star; she has a life-zone planet which has been named "Demeter". The mission of Earth*Star Voyager is to go to Demeter, perform a full planetary survey and return that information because if conditions on Demeter prove accurate (the probe's data indicates that human life could survive on Demeter), then the human race will colonize the world. The plan to colonize Demeter has already begun; ships are already being built to transport the population but will take forty years to complete construction of all the necessary vessels, and the trip to Demeter, with "plasma-thrust" engines and the Bauman Drive (named for Professor Bauman, the creator) will take 26 years. That was the rationale of choosing the crew from the Academy—for their youth and intelligence. Jonathan, as second-in-command, will assume command if Forbes is shown to be unable to continue his duties due to age. It is also mentioned that a modified form of cryogenic suspension will be used by the crew during the voyage in order to slow the ageing process. (Beanie mentions that he'll be forty years old upon their return to Earth, and Captain Forbes also mentions that, although the process will slow their ageing, they will still age.)

Among the crew members are Lani Miyori (a communications specialist) and Luz Sansone, a fellow communications tech who takes an immediate liking to Beanie. Also aboard are Dr. Sally Arthur, a 24-year-old M.D., Huxley Welles, an 18-year-old navigator, and Dr. Leland Eugene, the ship's psychiatrist.

The crew arrives aboard the Earth*Star Voyager, and are met by Captain Forbes (the commanding officer), Brody (the ship's resident physical fitness instructor—crew members are required to engage in a physical fitness program), and "Priscilla", the sentient supercomputer that is the primary logic circuit for the vessel—who has seemingly developed a crush on Huxley. It is mentioned that this was a concern by the programmers; Priscilla is designed from the brain engrams of Priscilla Bauman (the daughter of Professor Bauman), and as such, she has all of the memories, thoughts, feelings and desires of the real Priscilla Bauman. This is slightly annoying to Huxley.

Adm. Beasley, a war hero who fought back a criminal organization called the Outlaw Technology Zone, gave them a final pep-talk and saw them off from his flagship, the Triton Corsair.

Not long after embarking on the mission, the ship has to pass through the junk belt. Immediately entering the belt, the auto-pilot is unable to travel the course plotted because the junk starts to move due to the ship's engines. After the shields and ship take some damage, Jonathan takes manual control and flies the ship through without taking further damage. While checking the repairs on an airlock, Captain Forbes finds himself trapped inside with the system set to open the airlock to space. Moments later, coming to check on the Captain, Jonathan finds him before the airlock opens. Before being blown into space, the Captain tells Jonathan to keep going and to "complete the mission". Jonathan orders the ship's psychiatrist to review the crew's profiles for any hint of psychopathology. Later, Lani mentions to Jonathan that she has suspicions of Dr. Leland Eugene, but Jonathan says he cannot go on a hunch alone. Following this, Lani is critically injured while in cryo-sleep by an apparent malfunction.

Along the way to Demeter, they pick up the long lost astronaut Capt. Jacob "Jake" Brown, while stopping at an abandoned station to make some repairs. Brown initially paralyzes Huxley with a weapon, but it is revealed that he did so to prevent Huxley from walking straight into an "anti-matter zone". Capt. Brown is accepted on board as an advisor to Jonathan and, finding out that the crew is only armed with hand weapons, volunteers to build a rail-gun with the help of Beinstock in an airlock. Jonathan then receives evidence of the death of Capt. Forbes and Lani's coma that points to Leland, the psychiatrist. When Jonathan confronts him, Priscilla calls Jonathan about suspicious activity in the rail-gun's airlock. Jonathan investigates and finds Brody, the fitness instructor, is sabotaging the rail-gun, a fight ensues and the fitness instructor is jettisoned out of the airlock. A transmitter is later discovered amongst his possessions, that he was apparently using to keep in contact with a blip that intermittently appeared on the Voyager's long range scans.

The crew also explores a distress signal from a massive space station known as "the 2020 World's Fair", which is inhabited by warriors and researchers of the Outlaw Technology Zone. The landing party is captured by the warriors after encountering one of Captain Brown's former crew members, Willy. They discover that the mutinous Vance has also landed here and became "Top Dog" of the warriors by employing a stunner much like the one Brown used on Huxley. A warrior, named Whistlestick, who was beaten and humiliated by Vance, explains that anyone may challenge the "Top Dog" at any time. Huxley demonstrates his skill at pickpocketing by getting the key for their cage. Brown offers to occupy their captors by challenging Vance while the rest escape. After a difficult fight, Brown (who taught Vance how to make such weapons long ago) is able to make Vance's weapon backfire and destroys it—but spares Vance's life (unaware that Sally was watching and afraid that he would be killed by Jake). In the ensuing ruckus, the crew and their two new allies escape.

The next discovery, explaining how Vance and Willie got to the World's Fair Station in the first place, was finding the wreckage of the Vanguard Explorer. Capt. Brown requests permission to board it and retrieve his logs to prove that the loss of his ship was due to mutiny, and to see if there was anything left salvageable. Beinstock, the Doctor, and he find the ship to still have some power and computer function, but also find an unwelcome guest known as a "Shell"—a cyborg. Brown is able to shock the Shell into unconsciousness, and Doctor Arthur insists they take him to the ship to help and examine him. In a cut-away scene, it is revealed that Adm. Beasley has become aware of the Shell's presence on Voyager, but is unable to do anything about it.

Willie explains that the Shell is a cyborg created by the O.T.Z. and, although it is only a drone, it is probably packed with explosives. The Doctor, with the help of Beinstock, is able to disarm the explosives and treat his injuries, and is able to bring the Shell back to consciousness while also keeping him immobilized. They interrogate the Shell, and he mentions that his function is to help facilitate "Assembly". Data from the Vanguard indicates that several odd-looking ships passed by the Vanguard from the World's Fair over the last few years. Later analysis indicates the ships are modular. Later on, Dr. Arthur speaks to the Shell and discovers that he was abducted and turned into a cyborg when he was young. After making some small adjustments to him to ease his discomfort, Doctor Arthur and he form a brief emotional connection before his programming returns him to his drone-state. Later, he regains his full movement and smashes his way through the ship, damaging Capt. Brown's jury-rigged railgun weapon and one of Priscilla's processors. The Shell warns them that they must stop "Assembly" then deactivates himself rather than let his programming make him kill Dr. Arthur.

In another cut-away scene, Vance finds himself in dire straits back on the World's Fair as the warriors now hunt him for his treatment of them. Admiral Beasley appears and demands an explanation from him. Their dialogue indicates that the mutiny on the Vanguard Explorer was part of some design of Beasley's and that Beasley is somehow connected, if not in control of, the O.T.Z. After Vance reveals he was defeated by the presumed-dead Capt. Brown, Beasley leaves Vance to his fate, and returns to the Corsair. This scene is left out of some versions of the show.

Back on board Voyager, the crew have made repairs and discover how their spacecraft fits into a conspiracy concocted by the Outlaw Technology Zone and Admiral Beasley, the mastermind behind the entire plot (including the construction of Earth*Star Voyager, the selection of the crew, and the creation of the "Shell"). The O.T.Z. ships, the Assembly, were stationed in a binary solar system to use the light from the stars upcoming alignment to give them sufficient power to join together and form an even more massive and heavily armed ship. A section of the completed Assembly was designed to allow Voyager to fit in near the bow.

Beasley's ship fires warning shots at Voyager to keep them on course to the Assembly, and then he reveals why he had chosen the best and the brightest the world had to offer to crew Voyager. He intended Voyager not to be an exploratory vessel but a colony ship. Joining the Voyager to the O.T.Z. Assembly would give Beasley the Bowman Drive and Priscilla. This would enable him to choose whom else would get to be part of his new Utopia, while leaving the rest of humanity to rot back on Earth.

However, the crew outwits Admiral Beasley and escapes (after a battle in which they use jury-rigged weapons, including a "solar laser" (which can gather and redirect solar energies in a beam-like fashion), and the railgun built by Jake and Beanie). During the battle, Jake nearly sacrifices himself to hold together part of the electrical circuit that allows the railgun to be fired; he is saved by Sally. Aboard the Admiral's damaged vessel, the Triton Corsair, Admiral Beasley acknowledges Jonathan's skill as a commander, and promises that he will meet up with the crew of the Earth*Star Voyager again someday. There is an alternate scene of this in the 120-minute VHS version where Beasley is revealed to be some sort of robot or cyborg (or perhaps himself a Shell), while leaving out the promise dialogue.

Aboard the Earth*Star Voyager, Lani is found to be recovering from her injuries; Beanie and Luz (prodded by Priscilla) become a couple; it is strongly insinuated that Jake and Sally will become a couple; and Huxley is stunned to see that Priscilla (in human form) is a very beautiful woman. Beanie also reveals to Jonathan that he has decrypted the probe data and the crew sees that Demeter is a planet with striking similarities to Earth. The last line of the miniseries goes to Jake, who says, "You know, Captain, I think we oughta go check that place out..."

== Cast and crew ==
Directed by

- James Goldstone

Writing credits

- Ed Spielman

Cast (in credits order)

- Duncan Regehr as Jacob Dryden "Jake" Brown (Former CDR, Vanguard Explorer)
- Brian McNamara as Capt. Jonathan Hays (Commander, Earth*Star Voyager)
- Julia Montgomery as Dr. Sally Arthur, M.D. (Space Medicine)
- Jason Michas as Jessie "Beanie" Bienstock (Computer Sciences)
- Tom Bresnahan as Huxley Welles (Navigation)
- Margaret Langrick as Luz Sansone (Communications)
- Sean O'Byrne as Lt. Vance Arthur (First Officer, Vanguard Explorer)
- Peter Donat as Adm. Beasley

Rest of cast listed alphabetically:

- Dinah Gaston as Lani Miyori (Communications)
- Andrew Kavadas as Brody Arnold (Physical Fitness Technician)
- John "Bear" Curtis as Whistlestick
- Stephen Dimopoulos as The Crier
- Bruce Harwood as Dr. Leland Eugene, M.D. (Psychiatrist)
- Henry Kingi as Shell
- Nigel Harvey as Security Leader
- Barry Kennedy as Lt. Matthews
- Kevin McNulty as CDR. Gardner
- Lynette Mettey as Priscilla (Main Computer)
- Ric Reid as Capt. Forbes
- Frank C. Turner as Willy
- David Paul Hewitt White as Guard
- Jennifer Michas as Jeannie
- Stephen E. Miller as Lt. Krieger
- Enid Saunders as Elderly Woman
- Mike Stack as Crewman #1
- Sandy Tucker as Mrs. Bienstock
- Meredith Bain Woodward as Mrs. Hays

== Additional information ==
Many of the lead actors (at least six) were born in Canada.

The production was shot entirely in Vancouver, Canada and partially filmed inside the Soviet Pavilion built for Expo '86.

The show (240 minutes in four episodes) was screened by the Ostankino 2 channel in Russia in Winter 1993 in their Disney Film Classics series on Fridays.
