= Savage Justice =

- Directed by: Joey Romero
- Produced by: Antony I. Ginnane (executive)
- Starring: Julia Montgomery; Steven Memel; Ruel Vernal
- Release date: 1988
- Countries: United States; Philippines
- Language: English

Savage Justice is a 1988 action film directed by Joey Romero and starring Julia Montgomery and Ruel Vernal. It was shot in the Philippines.
