= Gregg Binkley =

American actor

- Born: March 20, 1963 (age 63); Topeka, Kansas, U.S.
- Occupation: Actor
- Years active: (1988–present)
- Spouse: Tokiko Ohniwa (m. 2003)
- Children: 3
- Awards: Member of the WRHS Hall of Fame

Gregg Binkley (born March 20, 1963) is an American actor. He is known for playing Kenny James on My Name is Earl (2005–2009), Barney on Raising Hope (2010–2014), Harold in Revenge of the Nerds III: The Next Generation (1992), and Dan, the Del Taco spokesperson.

Binkley also runs his own business where he hosts acting workshops and classes.

== Early life and career ==
Binkley grew up in Topeka, Kansas, and graduated from Washburn Rural High School where he served as the class president of 1981. Upon moving to California, he was a contestant on Classic Concentration in May 1988.

He is known for his roles as Kenny James on My Name Is Earl and as Dan, the Del Taco spokesperson. He has also had guest spots on Gilmore Girls, Malcolm in the Middle, Sabrina, the Teenage Witch, Yes, Dear, The Drew Carey Show, Full House, Family Matters and Wizards of Waverly Place.

Binkley once held a job making celebrity impersonation phone calls, posing as Don Knotts' character Barney Fife. Binkley also did this impersonation in Behind the Camera: The Unauthorized Story of Three's Company.

In January 2024, Binkley published a book on acting called Get Your Act Together.

== Personal life ==
He met his wife, Tokiko Ohniwa, in an acting class. They were married on May 31, 2003, and have three children. Gregg is the brother of retired news anchor Mike Binkley.

== Filmography ==
=== Films ===
Year	Film	Role	Director	Notes
1989	C.H.U.D. II: Bud the C.H.U.D.	Teen	David Irving	
1989	How I Got into College	Egghead	Savage Steve Holland	
1995	Dracula: Dead and Loving It	Woodbridge	Mel Brooks	
1998	Running Woman	Lab Technician	Rachel Samuels	
1999	The Moment After	Dr. Jason Hersch	Wes Llewellyn	Credited as Gregg Alex
1999	Family Tree	Bill Belko	Duane Clark	
1999	Galaxy Quest	Fan #3	Dean Parisot	
2001	The Man Who Wasn't There	New Man	Joel and Ethan Coen	
2001	Elvis Took a Bullet	Dr. Jeff Wilkes	Jerry Eeten	
2006	Hidden Secrets	Harold Mirfin	Carey Scott	
2007	The Infamous Buddy Blade	Buddy Blade	Wes Llewellyn	Short film
2008	Changeling	Jury Foreman	Clint Eastwood	
2009	State of Play	Ferris	Kevin Macdonald	
2009	Alvin and the Chipmunks: The Squeakquel	Emcee	Betty Thomas	
2010	Mob Rules	Charlie	Keith Parmer	
2010	Holyman Undercover	Gregg	David A. R. White	
2010	It's a Horrible Life	George	Gregg Binkley	
2013	Escape from Planet Earth	Ralph (voice)	Cal Brunker	Uncredited
2015	Too Hip for the Room	Commercial Auditioner	Kelly Monteith and Oktay Ortabasi	
2016	Café Society	Mike	Woody Allen	
2021	Finding Love in Quarantine: The Movie	Detective Rogers	Matt Shapira	
2025	Recall	John	Vyky Saiz	Short film
2025	Honey Don't!	Horrified Bartender	Ethan Coen	

=== Television ===
Year(s)	Title	Role(s)	Notes
1988	Head of the Class	Nerd	S3E5 "Let's Rap"
1988–1990	Out of This World	Elroy Tanner; Barney	S2E10 "Close Encounters of the Nerd Kind"; S3E23 "My Mother the Con"
1989	Murder, She Wrote	Copy Boy	S6E3 "The Grand Old Lady"
1990–1991	Into the Night Starring Rick Dees	Self; Barney Fife Jr.	4 episodes
1991	Civil Wars	Mark	S1E4 "A Long, Fat Frontal Presentation"
1992	Quantum Leap	Deputy	S4E17 "Roberto! - January 27, 1982"
1992	Revenge of the Nerds III: The Next Generation	Harold Skolnick	TV movie
1992	ABC Saturday Morning Preview Special	Thing	Television special
1993	Full House	Security Guard	S7E9 "The Day of the Rhino"
1994	Revenge of the Nerds IV: Nerds in Love	Harold	TV movie
1994	Coach	Production Assistant	S7E10 "Working Girl"
1995	A Whole New Ballgame		S1E1 "Opening Day"; S1E3 "You Are What You Date"
1996	Pistol Pete	Townperson #2	TV movie
1996	Night Stand with Dick Dietrick	Rod Weiner	S1E46 "Mail Order Brides"
1997	Family Matters	Lionel	S8E14 "Revenge of the Nerd"
1997	Team Knight Rider	Mike the Co-Pilot	S1E4 "K.R.O."
1997	The Drew Carey Show	James	S3E10 "That Thing You Don't"
1999	Working	Larry	S2E15 "The Other Executive"
1999	The Hughleys	Mr. Parker	S2E6 "The Curse of the Coyote Man"
1999	Grown Ups	Clark	S1E9 "Vegas, a Place in the Sun"
2000	18 Wheels of Justice		S1E10 "Games of Chance"
2000	The Michael Richards Show	Dale	S1E6 "It's Only Personal"
2001	Sabrina the Teenage Witch	Staff Member #1	S6E7 "Hex, Lies, and No Video Tape"
2001–2005	Yes, Dear	Man; Mr. Berkowitz	S1E17 "Doctor, Doctor"; S5E11 "Broken by the Mold"
2003	Malcolm in the Middle	Randy	S4E13 "Stereo Store"
2003	Behind the Camera: The Unauthorized Story of Three's Company	Don Knotts	TV movie
2005–2009	My Name Is Earl	Kenny James	18 episodes
2006	Gilmore Girls	Officer Ruskin	S6E22 "Partings"
2008	CSI: Crime Scene Investigation	Street Person #3	S9E3 "Art Imitates Life" (uncredited)
2009	The Bold and the Beautiful	Court Clerk	Episode #5645
2009	Wizards of Waverly Place	Randy	S3E6 "Doll House"
2010–2014	Raising Hope	Barney	Main role; 71 episodes
2011	Pacino & Pacino Talent Agency	Bobby Deerfield	S1E2 "Bobby Deerfield"
2011	ACME Saturday Night	Guest Host	S3E14 "Gregg Binkley"
2013	Going to Bed with Terri Ivens	Self (Guest)	S1E3 "Gregg Binkley"
2014	The Millers	Waiter	S1E23 "Mother's Day"
2014	Perception	Theodore Ludlow	S3E5 "Eternity"
2014	The Legend of Korra	Kong	S3E10 "Long Live the Queen". Credited as Greg Binkley (sic)
2014–2017	Kirby Buckets	Science Teacher; Mr. Jenkins	16 episodes
2015	Transparent	Mateo	S2E3 "New World Coming"
2016–2017	Dads in Parks	Self	7 episodes
2017	Stuck in the Middle	Chester Torvilleton	S2E1 "Stuck in the Waterpark"
2017	Hitting the Breaks	Bernie Beirness	10 episodes
2017	Life After First Failure	Bart	S1E1 "Pilot, Pt. 1"
2017	Malibu Dan the Family Man	Chuck From Accounting	S1E2 "Karl Is Dead"; S1E5 "Babysitting Breakdown"
2020	Finding Love in Quarantine	Security Guard; Detective Rogers	7 episodes
2020	Distance Makes the HeART Grow Fonder	Self	S1E7 "Conversation with Raising Hope Actor Gregg Binkley"
2020–2021	Diary of a Future President	Dr. Cooper	7 episodes
2021	United States of Al	Tom	S1E1 "Pilot"
2021	Brooklyn Nine-Nine	Lyndon Boyle	S8E7 "Game of Boyles"
2022	Roar	Clark	S1E7 "The Woman Who Returned Her Husband"
2022	NCIS: Los Angeles	Navy Lt. Commander Gary Hudson	S13E18 "Hard for the Money"
2022	NCIS	Bob Stivers	S20E8 "Turkey Trot"
2022	The Sex Lives of College Girls	Roy	S2E4 "Will You Be My Girlfriend?"
2023	Young Sheldon	Eric	S6E19 "A New Weather Girl and a Stay-at-Home Coddler"
2025	The Young & the Restless	Elliot Matthison	Episode #13,102

=== Video games ===
Year	Title	Role	Notes
2011	Resistance 3	Stanley; Starving Man (voice)	
