= Julia Montgomery =

American actress (born 1960)

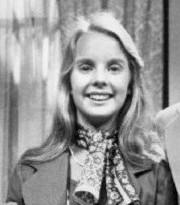
- Montgomery in 1977
- Born: July 2, 1960 (age 66); Kansas City, Missouri, U.S.
- Years active: 1976–present
- Spouse: Jon Reede (m. 1996)
- Children: 2

Julia Montgomery (born July 2, 1960) is an American film and television actress. She first gained public attention for her role as Samantha Vernon on the soap opera One Life to Live (1976–1981, 1987). She subsequently appeared in the slasher film Girls Nite Out (1982), followed by the role of Betty Childs in the comedy film Revenge of the Nerds (1984). Montgomery reprised her role of Betty in the film's third and fourth sequels (1992–1994).

== Life and career ==
Montgomery was born July 2, 1960, in Kansas City, Missouri. Montgomery's first role was on the soap opera One Life to Live as Samantha Vernon from 1976 to 1981. Her well-known film role is in the hit comedy film Revenge of the Nerds (1984) as Betty Childs; she reprised the role in the TV films Revenge of the Nerds III: The Next Generation (1992) and Revenge of the Nerds IV: Nerds in Love (1994). She also played Dr. Sally Arthur, M.D. in Earth Star Voyager (1988), and appeared in the comedy films Up the Creek (1984) and Stewardess School (1986), and the horror films Girls Nite Out (1982) and The Kindred (1987).

Montgomery appeared on multiple television shows, including Columbo; Magnum, P.I.; Midnight Caller; Full House; Cheers and The Honourable Woman.

== Filmography ==
=== Film ===
Year	Title	Role	Notes	Ref.
1981	Senior Trip	Marlene		
1982	Girls Nite Out	Lynn Connors		
1984	Up the Creek	Lisa	As Julie Montgomery	
1984	Anatomy of an Illness	Candis	As Julie Montgomery	
1984	Revenge of the Nerds	Betty Childs	As Julie Montgomery	
1984	Nickel Mountain	Delivery Nurse	As Julie Montgomery	
1986	Stewardess School	Pimmie Polk		
1987	The Kindred	Cindy Russell		
1988	South of Reno	Susan		
1988	Earth Star Voyager	Dr. Sally Arthur		
1988	Savage Justice	Sarah		
1989	Black Snow	Lindsay Deveraux		
1992	Stop! Or My Mom Will Shoot	Secretary		
1992	Revenge of the Nerds III: The Next Generation	Betty Childs-Skolnick		
1994	Revenge of the Nerds IV: Nerds in Love	Betty Childs-Skolnick		
1994	Milk Money	Stacey's Mom		
2012	A Green Story	Lady Customer		
2013	Sharp	Kaitlin Withrow		
2015	Intervention	Mom	Short film	
2016	Altered Reality	Hope		
2016	Appetence	Mrs. Rose	Short film	
2019	One Hot Day	Victoria	Short film	

=== Television ===
Year	Title	Role	Notes	Ref.
1976–1981, 1987	One Life to Live	Samantha Vernon	Series regular	
1985	Remington Steele	Lorraine Maywood	Episode: "Coffee, Tea or Steele"	
1986	Magnum, P.I.	Lydia McCarthy	Episode: "Find Me a Rainbow"	
1986	Murder, She Wrote	Alexandra Bell	Episode: "Dead Man's Gold"	
1986	Who's the Boss?	Casey Fryman	Episode: "Older Than Springtime"	
1988	The Magical World of Disney	Sally Arthur, M.D.	Episode: "Earth Star Voyager"	
1988	In the Heat of the Night	Elmyra Carroway	Episode: "A Necessary Evil"	
1988	Midnight Caller	Kelly West	Episode: "After It Happened"	
1989	Hunter	Dana Lynch	Episode: "Partners"	
1989	Columbo	Cindy	Episode: "Sex and the Married Detective"	
1990	Full House	Adult Steph	Episode: "Those Better Not Be the Days"	
1992	Cheers	Ellen	Episode: "The Beer Is Always Greener"	
1993	Reasonable Doubts	Tina Cassidy	Episode: "Sister, Can You Spare a Dime?"	
2013	Busted Roots	Lillie	Pilot episode	
2016	Dadly	Mom with sons	Episode: "Playdate"	
2022	The Young and the Restless	Tanya	One episode; aired on March 23, 2022	
