= Ted McGinley =

American actor (born 1958)

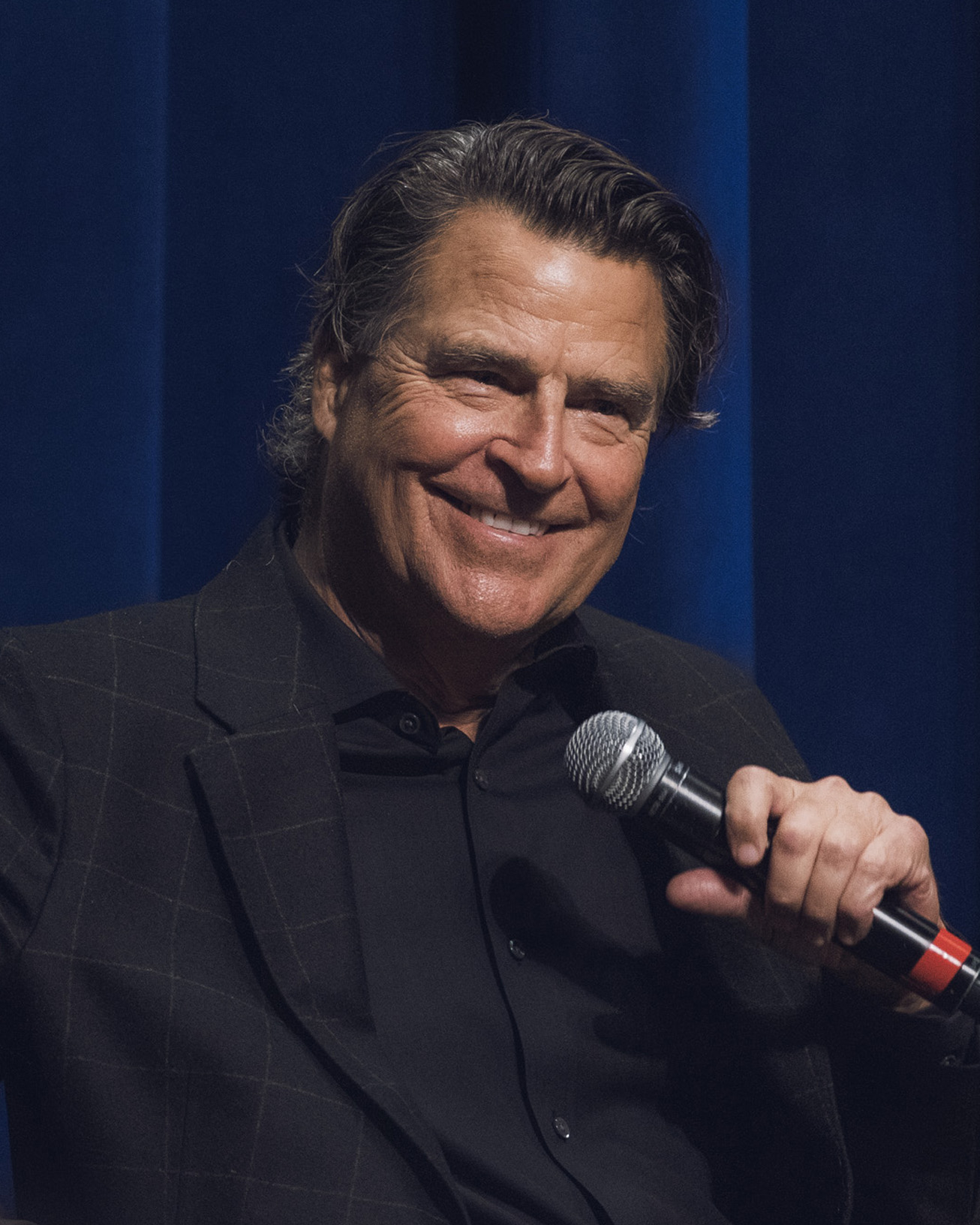
- McGinley in 2024
- Born: Theodore Martin McGinley; May 30, 1958 (age 68); Newport Beach, California, U.S.
- Occupation: Actor
- Years active: 1980–present
- Known for: Married... with Children; Hope & Faith; Happy Days; Shrinking; The Love Boat
- Spouse: Gigi Rice (m. 1991)
- Children: 2

Theodore Martin McGinley (born May 30, 1958) is an American actor. He is known for his roles as Jefferson D'Arcy on the television sitcom Married... with Children, Charley Shanowski on the ABC sitcom Hope & Faith, and Derek Bishop on the Apple TV comedy drama series Shrinking. He was a late regular on Happy Days, Dynasty and The Love Boat and is known for playing the villainous role of Stan Gable in the film Revenge of the Nerds and several made-for-television sequels.

== Early life ==
McGinley was born and raised in Newport Beach, California. His paternal grandfather was an Irish immigrant. He played on the water polo team at Newport Harbor High School. McGinley attended the University of Southern California and played water polo, but after pursuing work as a model, dropped out and moved to New York in 1979.

== Career ==
After a casting director spotted a picture of him in GQ, McGinley was cast on the comedy series Happy Days as Roger Phillips (nephew of Marion Cunningham), a role he played from 1980 to 1984. During the run of Happy Days, he landed a role in the comedy film Young Doctors in Love (1982).

After Happy Days ended in 1984, McGinley appeared in Revenge of the Nerds where he played Stanley Gable, the head of the jock-run Alpha Beta fraternity and the primary antagonist of the Lambda Lambda Lambda nerd fraternity; he reprised the role in the third and fourth films in the "Nerds" franchise, both produced for television. He went on to appear in regular roles on television series including The Love Boat and Dynasty. He then played the role of Al Bundy's best friend and Marcy Rhoades' husband Jefferson D'Arcy on Married... with Children from 1991 to 1997, describing it as a "great, great gig." He had recurring roles on Aaron Sorkin's television series Sports Night as Dana's boyfriend Gordon, and The West Wing as a television news anchor. From 2003 to 2006, he played Charley Shanowski on Hope & Faith.

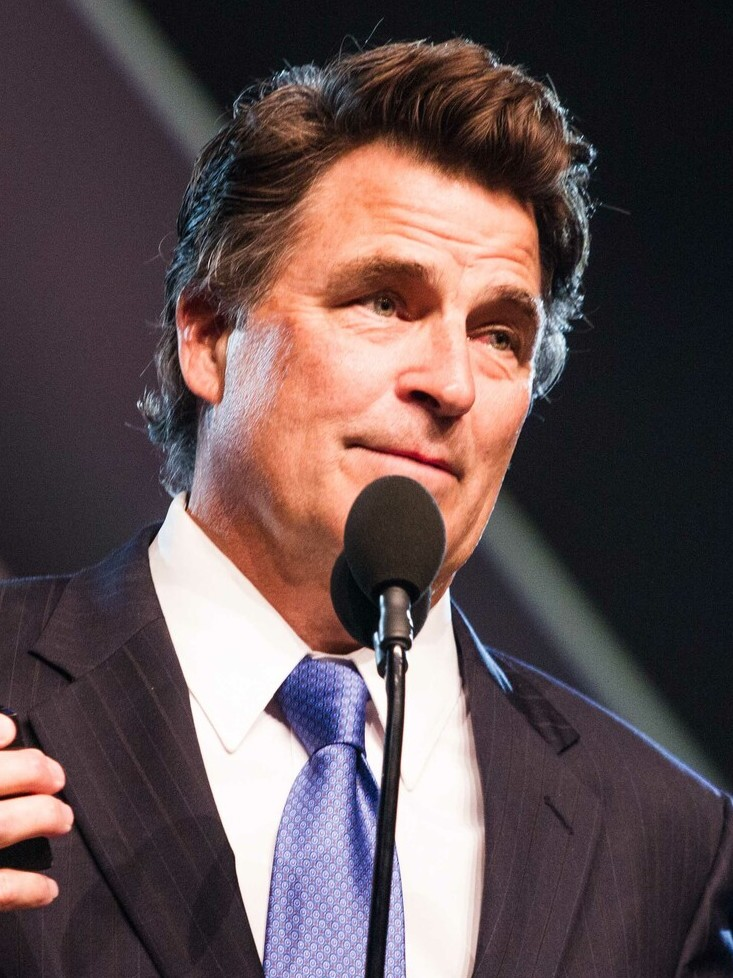
McGinley in 2016

Two years later, he was selected for a role in Charlie Lawrence, a situation comedy about a freshman congressman from New Mexico, played by Nathan Lane. McGinley played Graydon Ford, the neighbor of Lane's title character, who was a member of the opposing political party. McGinley was also in the pilot for the 2002 CBS show Life of the Party, playing a senator.

His guest star roles include series such as Fantasy Island (1982), Hotel (1985–87), Perfect Strangers (1988), B.L. Stryker (1989), Evening Shade (1990), Dream On (1991), The John Larroquette Show (1995–96; 1997–98), The Practice (2001), and Justice League (2002).

During and shortly after the run of Married … With Children, McGinley was a part of many films and television films, playing different types of characters. In 1993, he played Mr. Scream in Wayne's World 2. That same year, McGinley affected a Southern accent in his role in the miniseries Wild Justice, which was poorly received by critics. Some of his television film roles were very dark. In 1996, he was the star of Deadly Web, a film that aired on NBC in 1996 and co–starred his wife, Gigi Rice. The film was about a woman who was stalked on the Internet. McGinley played one of his darkest roles in 1998 in the television film Every Mother's Worst Fear. He played Mitch Carson, a sexual predator who lures a teenage girl into his house, where he holds her captive and tortures her.

In 2008, McGinley became a contestant on the seventh season of Dancing with the Stars, and was paired with pro dancer Inna Brayer. He was the second contestant to be eliminated in the competition.

=== "Jumping the Shark" ===
McGinley was called "the patron saint of shark-jumping" by jumptheshark.com founder Jon Hein. This is a reference to the several instances McGinley joined popular television programs in their final years, often to replace a departing regular cast member. Hein explains he is not making any comment "on Ted's fine acting skills" and furthermore notes that "[McGinley] has a great sense of humor about it, too." In one episode of Married... with Children, McGinley himself spoofed this reputation by asking Al Bundy, "Another picture, Captain? I mean, Fonzie? ....Al?" In 2003, McGinley told Melanie McFarland of the Seattle Post-Intelligencer, "I've had a lot of fun with it. To be honest with you, it's meant people are still talking about me. It's kind of doing me a favor. And people keep hiring me, so I know that I'm okay, jumping the shark."

In 2011, McGinley again made fun of his "shark-jumping" abilities in "Mitefall!", the final episode of Batman: The Brave and the Bold. In the episode, Bat-Mite (voiced by Paul Reubens) wants the show to be cancelled to usher in a new TV show called Beware the Batman. To that end, he starts replacing aspects of the show, including switching Aquaman's regular voice actor, John DiMaggio, with McGinley. Ambush Bug (voiced by McGinley's Happy Days co-star Henry Winkler) helps to reverse the situation, in part by getting McGinley to break character and leave, forcing DiMaggio's voice back into Aquaman.

== Personal life ==
McGinley married actress Gigi Rice in 1991 and they have two sons, Beau (born 1994) and Quinn. They reside in Los Angeles.

== Filmography ==
=== Film ===
Year	Film	Role	Notes
1982	Young Doctors in Love	Dr. Bucky DeVol	
1984	Revenge of the Nerds	Stanley Harvey "Stan" Gable	
1989	Troop Beverly Hills	Himself	
1989	Physical Evidence	Kyle D.E. Roache	
1991	Blue Tornado	Phillip	
1992	Space Case	Biff	Alternative title: Alien Invasion
1993	Wayne's World 2	Mr. Scream	
1998	Follow Your Heart	James Allen Bailey	
1998	Major League: Back to the Minors	Leonard Huff	Alternative title: Major League III
1999	Dick	Roderick	
1999	The Big Tease	Johnny Darjerling	
2000	Face the Music	Marcus	
2000	Daybreak	Dillon Johansen	Alternative title: Rapid Transit
2001	Cahoots	Brad	
2001	Pearl Harbor	Army Major	
2007	The Storm Awaits	Vale Newcastle	
2008	Eavesdrop	Grant	
2000	Privileged	Mr. Webber	
2010	Christmas with a Capital C	Dan Reed	
2010	Scooby-Doo! Curse of the Lake Monster	Thornton Blake V / Uncle Thorny	Voice
2013	Bad Behavior	Bruce	
2014	Reedemed	Paul Tyson	
2015	Do You Believe?	Matthew	
2015	Underdog Kids	Barry Hershfeld	
2016	Expendable Assets	Carter	
2017	Area of Conflict	Carter	
2017	The Outcasts	Principal Whitmore	
2018	God's Not Dead: A Light in Darkness	Thomas Ellsworth	
2018	A.X.L.	George Fontaine	

=== Television ===
Year	Title	Role	Notes
1980–1984	Happy Days	Roger Phillips	61 episodes
1982	Fantasy Island	Errol Brookfield III	Episode: "The Kleptomaniac/Thank God, I'm a Country Girl"
1983	Making of a Male Model	Gary Angelo	Television film
1983–1987	The Love Boat	Photographer Ashley "Ace" Covington Evans	60 episodes
1985–1987	Hotel	Kyle Stanton	3 episodes
1986–1987	Dynasty	Clay Fallmont	34 episodes
1988	Perfect Strangers	Billy Appleton	Episode: "My Brother, Myself"
1989	B.L. Stryker	Mitch Slade	2 episodes
1989, 1991–1997	Married... with Children	Norman Jablonsky	Episode: "It's a Bundyful Life"
1989, 1991–1997	Married... with Children	Jefferson D'Arcy	167 episodes
1990	Evening Shade	Kyle Hampton	Episode: "The Moustache Show"
1991	Baby Talk	Craig Palmer	Episode: "Baby Love"
1992	Revenge of the Nerds III: The Next Generation	Dean Stanley Harvey "Stan" Gable	Television film
1993	Wild Justice	Aubrey Billings	Television film
1993	Linda	Brandon "Jeff" Jeffries	Television film
1994	Revenge of the Nerds IV: Nerds in Love	Stanley Harvey "Stan" Gable	Television film
1995	Dream On	Chad Spencer	Episode: "Long Distance Runaround"
1995	Tails You Live, Heads You're Dead	Jeffrey Quint	Television film
1995–1996	The John Larroquette Show	Karl Reese	4 episodes
1996	Deadly Web	Peter Lawrence	Television film
1998	Every Mother's Worst Fear	Scanman	Television film
1998–1999	Sports Night	Gordon	8 episodes
1999	Work with Me	Murray Epstein	Episode: "Pilot"
1999	Hard Time: Hostage Hotel	FBI Agent Hopkins	Television film
2000–2001	The West Wing	Mark Gottfried	3 episodes
2001	The Practice	Michael Hale	Episode: "Awakenings"
2002	Wednesday 9:30 (8:30 Central)	Ted Wayne Giblen	1 episode
2002–2003	Justice League	Tom Turbine, Burns	Voice, 3 episodes
2003	Frozen Impact	Dan Blanchard	Television film
2003	Charlie Lawrence	Graydon Ford	7 episodes
2003	The Proud Family	Lance McDougal	Voice, episode: "Smackmania 6: Mongo vs. Mama's Boy"
2003–2006	Hope & Faith	Dr. Charley Shanowski	73 episodes
2004	NTSB: The Crash of Flight 323	Reese Faulkner	Television film
2007–2008	Family Guy	Helicopter Rental Agent / McStroke Receptionist	Voice, 2 episodes
2007	'Til Death	Webby	Episode: "Webby's Not Happy"
2007	The Note	Kingston "King" Danville	Television film
2008	Dancing with the Stars	Himself (contestant)	2 episodes
2009	Psych	Randy Labayda	Episode: "Six Feet Under the Sea"
2009	The Note II: Taking a Chance on Love	Kingston "King" Danville	Television film
2010	Wizards of Waverly Place	Superintendent Clanton	Episode: "Western Show"
2010	Melissa & Joey	Mayor	Episode: "In Lennox We Trust"
2011	Breaking In	Larry	Episode: "White on White on White"
2011	Batman: The Brave and the Bold	Himself as Aquaman	Voice, episode: "Mitefall!"
2012	Notes from the Heart Healer	Kingston "King" Danville	Television film
2012	The Mentalist	Ed Hunt	Episode: "If It Bleeds, It Leads"
2012	Sullivan & Son	Eugene Casternakie	Episode: "The Bar Birthday"
2013	A Mother's Rage	Stan	Television film
2013	Mad Men	Mel	Episode: “To Have and to Hold"
2014	Castle	Brock Harmon	Episode: "Last Action Hero"
2015–2017	Transformers: Robots in Disguise	Denny Clay, Ship Captain	Voice, 54 episodes
2015	The Bridge	Charlie Bartons	Television film
2016	The Bridge Part 2	Charlie Bartons	Television film
2016	No Tomorrow	Greg Covington	Recurring role
2017	Fatherly Obsession	Robert J. Farnsworth	Television film
2019	Hawaii Five-0	FBI Special Agent Sam Collins	Episode: "Ho'opio 'ia e ka noho ali'i a ka ua"
2019	No Good Nick	Sam	Recurring role
2019	Christmas Reservations	Duffy Johnson	Television film
2020	Mom	Dr. Berenson	Episode: "Cheddar Cheese and a Squirrel Circus"
2021–2022	Keeping Up with the Joneses	Webb	Recurring role
2023–present	Shrinking	Derek	Main role
2023	Platonic	Johnny Rev	Episode: "San Diego"
2024	The Baxters	John Baxter	Lead role
