= Robert Carradine =

American actor (1954–2026)

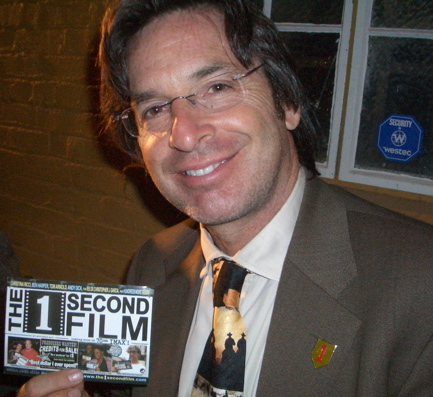
- Carradine holding a producer credit for The 1 Second Film in 2004
- Born: March 24, 1954; Los Angeles, California, U.S.
- Died: February 23, 2026 (aged 71); Los Angeles, California, U.S.
- Occupation: Actor
- Years active: 1971–2026
- Spouse: Edith "Edie" Mani (m. 1990; div. 2018)
- Children: 3, including Ever Carradine
- Family: Carradine family

Robert Reed Carradine (/ˈkærədiːn/ KARR-ə-deen; March 24, 1954 – February 23, 2026) was an American actor. He made his first appearances in television Western series, such as Bonanza and his brother David's television series, Kung Fu. Carradine starred as Lewis Skolnick in teen comedy film series Revenge of the Nerds and Sam McGuire in Disney Channel sitcom series Lizzie McGuire. He was also a member of Carradine family.

== Early life ==
Robert Reed Carradine was born on March 24, 1954, in the city of Los Angeles, to actress and artist Sonia Sorel (née Henius) and actor John Carradine. He is one of many actors in Carradine family. His full brothers are Christopher and Keith Carradine. He also had his two paternal half-brothers, Bruce Carradine and David Carradine, and a maternal half-brother named Michael Bowen. Carradine was also an uncle of actress Martha Plimpton. His maternal great-grandfather Max Henius, was a biochemist, and his maternal great-grandmother was the sister of historian Johan Ludvig Heiberg.

Carradine's parents divorced when he was two. A bitter custody dispute ended with his father gaining custody of him and his two older brothers, Christopher and Keith. During the proceedings, the three sons spent three months in a home for abused children as wards of the court. His older brother, Keith, later recalled the experience: "It was like being in jail. There were bars on the windows, and we were only allowed to see our parents through glass doors. It was very sad. We would stand there on either side of the glass door crying".

He was raised primarily by his stepmother, his father's third wife, Doris Grimshaw, and believed she was his mother until he met Sonia Sorel at a Christmas party when he was 14. While still in high school, he lived with his half-brother David in Laurel Canyon, Los Angeles. Under David's care, he pursued two of his major interests: race-car driving and music. He and David performed together in a musical quartet that played small clubs in Los Angeles and San Francisco.

== Career ==
=== Film ===
Carradine made his film debut in 1972 in The Cowboys, starring John Wayne. He also appeared in a short‑lived television series of the same name based on the film. He later played a killer in Martin Scorsese's Mean Streets, shooting the character portrayed by his brother David.

During this period, he worked with David on several independent projects, including the biker film You and Me (1975) and an unreleased musical titled A Country Mile. He also did camera work for David's Vietnam War-inspired film Americana, which was not released until 1983.

In 1976, Carradine had the chance to demonstrate what he described as his "first ambition", car racing, when he played Jim Cantrell in Paul Bartel's Cannonball. His character wins the cross-country road race, beating the favorite, Coy "Cannonball" Buckman, played by David. In 1977, Robert appeared in the killer-whale thriller Orca.

Carradine joined other Hollywood offspring in 1977 film Joyride, starring alongside Desi Arnaz Jr., Melanie Griffith, and Anne Lockhart in a story about young Californians traveling to Washington and Alaska to seek their fortunes. In 1978, he landed a role in Hal Ashby's Oscar-winning Vietnam War drama Coming Home, starring Jane Fonda and Jon Voight. His performance led to speculation declaring him the strongest actor in the Carradine family.

Carradine played a key role in assembling one of the most unusual casting ensembles in film history when he and his two brothers David and Keith portrayed the Younger brothers in The Long Riders (1980), alongside three other sets of acting brothers: Stacy and James Keach, Dennis and Randy Quaid, and Christopher and Nicholas Guest.

Also in 1980, he co-starred with Mark Hamill and Lee Marvin in Samuel Fuller's The Big Red One, a World War II drama based on Fuller's own experiences. Carradine's character, modeled on Fuller, narrates the film.

In 1983, he starred opposite Cherie Currie of the Runaways in the science fiction film Wavelength, playing a washed‑up rock musician who helps extraterrestrials escape from a military base. He performed several of his own compositions for the film, including one named after his daughter Ever. That same year, he appeared as the love interest in the Motels' music video for the song "Suddenly Last Summer."

In 1984, he starred as Lewis Skolnick in Revenge of the Nerds, becoming one of his most successful roles. To prepare for the role, he spent time at the University of Arizona during rush week; no fraternity selected him, reinforcing his sense that he was right for the part. He reprised the role in three sequels, serving as executive producer on the latter two.

In 2000, Carradine co-starred with Caroline Rhea in Disney Channel Original Movie Mom's Got a Date with a Vampire. In 2001, while appearing in Lizzie McGuire, he portrayed Max's father Donald Keeble in Max Keeble's Big Move. In 2003, he reprised his role as Sam McGuire in Disney's teen comedy film The Lizzie McGuire Movie.

=== Television ===
Carradine's first television appearance came in 1971, such as in Western series Bonanza. Later, he appeared in his brother David's series Kung Fu as Sunny Jim, the mute companion of Serenity Johnson, played by their father, John Carradine, in the 1972 episode "Dark Angel". In 1979, he appeared alongside Melissa Sue Anderson in The Survival of Dana. In 1984, he portrayed Robert Cohn in the television miniseries adaption of Ernest Hemingway's The Sun Also Rises. He also appeared in the 1987 HBO miniseries Conspiracy: The Trial of the Chicago 8. Carradine guest-starred in the Law & Order: Criminal Intent episode "Gone" (2005), playing a character loosely based on Bobby Fischer, and appeared in the television series Jane Doe, directed by James A. Contner, in 2007.

From 2001 to 2004, Carradine portrayed as father Sam McGuire in Disney Channel sitcom series Lizzie McGuire, starring with Hallie Todd, Hilary Duff, and Jake Thomas. This series is widely popular among young viewers, and its realistic portrayal of adolescent issues also appealed to parents. Later, he appeared in ER episode "Sleepless in Chicago" alongside his Revenge of the Nerds co-star Anthony Edwards.

In January 2013, Carradine reunited with Revenge of the Nerds co-star Curtis Armstrong to host King of the Nerds on TBS, a reality competition series. In 2015, he appeared on a fourth-season episode of Celebrity Wife Swap with Hall of Fame wide receiver Terrell Owens.

== Personal life ==
Carradine had three children. His eldest daughter, Ever Carradine, was born in 1974, with Susan Snyder. Ever is also an actress, known for her roles in The Handmaid's Tale and Runaways. In 1990, Carradine married Edith "Edie" Mani, and they had two children together, Marika and Ian. The couple filed to divorce in 2015, finalizing it three years later.

== Mental health problems and death ==
Carradine was diagnosed with bipolar disorder for two decades. A statement from Carradine's family, as paraphrased by USA Today, said his death was "the culmination of a longtime battle with mental illness".

In 2015, Carradine and his then-wife, Edith, were both injured in a car crash in Colorado. In the aftermath of accident, Robert was issued a citation and was ordered to pay a fine. Edith alleged in divorce court documents that Carradine had confessed to intentionally driving into the truck in a murder-suicide attempt, and that his bipolar disorder worsened after he became depressed following the death of his oldest paternal half-brother David Carradine.

On January 17, 2026, Carradine was found unresponsive and in cardiac arrest after checking into UCLA's Resnick Psychiatric Hospital, a day before. He was admitted to ICU, where his condition continued to decline until his death on February 23 of the same year, at the age of 71. His cause and manner of death was ruled as suicide by hanging, confirmed by People Magazine and as well as Los Angeles County Medical Examiner. He was cremated and his whole ashes were scattered into the sea.

In August 2026, his family filed a wrongful death lawsuit against the hospital for failing to remove his belt when Carradine admitted himself.

== Filmography ==
Key
†	Denotes films that have not yet been released

=== Film ===
Year	Title	Role	Notes	Ref.
1972	The Cowboys	Slim Honeycutt – Cowboy		
1973	Mean Streets	Boy with Gun		
1974	You and Me	Gas Station attendant	Credited as Bob Carradine	
1975	Aloha Bobby and Rose	Moxey		
1976	Revenge of the Cheerleaders	Student in Cafeteria	Uncredited	
1976	Jackson County Jail	Bobby Ray		
1976	The Pom Pom Girls	Johnnie		
1976	Cannonball!	Jim Crandell		
1976	Massacre at Central High	Spoony		
1977	Joyride	John		
1977	Orca	Ken		
1978	Coming Home	Bill Munson		
1978	Blackout	Christie		
1980	The Long Riders	Bob Younger		
1980	The Big Red One	Private Zab – 1st Squad		
1981	Heartaches	Stanley Howard		
1982	Tag: The Assassination Game	Alex Marsh		
1983	Wavelength	Bobby Sinclair		
1984	Revenge of the Nerds	Lewis		
1984	Just the Way You Are	Sam Carpenter		
1987	Number One with a Bullet	Detective Barzak		
1987	Revenge of the Nerds II: Nerds in Paradise	Lewis		
1988	Buy & Cell	Herbie Altman		
1989	All's Fair	Mark		
1989	Rude Awakening	Sammy Margolin		
1992	Revenge of the Nerds III: The Next Generation	Lewis		
1992	The Player	Robert Carradine		
1993	The Tommyknockers	Bryant Brown		
1994	Revenge of the Nerds IV: Nerds in Love	Lewis		
1995	Bird of Prey	Eric Parker		
1995	The Killers Within	Ben Wallace		
1996	Escape from L.A.	Skinhead		
1997	Firestorm	Tarmac		
1998	Scorpio One	Carter		
1998	The Effects of Magic	Roody		
1998	Breakout	Zack Hadley	Direct-to-video	
1999	Palmer's Pick-Up	Bruce Palmer		
1999	Gunfighter	The Kid		
1999	Lycanthrope	Bill Parker	Also producer	
1999	The Kid with X-ray Eyes	Chuck Taylor	Direct-to-video	
1999	Stray Bullet	John Burnside		
1999	The Vegas Connection	Matt Chance		
2000	Dangerous Curves	John Burnside		
2001	Ghosts of Mars	Rodale		
2001	Max Keeble's Big Move	Don Keeble		
2002	Three Days of Rain	Bus Driver	Uncredited	
2003	The Lizzie McGuire Movie	Sam McGuire		
2003	Timecop: The Berlin Decision	Big Jim	Direct-to-video	
2005	Supercross	Clay Sparks		
2006	Hoboken Hollow	Thad Simmons		
2006	Monster Night	George Ackerman	Direct-to-video	
2007	7-10 Split	Mr. Bailey		
2007	Tooth and Nail	Darwin		
2007	Sex and Breakfast	Angry Driver		
2008	The 13th Alley	Hal		
2008	Deep Winter	Coach Dando		
2010	The Terror Experiment	Dr. Wexler		
2011	Final Sale	Bownman		
2011	Fancypants	Allen		
2011	Cross	Dr. Zyal	Direct-to-video	
2011	My Dog's Christmas Miracle	Professor Jerry Meinhardt	Direct-to-video	
2012	Slumber Party Slaughter	Dave		
2012	Bikini Spring Break	Gill	Direct-to-video	
2012	Django Unchained	Tracker		
2012	The Collector	Johnny	Short film	
2017	A Fish Tale	Anthony		
2017	Justice	Stratton Collins		
2019	The Marshal	Frank James		
2019	Nearly Departed	Marv		
2019	American Christmas	Danny		
2020	Human Zoo	Producer		
2021	High Holiday	Hunter Pearson		
2024	The Night They Came Home	Bart		
2024	Was Once a Hero	Doc Jennings		
2025	Let's Call the Whole Thing Off	Bill		
2026	Skate to Hell	Virgil		
2026	Pay to Die	Officer		
2026	The Cowboy Killer	Detective Flannery	Posthumous release	
2026	Night of the Rising Dead	Bill	Posthumous release	
TBA	Sorority Shark Attack †	Professor Marvin	Post-production; posthumous release	

=== Television ===
Year	Title	Role	Notes	Ref.
1971	Bonanza	Phinney McLean	Episode: "A Home for Jamie"	
1972	Footsteps	Gas Station Attendant	Television film	
1972	Kung Fu	Sonny Jim	Episode: "Dark Angel"	
1973	Go Ask Alice	Bill	Television film	
1974	The Cowboys	Slim	Series regular (12 episodes)	
1975	The Hatfields and McCoys	Bob Hatfield	Television film	
1975	Run, Joe, Run	Flip	Episode: "The Runaway"	
1976	Police Story	Clifford	2 episodes	
1979	Survival of Dana	Donny Davis	Television film	
1981	Jack London's Tales of the Klondike	Percy Cuthfert III	Miniseries; episode: "In a Far Country"	
1984	The Fall Guy	Gardner	Episode: "October the 31st"	
1984	The Sun Also Rises	Robert Cohn	Miniseries	
1985	Alfred Hitchcock Presents	Jerry	Episode: "Night Fever"	
1986	The Twilight Zone	Daniel Arnold (segment "Still Life")	Episode: "Still Life / The Little People of Killany Woods / The Misfortune Cookie"	
1984	Faerie Tale Theatre	Aladdin	Episode: "Aladdin and His Wonderful Lamp"	
1986	As Is	Rich	Television film	
1986	Monte Carlo	Bobby Morgan	2 episodes	
1987	The Magical World of Disney	John Fairfield	Episode: "The Liberators"	
1987	Conspiracy: The Trial of the Chicago 8	Rennie Davis	Television documentary	
1988	Totally Minnie	Maxwell Dwebb	Television film	
1988	I Saw What You Did	Adrian Lancer	Television film	
1989	The Hitchhiker	Frank	Episode: "Garter Belt"	
1990	The Incident	Domsczek	Television film	
1990	Somebody Has to Shoot the Picture	Police Sergeant Jerry Brown	Television film	
1990	Clarence	Clarence Odbody	Television film	
1991	K-9	Jack Bergin	Television film	
1991	Doublecrossed	Dave Booker	Television film	
1992	Revenge of the Nerds III: The Next Generation	Lewis "Lew" Skolnick	Television film	
1992	Illusions	Greg – Husband	Television film	
1993	The Tommyknockers	Bryant Brown	Miniseries (2 episodes)	
1993	Body Bags	Bill (segment "The Gas Station)	Television film	
1993	The Disappearance of Christina	Michael Croft	Television film	
1994	Revenge of the Nerds IV: Nerds in Love	Lewis Skolnick	Television film; also co-producer	
1994	A Part of the Family	Ted	Television film	
1995	Sirens	Detective Marty Manger	Episode: "Angel Falling"	
1995	ER	John Koch	Episode: "Sleepless in Chicago"	
1995	Lois & Clark: The New Adventures of Superman	Joey Bermuda / The Handyman	Episode: "Home Is Where the Hurt Is"	
1995–96	Kung Fu: The Legend Continues	Taige / Paulson	2 episodes	
1996	Humanoids from the Deep	Wade Parker	Television film	
1996	Dark Skies	Lonnie Zamora	Episode: "Hostile Convergence"	
1997	The Pretender	Sheriff Dwight Kunkle	Episode: "Mirage"	
1997	NYPD Blue	Gerard Salter	Episode: "What a Dump!"	
1997	The Practice	Dr. Red Manheim	Episode: "Dog Bite"	
1997–98	Fast Track	unknown role	2 episodes	
1997–2000	Nash Bridges	Dr. Bruce Hartman / Dr. Hartman, D.D.S.	2 episodes	
1998	Young Hearts Unlimited	Eddie	Television film	
1998	Martian Law	Unknown role	Television film	
1999	Vengeance Unlimited	Darin Carter	Episode: "Friends"	
2000	Mom's Got a Date with a Vampire	Malachi Van Helsing	Television film	
2000	E! True Hollywood Story	Himself	Episode: "David Carradine"	
2001–04	Lizzie McGuire	Sam McGuire	Main role; 65 episodes; director: "Lizzie's Eleven"	
2003	Monte Walsh	Sunfish Perkins	Television film	
2005	Law & Order: Criminal Intent	David Blake / Roger Withers	Episode: "Gone"	
2005	Attack of the Sabertooth	Grant	Television film	
2006	Dreamweaver	The Interpreter	Television film	
2007	Jane Doe: Ties That Bind	Everett / Gary / David	Television film	
2008	Robot Chicken	Lewis Skolnick / Man / Chef	Voice; episode: "Boo Cocky"	
2011	Workers' Comp	Kevin	Television film	
2012	Jesse Stone: Benefit of the Doubt	Arthur Gallery	Television film	
2013–15	King of the Nerds	Himself / host	Series regular (24 episodes); executive producer (8 episodes)	
2013	Celebrity Ghost Stories	Himself	Episode: "Marlee Matlin / Kim Carnes / Robert Carradine"	
2014	Sharktopus vs. Pteracuda	Dr. Rico Symes	Television film	
2015	Celebrity Wife Swap	Himself	Episode: "Robert Carradine / Terrell Owens"	
2016	Medinah	Russo	Episode: "Problem with the World"	
2017	Mommy, I Didn't Do It	Judge Roth	Television film	
2017	Doubt	Walter Costello	Episode: "Finally"	
2017	Doomsday	Alexander Baird	Television film	
2018	James Blondes	Jungle Whisper	Episode: "Blondes in the Jungle"	
2019	Tales of the Wild West	Robert Carradine / Frank James	2 episodes	

== Awards and nominations ==
Year	Award	Category	Nominated work	Result
1982	3rd Genie Awards	Best Performance by a Foreign Actor	Heartaches	Nominated
1987	8th CableACE Awards	Best Actor in a Theatrical or Dramatic Special	As Is	Nominated
1998	16th Golden Boot Awards	—N/a	—N/a	Honored
