= Lambda Lambda Lambda =

American coed collegiate social fraternity

- ΛΛΛ
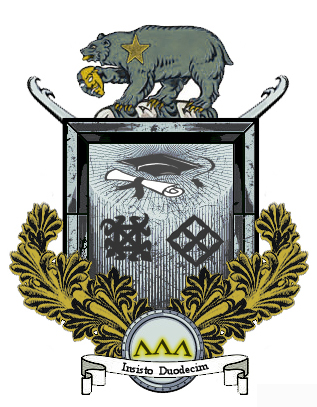
- Founded: January 15, 2006; 20 years ago University of Connecticut
- Type: Social
- Affiliation: Independent
- Status: Active
- Scope: National
- Motto: "Follow the Twelve"
- Colors: Black and Old Gold
- Symbol: Bear
- Chapters: 5
- Nickname: Tri-Lambs
- Headquarters: Storrs, Connecticut 06269; United States
- Website: Tri Lambda website

Lambda Lambda Lambda (ΛΛΛ or Tri-Lambs) is a national collegiate co-ed social fraternity founded on January 15, 2006 on the main campus of the University of Connecticut in Storrs, Connecticut. Tri-Lambs does not discriminate based on race, gender, religion, class, gender identity, or sexual orientation.

== History ==
Inspired by the movies Revenge of the Nerds and National Lampoon's Animal House, Lambda Lambda Lambda is a small co-ed social fraternity, unaffiliated with the Interfraternity and Panhellenic Councils, dedicated to the enjoyment and enrichment of pop culture and to the camaraderie of its members. The Alpha chapter was founded as a student group at the University of Connecticut on January 15, 2006 by ten members, nine male and one female. The fraternity was founded on changing what a fraternity is back to its original meaning. The "openness of the fraternity" leads it to be a place in which to create a "network of support" among its brothers and sisters.

The Beta chapter at SUNY Buffalo was chartered in the fall of 2008. This was followed by chapters at University of Maryland, Baltimore County; Western Washington University; and Bowie State University. Chapters that fail to induct new members became inactive, as occurred with the Beta chapter.

== Membership ==
Consistent with the founding ideals of the fraternity, Lambda Lambda Lambda has historically included a range of students in its ranks. Tri-Lambs does not discriminate based on race, gender, religion, class, gender identity, or sexual orientation. While each sister or brother is chosen to join the fraternity, the opportunity to rush is afforded to all students in a chapter's jurisdiction, and selection is made based on that individual's merits.

Sisters and brothers of Lambda Lambda Lambda must be inducted by a chapter accredited by the national fraternity. Individual chapters may stipulate requirements for eligibility within the precepts of the mission of the organization. Typically, a group of students is selected from the pool of interested and eligible candidates by active members of the chapter. Following this selection these individuals learn about the organization before their formal induction into the fraternity.

== Governance ==
The fraternity is governed by the University of Connecticut's Alpha chapter. A group of officers presides over all matters internally and externally with changes to the organization's running being decided by majority vote at chapter meetings achieving a quorum of active sisters or brothers. The Alpha chapter is also responsible for colonization and induction of new chapters. Historically, a representative of the Alpha chapter has guided the first class of new chapters into the fraternity before that chapter embarks on the task of self-governance.

== Chapters ==
Following is a list of the chapters of Lambda Lambda Lambda. Active chapters are indicated in bold. Inactive chapters are indicated in italics.

Chapter	Charter date and range	Institution	Location	Status	Ref.
**Alpha**	January 15, 2006	University of Connecticut	Storrs, Connecticut	Active	
Beta	2008–20xx ?	State University of New York at Buffalo	Buffalo, New York	Inactive	
**Gamma**	January 14, 2012	University of Maryland, Baltimore County	Catonsville, Maryland	Active	
**Delta**	January 14, 2012	Western Washington University	Bellingham, Washington	Active	
**Epsilon**	January 14, 2012	Bowie State University	Bowie, Maryland	Active	

== See also ==
- List of social fraternities
