= Revenge of the Nerds =

1984 American film by Jeff Kanew

- Theatrical release poster
- Directed by: Jeff Kanew
- Screenplay by: Steve Zacharias; Jeff Buhai
- Story by: Tim Metcalfe; Miguel Tejada-Flores; Steve Zacharias; Jeff Buhai
- Produced by: Ted Field; Peter Samuelson
- Starring: Robert Carradine; Anthony Edwards; Ted McGinley; Bernie Casey
- Cinematography: King Baggot
- Edited by: Alan Balsam
- Music by: Thomas Newman
- Production companies: 20th Century-Fox; Interscope Communications
- Distributed by: 20th Century-Fox
- Release date: July 20, 1984
- Running time: 90 minutes
- Country: United States
- Language: English
- Budget: $6–8 million
- Box office: $40.9 million

Revenge of the Nerds is a 1984 American comedy film directed by Jeff Kanew and written by Steve Zacharias and Jeff Buhai. The film stars Robert Carradine, Anthony Edwards, Ted McGinley, and Bernie Casey. Set at the fictional Adams College, the film follows a group of socially awkward students who form their own fraternity to counter ongoing harassment from the dominant Alpha Beta fraternity and its sister sorority, Pi Delta Pi.

Inspired by a magazine article about computer programmers in Silicon Valley, the film was produced by 20th Century Fox and shot primarily at the University of Arizona and Old Tucson Studios. Made on a reported budget of $6–8 million, it was released theatrically on July 20, 1984, and grossed approximately $40.9 million in the United States and Canada.

Upon release, Revenge of the Nerds received generally negative reviews, with criticism directed at its sexual content and use of racial and gender stereotypes, though some reviewers praised its underdog premise and satirical elements. In the decades since, the film has been reassessed as a cult comedy and a notable entry in the "slobs vs. snobs" subgenre of 1980s teen films. Its legacy has included three sequels, an unaired television pilot, attempted remakes and reboots, and the founding of a real-life Lambda Lambda Lambda fraternity inspired by the film.

== Plot ==
Nerdy freshmen Lewis Skolnick and Gilbert Lowe enroll at Adams College in Tucson to study computer science, meet women, and become adults. The jock Alpha Beta fraternity, led by star quarterback Stan Gable, accidentally burns down its house and, with Coach Harris's support, violently takes over the freshman dormitory as a replacement, forcing Lewis, Gilbert, and the other new students to live in the gym. While many students are taken in by fraternities, Stan's girlfriend, Betty Childs, tricks Lewis and Gilbert into pledging Alpha Beta, leading to their hazing and humiliation. Despite this, Lewis becomes attracted to Betty, while Gilbert grows close to fellow nerd Judy.

Out of options, Lewis, Gilbert, and their fellow nerds—including shy genius Arnold Poindexter, child prodigy Harold Wormser, lewd misfit Dudley "Booger" Dawson, flamboyant Lamar Latrelle, and quiet outsider Toshiro Takashi—rent and renovate a dilapidated house near campus. They attempt to form their own fraternity but are rejected by the college's Greek Council, presided over by Stan, because they lack backing from a national fraternity. After being turned down by numerous fraternities because of their nerd status, they are finally, and reluctantly, accepted on probationary status by the Black fraternity Lambda Lambda Lambda (the Tri-Lambs), led by U.N. Jefferson.

Learning that the nerds are planning a party to impress Jefferson, Stan has Betty and her Pi Delta Pi sorority sisters trick them into thinking they will attend, only to abandon them. Desperate, Judy invites her own Omega Mu sorority—made up of nerdy women—to attend instead. The party is initially dull, as most attendees are shy, until Booger brings cannabis, which leads to dancing, fun, and hookups. The Alpha Betas and Pi Delta Pi then sabotage the party by releasing pigs into the house. Although disheartened, the nerds retaliate by installing surveillance cameras to spy on the naked Pi Delta Pis and by pouring liquid heat into the Alpha Betas' jockstraps. Impressed that the nerds have stood up for themselves, Jefferson grants them full membership.

However, Alpha Beta's harassment continues, and Stan blocks any attempt by the Greek Council to sanction them. The nerds conclude that the only way to gain justice is to replace Stan as Council president by winning the Homecoming carnival. Partnering with the Omega Mus, they use ingenuity and technical skills to compensate for their lack of athletic ability in competitions against the Alpha Betas and Pi Delta Pis. At the charity fundraiser, the nerds outsell the Alpha Betas by selling pies containing nude photos of Betty and other Pi Delta Pis. Lewis, having fallen in love with Betty, steals Stan's mask and costume and seduces her by pretending to be Stan. When the truth emerges, Betty—impressed by Lewis's physical attentiveness—has a change of heart and falls for him. The nerds then dominate the musical competition with a technology-themed electronic performance, securing overall victory, after which Lewis nominates Gilbert as the new Greek Council president.

Enraged at losing to the nerds, Coach Harris berates the Alpha Betas, and Stan leads them in vandalizing the Tri-Lamb house. The nerds are left despondent until Gilbert interrupts the Homecoming pep rally to protest their treatment. The Alpha Betas attempt to stop him, but Jefferson arrives with a large group of national Tri-Lamb members, intimidating them and allowing Gilbert to deliver a speech on embracing differences and standing up to prejudice. Lewis, the other Tri-Lambs, alumni, Judy, and Betty join in supporting him, publicly shaming the Alpha Betas. An emboldened Dean Ulich then orders that the Tri-Lambs move into the Alpha Beta house, while the Alpha Betas must live in the gym until they repair the damage to the Tri-Lamb house.

== Cast ==
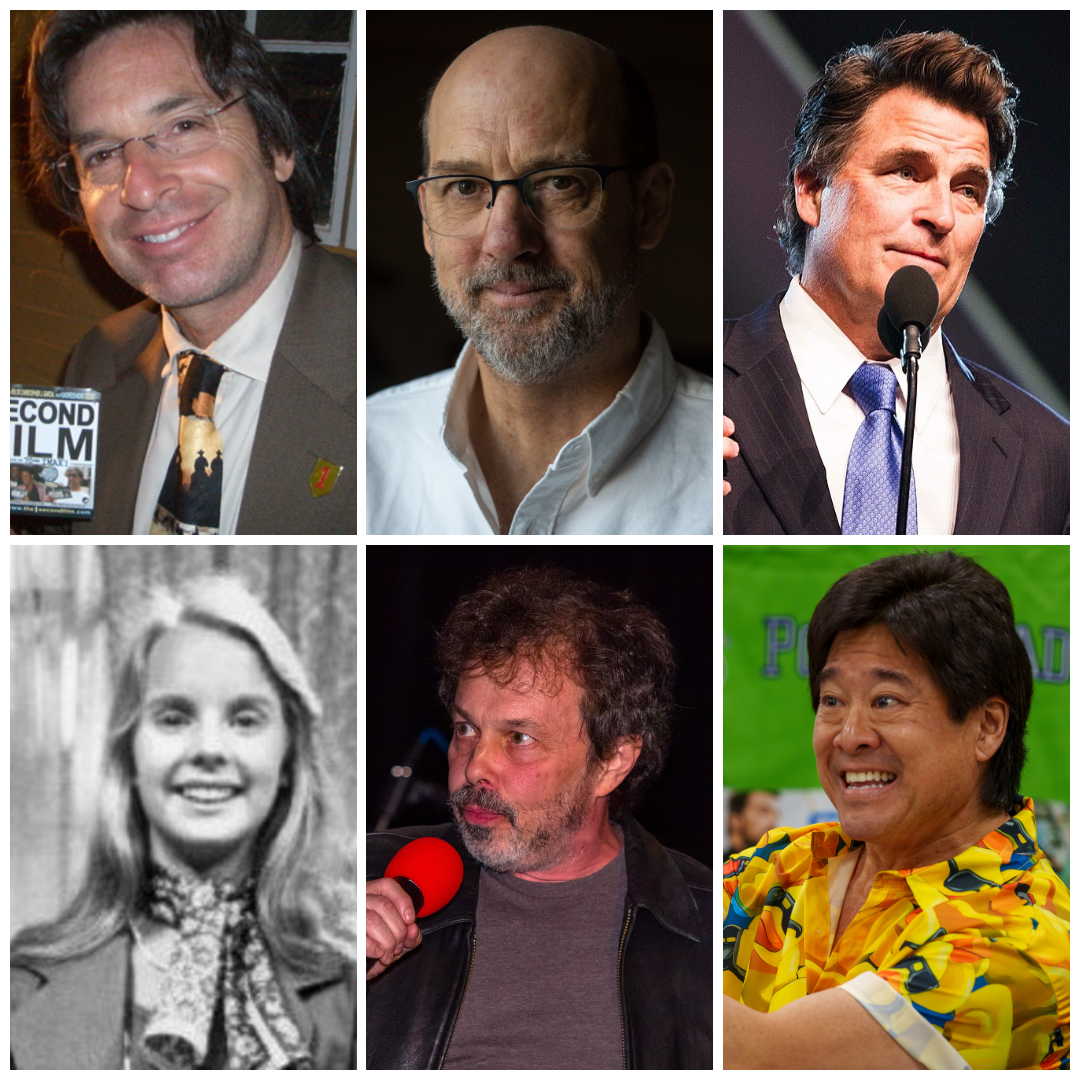
(Left to right) Robert Carradine (pictured in 2004), Anthony Edwards (2018), Ted McGinley (2016), Julia Montgomery (1977), Curtis Armstrong (2014), and Brian Tochi (2025)

- Robert Carradine as Lewis Skolnick
- Anthony Edwards as Gilbert Lowe
- Timothy Busfield as Arnold Poindexter
- Andrew Cassese as Harold Wormser
- Curtis Armstrong as Dudley "Booger" Dawson
- Larry B. Scott as Lamar Latrelle
- Brian Tochi as Toshiro Takashi
- Julia Montgomery as Betty Childs
- Michelle Meyrink as Judy
- Ted McGinley as Stanley Harvey "Stan" Gable
- Matt Salinger as Danny Burke
- Donald Gibb as Frederick Aloysius "Ogre" Palowaski
- James Cromwell as Mr. Skolnick
- David Wohl as Dean Ulich
- John Goodman as Coach Harris
- Bernie Casey as U.N. Jefferson
- Alice Hirson as Mrs. Lowe
- Lisa Welch as Suzy

== Development ==
The movie was inspired by a Los Angeles magazine article, titled "Revenge of the Nerds", that describes computer programmers gaining respect in Silicon Valley.

Director Jeff Kanew saw Ted McGinley on the cover of a "Men of USC" calendar and decided he was perfect for the role of the head of the Alpha Beta fraternity. Kanew cast Matt Salinger as another Alpha Beta brother because he loved his father J. D. Salinger's book The Catcher in the Rye so much.

A scene of a Tri-Lambda convention in Las Vegas was deleted because a 20th Century Fox executive thought it was making fun of him.

== Production ==
The University of Arizona in Tucson, Arizona, was chosen to film many of the exterior scenes. Bill J. Varney, the university's assistant vice president for administrative services, approved filming, particularly after 20th Century Fox agreed to make a large donation to the university. Two weeks later, the university's administrators revoked permission to film on campus. Dudley B. Woodard, university vice president for student affairs, said the movie would not "portray campus life in a representative way". Allan Beigel, vice president of university relations, said there was nothing that would make them change their minds.

After some negotiations, the university allowed filming on campus as long as the producers tried to schedule film shooting so as to not affect campus activities, not film anything "with a questionable nature with regards to taste", and accept advice from fraternities. Production initiated (on-campus) on January 28, 1984 (with principle photography wrapped on March 10th).

The nerds' original residence, from which they were ousted by the Alpha Betas, was actually Cochise Hall. Their subsequent residence was University of Arizona's Bear Down Gymnasium. The original Alpha Beta fraternity house that is burned down was filmed at the Alpha Gamma Rho fraternity house (on University Boulevard).

Casting for extras, specifically for mean jocks, sorority sisters, and members of a black fraternity, was held at the University of Arizona's Drama Building and at a Tucson Hilton Inn.

While working as a security guard during filming, an off-duty police officer found a vial with a small amount of cocaine in a dressing room. The police decided not to pursue an investigation because it would be impossible to determine whose it was.

Interior scenes were shot at Old Tucson Studios.

Different sources report the film's budget between $6 million and $8 million, low for a feature film of the time.

According to producers Ted Field and Peter Samuelson, the two had to fight for the ending pep rally scene as others involved in the production wanted a more cathartic ending where the Nerds would get more violent revenge on the Alpha Betas including destroying their house. Field and Samuelson further stated that the nerds' actions were inspired by Mahatma Gandhi's usage of passive resistance.

== Soundtrack ==
Revenge of the Nerds

Soundtrack album by various artists
- Released: September 1984; March 31, 1998, CD
- Genres: College rock, new wave, synthpop
- Label: Scotti Brothers

Professional ratings
Review scores
Source	Rating
AllMusic	4/5 stars

No.	Title	Artist	Length
1.	"Manhattan"	Andrea & Hot Mink	3:45
2.	"Don't Talk"	Ya Ya	4:02
3.	"One Foot in Front of the Other"	Bone Symphony	3:10
4.	"Breakdown"	The Rubinoos	3:34
5.	"Revenge of the Nerds"	The Rubinoos	3:19
6.	"They're So Incredible"	Revenge	3:54
7.	"Are You Ready?"	Ya Ya	4:02
8.	"Are You Ready for the Sex Girls"	Gleaming Spires	4:10
9.	"Right Time for Love"	Pat Robinson and Jill Michaels	4:00
10.	"All Night Party"	Gleaming Spires	2:31

Ollie E. Brown, of Ollie & Jerry fame, wrote and performed the song "They're So Incredible" for the film, under the name Revenge. In the film, the song is performed by the Tri-Lambs at the final event of the Greek Games and contains different lyrics.

Three songs appear in the film but not on the soundtrack: "Burning Down the House" by Talking Heads, "Thriller" by Michael Jackson, and "We Are the Champions" by Queen.

== Reception ==
=== Critical response ===
Revenge of the Nerds was panned by many reviewers at release. Lawrence Van Gelder for The New York Times wrote, "It is the absence of genuine comedy that exposes glaringly the film's fundamental attitude of condescension and scorn toward blacks and women, and a tendency toward stereotyping that clashes violently with its superficial message of tolerance, compassion and fair play." The Hollywood Reporter said "Revenge of the Nerds is primarily the story of outcasts getting their just rewards, and that is always a satisfying movie ingredient. Nonetheless, this scattergun, often scatological film is filled with extensive racial stereotypes, which may offend some moviegoers." The Atlanta Constitution said that Lewis's pursuit of a cheerleader "goes beyond being pathetic and becomes masochistic". Newsday called it "another predictable and witless teenage sex comedy".

Kevin Thomas of The Los Angeles Times thoroughly enjoyed the movie, calling it "a delicious, gratifying underdog fantasy and a raunchy, uproarious satire set in the often cruel and inherently discriminating world of college fraternities and sororities".

=== Box office ===
Revenge of the Nerds was released in theaters on July 20, 1984, although some theaters showed the movie a few days early as a sneak preview.

The film grossed $40.9 million domestically.

== Home media ==
The film was released on DVD on March 6, 2007, and on Blu-ray on May 6, 2014, by 20th Century Fox Home Entertainment.

== Legacy ==
=== Lasting reception ===
The film holds a 71% critics' approval rating film review aggregator website Rotten Tomatoes, based on 43 critics' reviews. Their consensus reads: "Undeniably lowbrow but surprisingly sly, Revenge of the Nerds has enough big laughs to qualify as a minor classic in the slobs-vs.-snobs subgenre".

On Metacritic, it has a score of 44 out of 100, based on reviews from six critics, indicating "mixed or average reviews".

It is No. 91 on Bravo's "100 Funniest Movies".

=== Fraternity ===
Due to the influence of the film, a genuine Lambda Lambda Lambda fraternity was founded at the University of Connecticut in 2006, and several chapters have launched. The "Tri-Lambs" (not an all-black fraternity as portrayed in the film, but open to all races and orientations) has six chapters in Connecticut, Maryland, New York, and Washington state.

=== Depiction of rape ===
About three decades after the film's release, some commentators have looked at the film and considered some of the scenes, particularly when Lewis pretends to be Stan and has a sexual encounter with Betty, to be rape by deception and a misogynistic remnant of a male-dominated culture of that time. William Bradley of The Mary Sue stated that after viewing the film again as an adult he "was immediately struck by the way the film plays sexual exploitation and assault for laughs". Amy Benfer of Salon wrote that the Revenge of the Nerds scene, and a similar scene in John Hughes's Sixteen Candles, were evidence that at the time of these films' productions, "people were stupid about date rape".

In an interview with GQ in 2019, director Jeff Kanew and writer Steve Zacharias expressed their regret regarding the rape by deception scene, with Kanew saying, "In a way, it's not excusable. If it were my daughter, I probably wouldn't like it."

== Sequels and adaptations ==
Three less successful sequels followed; the last two are television films.

- Revenge of the Nerds II: Nerds in Paradise (1987)
- Revenge of the Nerds III: The Next Generation (1992)
- Revenge of the Nerds IV: Nerds in Love (1994)

A remake of the original Revenge of the Nerds was slated for release in 2007, the first project for the newly created Fox Atomic, but was canceled in November 2006 after two weeks of filming. The cast included Adam Brody, Dan Byrd, Katie Cassidy, Kristin Cavallari, Jenna Dewan, Chris Marquette, Ryan Pinkston, Efren Ramirez, and Nick Zano. The film was to be directed by Kyle Newman, executive produced by McG, and written by Gabe Sachs and Jeff Judah, Adam Jay Epstein and Andrew Jacobson, and Adam F. Goldberg.

Filming took place in Atlanta, Georgia, at Agnes Scott College, the Georgia State Capitol, and Inman Park. Filming was originally scheduled to take place at Emory University, but university officials changed their minds after reading the script. The film was shelved after producers found the movie difficult to shoot on the smaller Agnes Scott campus and studio head Peter Rice was disappointed with the dailies. 20th Century Fox personnel have stated that it is highly unlikely that a remake will be picked up in the future.

Seth MacFarlane announced his intentions to reboot the series under his Fuzzy Door Productions for 20th Century Studios in December 2020 with Kenny and Keith Lucas to write and star in the film.

A pilot for a Revenge of the Nerds television series directed by Peter Baldwin was produced in 1991, but was never aired and was not picked up for a series. The aborted TV pilot was later included as a bonus in the DVD and Blu-ray release of the film.

In the mid-2000s, Armstrong and Carradine had devised an idea for a reality television show based on nerds competing against each other in challenges, inspired by Revenge of the Nerds. However, the idea was rejected at the time, due to the competing Beauty and the Geek show. Six years later, Armstrong and Carradine shopped the idea around and were able to get the show greenlit on TBS in 2012. King of the Nerds ran for three seasons from 2013 to 2015, with Armstrong and Carradine hosting.

== See also ==
- Animal House (1978)
