= Curtis Armstrong =

American actor (born 1953)

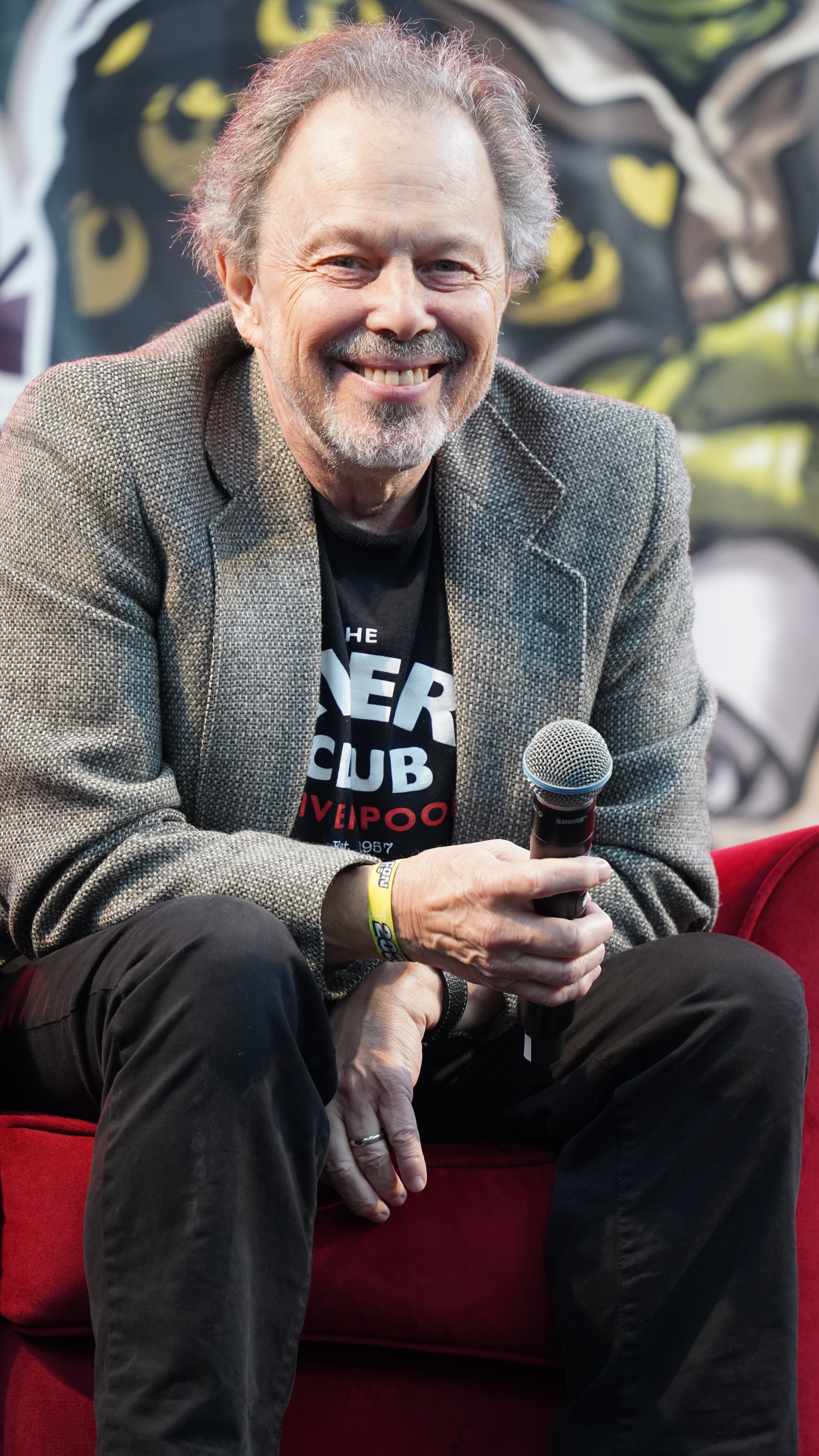
- Armstrong in 2025
- Born: Curtis Armstrong; November 27, 1953 (age 72); Detroit, Michigan, U.S.
- Education: Oakland University
- Occupation: Actor
- Years active: 1977–present
- Spouse: Elaine Aronson (m. 1994)
- Children: 1

Curtis Armstrong (born November 27, 1953) is an American actor. He is best known for playing the roles of Charles in Better Off Dead, Booger in the Revenge of the Nerds films, Herbert Viola on the TV series Moonlighting, Miles Dalby in the film Risky Business, record producer Ahmet Ertegun in the film Ray, and Metatron on the TV series Supernatural.

He is also known for providing his voice for such characters as Schmuley "Snot" Lonstein on the animated TV series American Dad! and Maru in the animated film Planes: Fire & Rescue in addition to portraying the title character on the animated TV series Dan Vs., Mr. Moleguaco in The Emperor's New School, Ezekiel the Cockroach on Doom Patrol, and Robot Default on Robot and Monster.

From 2013 to 2015, he served as the co-host of the TBS reality television competition series King of the Nerds.

== Early life ==
Armstrong was born on November 27, 1953, in Detroit, Michigan. During his childhood, he lived in Switzerland for a few years while his father worked there. His family returned to Michigan, and he graduated from Berkley High School in Berkley, Michigan.

Armstrong attended Western Michigan University and later transferred to the Academy of Dramatic Art at Oakland University in Rochester, Michigan, graduating in 1975.

== Career ==
His first role came in the 1983 film Risky Business. However, he is best known for his role of Booger in Revenge of the Nerds, reprising the role in the sequels Revenge of the Nerds II: Nerds in Paradise, Revenge of the Nerds III: The Next Generation, and Revenge of the Nerds IV: Nerds in Love. Armstrong's typecasting in the role was mocked in The Simpsons episode "E-I-E-I-(Annoyed Grunt)". His other films include Better Off Dead, Big Bully, One Crazy Summer, Bad Medicine, National Lampoon's Van Wilder, Smokin' Aces, DodgeBall: A True Underdog Story, Jingle All the Way, Southland Tales, and Beer for My Horses. He also had a recurring role as Herbert Viola on the television series Moonlighting, and he played the part of Ahmet Ertegun in the biographical film Ray (2004).

Armstrong provided the voices for Mr. Moleguaco and Mr. Bugspit on the Disney Channel original series The Emperor's New School and The Buzz on Maggie. Armstrong was also in Akeelah and the Bee. He played "Farley", a fictional composite character based on members of Elvis Presley's real entourage in the 1997 cult-comedy film Elvis Meets Nixon. He also had a bit part as "Russ" on the short-lived TV show Reaper.

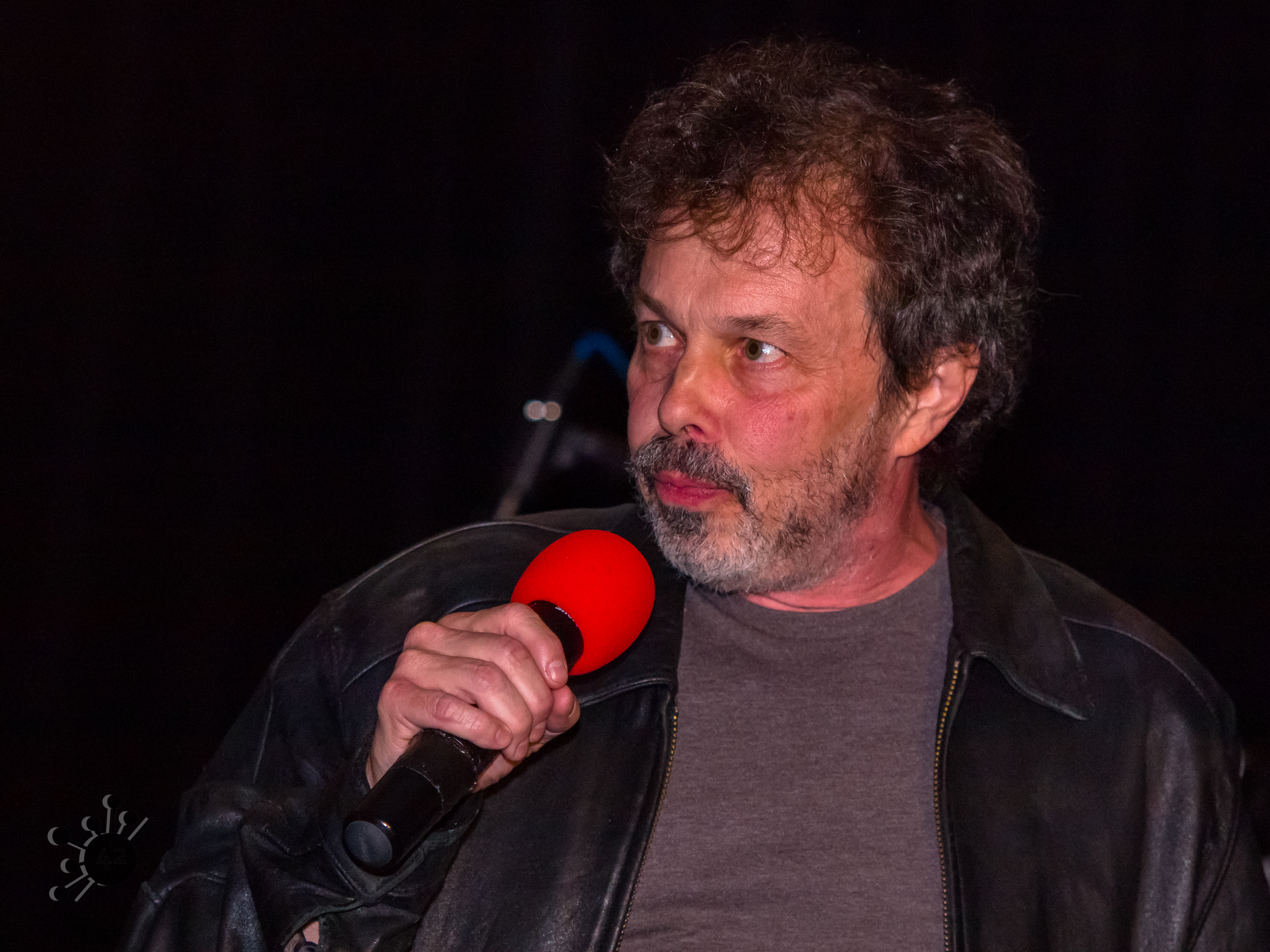
Armstrong in 2014

Armstrong was cast in the 2000 film Shanghai Noon as Wild West hawker Bulldog Drummond, but all three scenes in which his character appears were cut from the film during the editing phase. He voices "Snot" on the animated sitcom American Dad!, parodying his role from Revenge of the Nerds. He also had a role as Double Wide in the cartoon series Stroker and Hoop on Adult Swim. He appeared in the 2006 production of Akeelah and the Bee as Mr. Welch. He was on VH1's 100 Greatest Teen Stars despite being thirty when he played his first role. He played "Mecklen" in the 2007 film, Smokin' Aces.

In the feature film Ray, for preparation for his role as music executive Ahmet Ertegun, he had the top part of his head shaved to simulate male pattern baldness. In 1999, he played a seedy reporter in The Baby Menace, the first episode of season five of 3rd Rock From The Sun. He guest starred in episode 10 — "Much Too Much" — and had a much smaller part in episode 11 — "Owner of a Lonely Heart" — in season two of Grey's Anatomy. Armstrong played a deejay named Jerry Thunder on That '70s Show, episode 315, "Radio Daze." In 2006 Armstrong was in an episode of Boston Legal. In 2008, he guest starred on the iCarly episode "iStakeout" as a convenience store clerk who was suspected of making unauthorized copies of films. In 2009 he appeared in Ratko: The Dictator's Son, and Locker 13. He played fictional astronaut Chaz Dalton on an episode of the TV series My Name is Earl. From 2008 to 2013 he portrayed Dr Parker/Dr Dawson on The Game.

2009 found Armstrong playing a paranoid character in a mental institution on the House season six premiere, "Broken". Also in 2009 Armstrong appeared in American Pie Presents: The Book of Love, as a teacher obsessed with the principal of the school, and he also appeared as a bumbling bandit in the film Gold Retrievers.

In 2010, Armstrong made a guest appearance on the television show Glory Daze and began voicing the main character on the animated series Dan Vs. He also voices Robot in Robot and Monster. He also appeared on Spike TV's Blue Mountain State (S01E11). In 2011, he appeared on an episode of Curb Your Enthusiasm, and has a recurring role as attorney Peter Goldman on season seven of The Closer. He reprised this role in season four of Major Crimes.

On October 27, 2011, he appeared as himself on the television show Rules of Engagement.

In May 2013, Armstrong had a recurring role as Principal Foster in several episodes of New Girl.

He played the angel Metatron in several episodes in the 9th, 10th and 11th seasons of Supernatural.

Armstrong and former Revenge of the Nerds co-star Robert Carradine host the TBS reality TV competition series King of the Nerds. The series, which pits contestants with expertise in a variety of geek interests to see who will be crowned with the eponymous title, premiered in January 2013.

In addition to his acting career, Armstrong's affinity for the music of Harry Nilsson has prompted him to become an enthusiast of Nilsson's work. He has written liner notes for CD reissues of Nilsson albums and has been instrumental in archival and bonus track preparation for these reissues. Additionally, Armstrong is a fan of Washington Irving, Laurel and Hardy, and Sir Arthur Conan Doyle's Sherlock Holmes stories. In 2006, he was inducted into the Baker Street Irregulars as "An Actor and a Rare One."

== Personal life ==
Armstrong had a Catholic upbringing; he later converted to Judaism when he married Elaine Aronson. His daughter Lily Armstrong was born in 1995. Armstrong announced via social media that his father, Robert Armstrong, had died on May 25, 2020.

== Filmography ==
=== Film ===
Year	Film	Role	Note
1983	Risky Business	Miles Dalby	
1984	Revenge of the Nerds	Dudley "Booger" Dawson	
1985	Better Off Dead	Charles De Mar	
1985	Bad Medicine	Dennis Gladstone	
1986	The Clan of the Cave Bear	Goov	
1986	One Crazy Summer	Ack Ack Raymond	
1987	Revenge of the Nerds II: Nerds in Paradise	Dudley "Booger" Dawson	
1989	How I Got into College	Arcadia Bible Academy Recruiter	
1991	Hi Honey - I'm Dead	Arnold Pischkin	
1993	The Adventures of Huck Finn	Country Jake	
1996	Big Bully	Clark	
1996	Jingle All the Way	Chain Smoking Booster	
2002	Van Wilder	Campus Cop	
2003	Quigley	Dexter Persley	
2003	My Dinner with Jimi	Herb Cohen	
2004	DodgeBall: A True Underdog Story	Mr. Ralph	
2004	The Seat Filler	LaJean	
2004	Vendetta: No Conscience, No Mercy	Brodrick Dooley	
2004	Ray	Ahmet Ertegun	
2005	Man of the House	Morgan Ball	
2006	National Lampoon's Pucked	Janitor	
2006	Akeelah and the Bee	Mr. Welch	
2006	Southland Tales	Dr. Soberin Exx	
2006	Smokin' Aces	Mecklen	
2007	Route 30	Ned	
2008	Beer for My Horses	D.A.	
2009	Legally Blondes	Mr. Gary Golden	
2009	American Pie Presents: The Book of Love	Mr. O'Donnell	
2011	Flypaper	Mitchell Wolf	
2011	Bucky Larson: Born to Be a Star	Clint	
2011	Beethoven's Christmas Adventure	Kenny	
2012	Sparkle	Larry	
2014	Planes: Fire & Rescue	Maru	Voice

=== Television ===
Year	Series	Role	Notes
1986–1989	Moonlighting	Herbert Quentin Viola	Main role
1991	Hi Honey – I'm Dead	Arnold Pischkin	Television film
1992	Revenge of the Nerds III: The Next Generation	Dudley "Booger" Dawson	Television film
1993–1997	The Terrible Thunderlizards	Scooter	Voice, main role
1994	Revenge of the Nerds IV: Nerds in Love	Dudley "Booger" Dawson	Television film
1995	M.A.N.T.I.S	B.B. Rantzer	Episode: "Fast Forward"
1995	Lois & Clark: The New Adventures of Superman	Albie Swenson	Episode: "Resurrection"
1997	The Hunger	Bart Brookman	Episode: "Room 117"
1998	Safety Patrol	Bert Miller / Tim Bartlett	Television film
1998	Brimstone	Jimmy G.	Episode: "Repentance"
1998	The Secret Diary of Desmond Pfeiffer	Confederate soldier	Episode: "Up, Up and Away"
1998	Love Boat: The Next Wave	Mitch Beeber	Episode: "Remember?"
1999	Felicity	Danny	3 episodes
1999	3rd Rock from the Sun	Ken Fretts	Episode: "The Baby Menace"
2000	The Amanda Show	Video Store Clerk	"Moody's Point Segment"
2000	Batman Beyond	Warren	Voice, episode: "Payback"
2001	That '70s Show	Jerry Thunder	Episode: "Radio Daze"
2001–2002	The Chronicle	Sal the Pig-Boy	14 episodes
2001–2003	Ed	Mr. Cheswick	3 episodes
2002	Project Viper	Keach	Television film
2003	Return to the Batcave: The Misadventures of Adam and Burt	Jerry the Butler	Television film
2004	Joan of Arcadia	Security Guard / God	Episode: "State of Grace"
2004	One on One	Matt	4 episodes
2004	Johnny Bravo	Himself	Voice, episode: "Some Walk by Night"
2004–2005	Stroker & Hoop	Double-Wide, Deputy, Grobbit 2, Pool Cleaner, Old Woman, Zombie Ken, Bear Collector, Pepe Peepee	Voice, recurring role
2005–present	American Dad!	Snot Lonstein / Eli Weisel	Voice, recurring role
2005–2006	The Buzz on Maggie	Mr. Bugspit	Voice, recurring role
2005	Grey's Anatomy	Robert Martin	2 episodes
2006–2008	The Emperor's New School	Mr. Moleguaco	Voice, recurring role
2007	Shredderman Rules	Mayor Izzo	Television film
2007	Wizards of Waverly Place	Zit	Episode: "Pop Me And We Both Go Down"
2007	Ghost Whisperer	Harold	Episode: "The Walk-In"
2007	iCarly	Store Clerk	Episode: "iStakeout"
2007	Psych	Jervis	Episode: "The Old and the Restless"
2007–2011	The Game	Dr. Parker/Dr. Dawson	Recurring role
2008	My Name Is Earl	Chaz Dalton	Episode: "Chaz Dalton Space Academy"
2008	House	Richter	Episode: "Broken"
2008	Blue Mountain State	Ronnie Hayes	Episode: "Ransom"
2008	CSI: Crime Scene Investigation	Clint Pudder	Episode: "The Panty Sniffer"
2008	Curb Your Enthusiasm	Computer Guy	Episode: "The Safe House"
2008	Rules of Engagement	Himself	Episode: "Bros Before Nodes"
2008	That's Our Joe	Snot	Episode: "You Can't Do the 'Lunchables All Star Show', Joe"
2008	The Dog Who Saved Halloween	Max	Television film
2009–2010	The Closer	Peter Goldman	Recurring role
2009–2012	Horrible Histories	Robot	Voice, Series 1-4 />
2011–2013	Dan Vs.	Dan	Voice, main role
2011	Scandal	Attorney Cole	Episode: "Hell Hath No Fury"
2010–2012	Robot and Monster	Robot, Marf	Voice, main role
2012	Bones	Oscar Schultz	Episode: "The Blood from the Stones"
2012	Hot in Cleveland	Clark	Episode: "Lost Loves and Tangled Web"
2012	New Girl	Principal Foster	Recurring role
2013–2015	King of the Nerds	Himself, in reference to Dudley "Booger" Dawson	Main role
2013–2016	Supernatural	Metatron	Recurring role
2014	TripTank	Candy Van Man	Voice, episode: "Candy Van Finger Bang"
2015	Workaholics	Richard Ottmar	Episode "Trivia Pursuits"
2015	Highston	Uncle Billy	Amazon Originals Pilot episode
2016	Major Crimes	Peter Goldman	Episode: "Hindsight"
2016	Frequency	Karl	Episode: "Deviation"
2017	Penn Zero: Part-Time Hero	Super Amazing Bouncy Ball	Voice, 2 episodes
2017	MacGyver	The Pawn	Episode: "Packing Peanuts + Fire"
2018	Champaign ILL	Burt	Recurring role
2019	Malibu Rescue	Mr. Rathbone	Television film
2019	Tangled: The Series	Constable Lumph	Voice, episode: "The Eye of Pincosta"
2019	Doom Patrol	Ezekiel the Cockroach	Voice, 3 episodes
2019	Happy!	Dayglo Doug	3 episodes
2019–present	The Loud House	Mr. Gurdle	Voice, 3 episodes
2020	Malibu Rescue: The Next Wave	Mr. Rathbone	Television film
2020	It's Pony	Basil	Voice, episode: "The Giving Chair"
2021–2024	Monsters at Work	Mr. Crummyham	Voice, recurring role

=== Video games ===
Year	Game	Role	Note
2000	Vampire: The Masquerade - Redemption	Pink	
2010	Mafia II	Civilians	

==== Audio roles ====
List of voice performances in audio plays
Year	Title	Role	Notes
2022	Moriarty: The Devil's Game	Inspector Gregson	Audible Original
2023	Moriarty: The Silent Order	Boss Duffy	Audible Original

=== Music videos ===
Year	Music Video	Artist	Note	Ref
2002	"Move It Like This"	Baha Men	Directed by Bryan Barber	
2018	"Supernatural Parody 2"	The Hillywood Show		
