= David Wohl (actor) =

American actor

- Born: September 22, 1953 (age 72); Brooklyn, New York, U.S.
- Occupation: Actor
- Years active: 1981–present

David Wohl (born September 22, 1953) is an American theater, television and film actor. He is a longtime character actor.

== Selected filmography ==
- Terms of Endearment (1983) as Phil
- Revenge of the Nerds (1984) as Dean Ulich
- Gotcha! (1985) as Professor
- Beer (1985) as Stanley Dickler
- Turk 182 (1985) as TV producer
- D.A.R.Y.L. (1985) as Mr. Nesbit
- Brewster's Millions (1985) as Eugene Provost
- Badge of the Assassin (1985) as Ken Klein
- Armed and Dangerous (1986) as Prosecutor
- Like Father Like Son (1987) as Dr. Roger Hartwood
- The Couch Trip (1988) as Dr. Smet
- Troop Beverly Hills (1989) as Dr. Honigman
- The War of the Roses (1989) as Dr. Gordon
- Presumed Innocent (1990) as Morrie Dickerman
- Hot Shots! Part Deux (1993) as Gerou
- She Led Two Lives (1994) as Harvey Parnell
- Rear Window (1998) as Dr. Schneider
- Saving Private Ryan (1998) as Captain T.E. Sanders, Captain at the War Department
- The Wackness (2008) as Mr. Shapiro

== Television ==
- Family Ties (1986), episode 81 "The Disciple", as Ralph Boswell
- Brooklyn Bridge (1991-1993) as Sid Elgart
- Hey Arnold! (1996–2004) as Principal Wartz and Jerry Berman
- Madam Secretary as Israeli Ambassador Dory

== Broadway ==
- The Man Who Had All the Luck (2002) as Augie Belfast
- Dinner at Eight (2002–2003) as Mr. Fitch
- Fiddler on the Roof (2004–2006) as Lazar Wolf

== Regional theatre ==
- The Buddy System, Circle in the Square Downtown, New York City, 1981 as Arthur "Gruely" Gruelbacher
- The Man Who Came to Dinner, Cincinnati Playhouse, Cincinnati, OH, 1981
- Northern Lights, Cricket Theatre, Minneapolis, MN, 1981
- Awake and Sing!, Jewish Repertory Theatre, New York City, 1981
- Portrait of Jenny, New Federal Theatre, Harry DeJur Playhouse, New York City, 1982 as Gus
- Luna Park, in Delmore, Jewish Repertory Theatre, 1982 as Harry
- Shenandoah in Delmore, Jewish Repertory Theatre, 1982 as Walter
- Basement Tapes, Top of the Gate, New York City, 1983 as G. Gordon Liddy
- Isn't It Romantic?, Lucille Lortel Theatre, New York City, 1985 as Marty Sterling
- Ghetto, Center Theatre Group, Mark Taper Forum, Los Angeles, 1986
- Down the Garden Paths, George Street Playhouse, New Brunswick, NJ, 1999 as Arthur
