= Robert Engelman =

Robert Engelman is an American author and former journalist who writes about the environment and population and serves as Senior Fellow at the Worldwatch Institute. He was President of the institute from 2011 until 2014. His book More: Population, Nature, and What Women Want was published in 2008.

== Early life and education ==
Engelman received his Bachelor of Arts degree from the University of Chicago and his masters of science from the Columbia University Graduate School of Journalism, which in 1976 awarded him a Pulitzer Traveling Fellowship.

== Journalism career ==
Engelman began his career as a newspaper reporter, working for the Associated Press out of Mexico City in 1977. He subsequently worked for the Kansas City Times in Kansas City and Washington, D.C., and then for the (Denver) Rocky Mountain News as its Washington correspondent. He later joined the national reporting staff of Scripps Howard News Service, eventually serving as its science, health and environment correspondent.

== Population advocacy career ==
In 1992 Engelman left journalism and founded a research program on population and the environment at the Population Crisis Committee, a Washington-based research and advocacy non-profit that subsequently changed its name to Population Action International (PAI). He later became vice president for research at PAI. In 1997, he was among the founders of the Center for a New American Dream and served until 2007 as chair of its board of directors. While at PAI Engelman and colleagues published reports on the linkages of population dynamics and environmental change, one of them published in the journal Nature in 2000. In 2002 and 2003, Engelman served on the faculty of Yale University as a visiting lecturer on population and the environment.

In 2007, Engelman joined the staff of the Worldwatch Institute as vice president for programs, where he has continued his research and writing on population and the environment. He is one of several authors and one of three project directors of the institute's signature publication The State of the World 2009: Into a Warming World and co-directs Worldwatch's fundraising from foundations and governments. He was President of the institute from 2011 to 2013 and is now a senior fellow.

== Books ==
- More: Population, Nature, and What Women Want 2010, Island Press, ISBN 1597268224
- Population, Climate Change, and Women's Lives, 2010, Kindle Edition

== Bibliography ==
- "Sealing the Deal to Save the Climate", State of the World 2009: Into a Warming World, Norton, 2009, ISBN 978-0-393-33418-0
- More: Population, Nature, and What Women Want, Island Press, 2008, ISBN 978-1-59726-019-0

=== Articles ===
- Population and Sustainability: Can We Avoid Limiting the Number of People? June 2009, Scientific American
- Earth Hour? Why Not "Earth Until-We-Figure-This-Out?" March 2009, Huffington Post
