= Larry B. Scott =

American actor

- Born: August 17, 1961 (age 65); New York City, U.S.
- Occupation: Actor
- Years active: 1977–2012; 2018–present

Larry B. Scott (born August 17, 1961) is an American actor whose film debut was in the 1978 movie A Hero Ain't Nothin' but a Sandwich.

== Early life ==
Scott was born in New York City and grew up in St. Albans, Queens, the sixth of nine children of Andrew, a civil servant, and Valerie, a social worker. In high school, Scott became an active member of the Pentecostal church.

== Career ==
Scott played Gerald LeFlore in the 1978 movie One in a Million: The Ron LeFlore Story. He is best known for playing Lamar Latrelle, the openly gay fraternity member in the Revenge of the Nerds series of comedy films from 1984 to 1994.

In the 1986 film SpaceCamp he played opposite Joaquin Phoenix as the character Rudy Tyler. In Fear of a Black Hat, he played Tasty-Taste, a pastiche of rappers Flavor Flav and Eazy-E. Scott also makes an appearance in The Karate Kid and is one of the first competitors to lose to Daniel LaRusso in the film's finale. He also appeared in the movie Iron Eagle. He then co-starred in Extreme Prejudice directed by Walter Hill. He played a role in the S.E. Hinton adaptation That Was Then... This Is Now, alongside Emilio Estevez.

Scott has also made appearances in several television series, including Barney Miller, The Jeffersons, Seinfeld, St. Elsewhere, Magnum P.I. and Martin along with the television movie Roll of Thunder, Hear My Cry, and he starred as tech genius F.X. Spinner on the sci-fi action adventure series Super Force for two seasons. He was also the voice of the Paladin in the game Diablo II and reprised his role in Diablo IV.
