= Carradine =

Carradine is a surname. Notable people with the surname include:

== People ==
- The Carradine acting family, including:
  - John Carradine, American actor
  - David Carradine, American actor, son of John Carradine
  - Robert Carradine (1954–2026), American actor, son of John Carradine
    - Ever Carradine, American actress, daughter of Robert Carradine
  - Keith Carradine, American actor and songwriter, son of John Carradine
    - Sorel Carradine, American actress, daughter of Keith Carradine
    - Sandra Will Carradine, American actress, first wife of Keith Carradine
- Beverly Carradine (1848–1931), American Methodist minister and evangelist; grandfather of actor John Carradine
- Cat Iron (c. 1896 – c. 1958), real name William Carradine, African-American blues singer and guitarist
- Tank Carradine (born 1990), American football player

== Fictional characters ==
- Dennis Carradine, the burglar who killed Spider-Man's Uncle Ben
- Jessica Carradine, a daughter of Dennis Carradine
