= List of awards and nominations received by Karen Black =

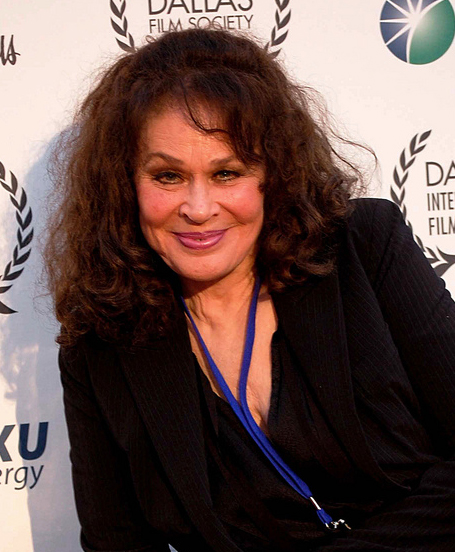
Black in 2010

Over the course of her 50-year-long film career, American actress Karen Black received numerous critical accolades for her performances in films and theater. In 1965, she received a nomination for Best Actress by the New York Drama Critics' Circle for her Broadway performance in The Playroom. She later garnered critical acclaim for her performance in the film Five Easy Pieces (1970), for which she was nominated for an Academy Award for Best Supporting Actress, and for which she won a Golden Globe Award. Black won her second Golden Globe for Best Supporting Actress for her portrayal of Myrtle Wilson in The Great Gatsby (1974). The following year, she earned her third Golden Globe nomination, this time in the category of Best Actress, for her role in The Day of the Locust (1975). Black was also nominated for a Grammy Award for her songwriting and singing on the soundtrack for Nashville (1975), in which she starred as a glamorous country singer.

== Academy Awards ==
The Academy Awards are a set of awards given by the Academy of Motion Picture Arts and Sciences annually for excellence of cinematic achievements.

Year	Nominated work	Category	Result	Ref.
1970	Five Easy Pieces	Best Supporting Actress	Nominated	

== Chicago Alt.film Fest ==
The Chicago Alt.film Fest is a film festival held in Chicago which screens and celebrates achievements in independent and experimental cinema.

Year	Nominated work	Category	Result	Ref.
1999	Fallen Arches	Best Acting	Won	

== Fangoria Chainsaw Awards ==
The Fangoria Chainsaw Awards are an award ceremony focused on horrors and thriller films, inaugurated in 1992.

Year	Nominated work	Category	Result	Ref.
2003	House of 1000 Corpses	Best Supporting Actress	Won	

== Golden Globe Awards ==
The Golden Globe Award is bestowed by the members of the Hollywood Foreign Press Association (HFPA) recognizing excellence in film and television, both domestic and foreign.

Year	Nominated work	Category	Result	Ref.
1970	Five Easy Pieces	Best Supporting Actress	Won (Note: Tied with Maureen Stapleton for Airport.)	
1974	The Great Gatsby	Best Supporting Actress	Won	
1975	The Day of the Locust	Best Actress in a Motion Picture – Drama	Nominated	

== Grammy Awards ==
The Grammy Awards are presented annually by The Recording Academy to recognize achievements in the music industry.

Year	Nominated work	Category	Result	Ref.
1975	Nashville: The Original Motion Picture Soundtrack (shared with Keith Carradine, Ronee Blakley, Richard Baskin, Ben Raleigh, Richard Reicheg, and Henry Gibson)	Best Score Soundtrack for Visual Media	Nominated	

== Hermosa Beach Film Festival Award ==
The Hermosa Beach Film Festival Award is held annually in Hermosa Beach, Florida.

Year	Nominated work	Category	Result	Ref.
1998	Dogtown and Sugar: The Fall of the West	Best Actress	Won	

== National Board of Review ==
The National Board of Review was founded in 1909 in New York City to award "film, domestic and foreign, as both art and entertainment".

Year	Nominated work	Category	Result	Ref.
1970	Five Easy Pieces	Best Supporting Actress	Won	

== New York Drama Critics' Circle ==
The New York Drama Critics' Circle awards is made up of 19 drama critics from daily newspapers, magazines and wire services based in the New York City metropolitan area.

Year	Nominated work	Category	Result	Ref.
1965	The Playroom	Best Actress	Nominated	

== New York Film Critics Circle ==
Founded in 1935, the New York Film Critics Circle (NYFCC) is an American film critics' organization founded in 1935, and whose membership includes over 30 film critics from New York-based daily and weekly newspapers, magazines, online publications.

Year	Nominated work	Category	Result	Ref.
1970	Five Easy Pieces	Best Supporting Actress	Won	
1970	Five Easy Pieces	Best Actress	Nominated	

== Sitges Film Festival ==
Founded in 1968, the Sitges Film Festival is an international film festival held annually in Spain, screening and celebrating achievements in fantasy and horror films.

Year	Nominated work	Category	Result	Ref.
1976	Burnt Offerings	Best Actress	Won	
