= October the 31st (The Fall Guy) =

1984 episode of The Fall Guy

"October the 31st" is an episode of the American television series The Fall Guy, starring Lee Majors. This episode first appeared on October 31, 1984. The episode features two guest stars: veteran horror movie actor John Carradine and Elvira, Mistress of the Dark. Carradine's sons Keith, Robert, and David Carradine make a cameo appearance in a scene with their father.

== Synopsis ==
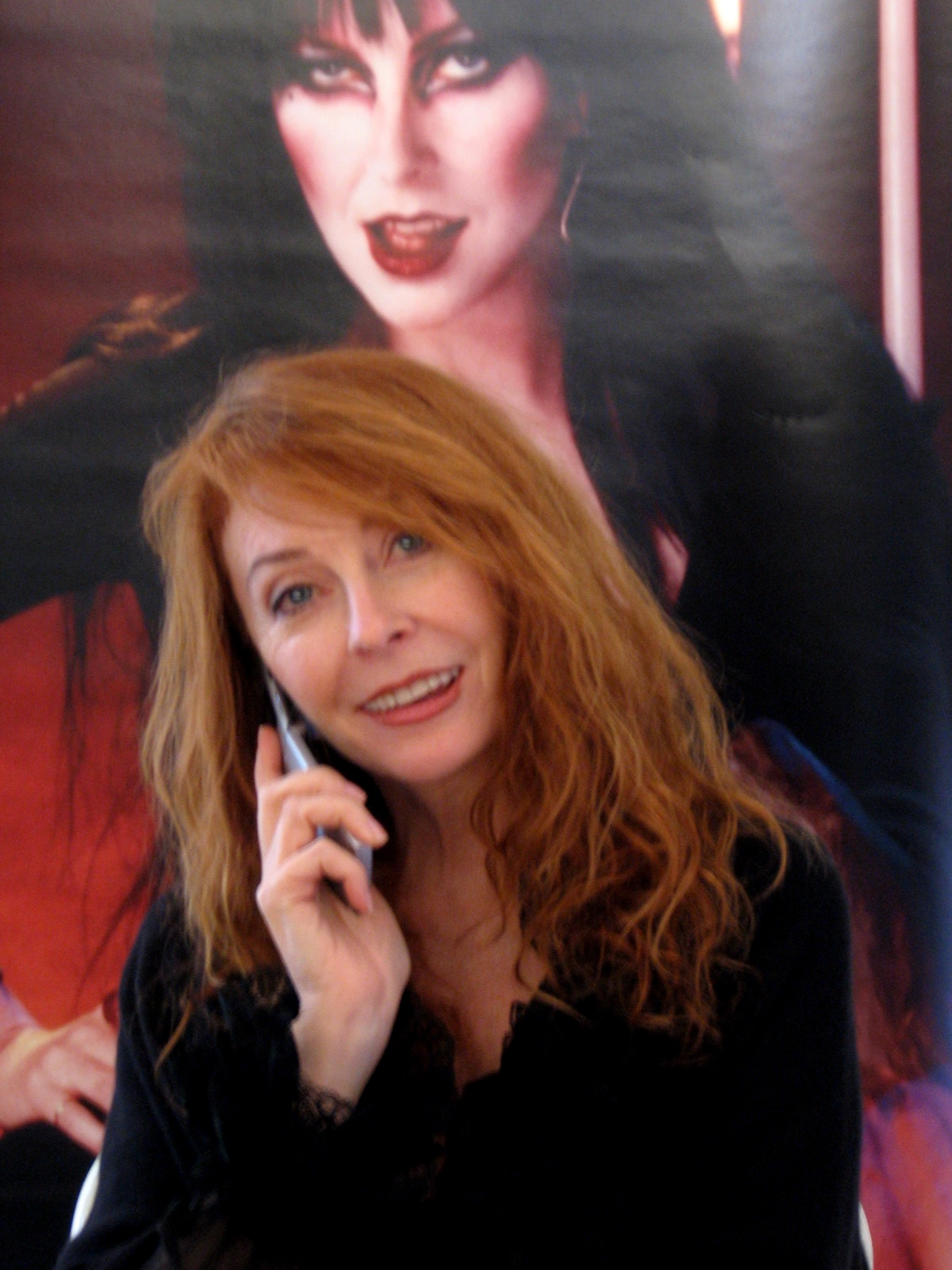
Cassandra Peterson appears before a poster of her as "Elvira"

In this episode, Elvira (Cassandra Peterson) is preparing to guest star in a Halloween television special with stunt man Colt Seavers (Lee Majors). The cast and crew of the special become aware that the producers have arranged to film the project in a mansion that is supposedly haunted. The crew arrive at the mansion and beginning setting up their equipment, when it becomes apparent that the owner of the mansion, Preston Deauville (John Carradine), is outraged that his wife Katherine (Signe Hasso) arranged for the filming to occur there without his knowledge. As Deauville opposes the arrangement, he is so vexed that he fires his staff which include a chef, a gardener, and a caretaker (played by John Carradine's sons Keith, Robert, and David Carradine, respectively). The staff plead with the old man to reconsider. At one point, David's character blurts out "You're insane!" The elder Carradine's character responds, "And with a little diligence, the same can be said of you!"

As the episode progresses, Preston Deauville dies of an apparent heart attack and is buried in the backyard. However, Deauville remains present in the house, menacing the actors and crew who are trying to film their show. It is eventually discovered that Deauville was murdered by his evil twin brother (also played by John Carradine) in a plot with his wife.

== Reaction ==
The episode aired the same night that Elvira's six-hour Halloween special aired on MTV as well as an appearance by her on The Tonight Show. John Carradine also appeared on her special that evening.

The episode was built around the Elvira character. The actress said she was very pleased with The Fall Guy script. "You know, when I was on CHiPs, they toned my character down for network TV. That's why I was so happy with the script for The Fall Guy, where they not only wrote the whole story around me, but they kept my risque humor. I think it came out really cute."

While filming the episode on location at a convent, Elvira was actually "mobbed" by a group of nuns clamoring for her autograph.
