= Beverly Carradine =

American Methodist minister and evangelist

The Reverend Beverly Carradine
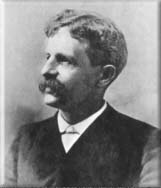
- Beverly Carradine
- Born: Beverly Francis Carradine; April 4, 1848 Yazoo County, Mississippi, U.S.
- Died: April 22, 1931 (aged 83) Western Springs, Illinois, U.S.
- Occupation: Author; Methodist minister Evangelist

Beverly Francis Carradine (April 4, 1848 – April 22, 1931) was an American Methodist minister and a leading evangelist for the holiness movement. He was a productive author, writing primarily on the subject of sanctification. The patriarch of the Carradine family, he was the grandfather of actor John Carradine and great-grandfather of actors David, Keith, and Robert Carradine.

== Early life ==
Beverly Carradine was born on April 4, 1848, on Altamont Plantation in Yazoo County, Mississippi. Carradine was the sixth of nine children, and fourth son of Mary Caroline Hewitt Carradine (born June 5, 1819, in Washington, D.C.; died 1881 in Yazoo City, Mississippi) and Henry Francis Carradine (born June 7, 1808, in Yazoo City, Mississippi; died March 8, 1854), a planter. The Carradine family moved to Yazoo City in 1852.

In 1865, Carradine, aged 16, enlisted in Wood's Regiment in the Confederate Cavalry in Mississippi, and served until the end of the American Civil War. In May 1865, he was mustered out with the 6th Cavalry Regiment Mississippi.

Carradine graduated from the University of Mississippi in 1867. Later he studied pharmacy and worked as a clerk and bookkeeper in a store.

== Career ==
Carradine "prayed through" on July 12, 1874, and then he told his wife, "Laura, I’m not going to go to Hell after all." He was licensed to preach in October 1874 and became a pastor in Mississippi and New Orleans. He was ordained a Methodist elder in 1878.

On June 1, 1889, Carradine received the "blessing of sanctification" in his study in the parsonage at 35 Polyminca Street, New Orleans. His third book, Sanctification, was published the next year. Many of his subsequent books were centered on the concept of sanctification. He published at least 26 books.

He also wrote about his opposition to the Louisiana lottery, making an analogy between it and slavery. The New York Times reported that his early opposition as a prominent New Orleans pastor helped end the lottery in that state.

== Death ==
Carradine died on April 22, 1931, in Western Springs, Illinois, aged 83. He was buried at Cedar Hill Cemetery, Vicksburg, Mississippi.

== Personal life ==
Although a prolific author, Carradine wrote little about himself and his family, not even in his autobiographical Pastoral Sketches.

Carradine was married twice, and had at least nine children. On July 3, 1869, Carradine married Laura Green Reid (born 1851 in Washington, D.C.; died in Vicksburg, Mississippi in 1882), in Yazoo, Mississippi. They had five children: Ernest Carradine (b. ? - died 1880); William Reed Carradine (1872–1909), a correspondent for the Associated Press, and the father of actor John Carradine, and the grandfather of actors David, Keith and Robert Carradine; Maude Virginia Carradine Westbrook (born 1874 - died 1956); Guy Carradine (1879–1885); and Lula (1880–1946). Laura died in 1882 at the age of 30.

On August 1, 1883, Carradine married Modesta A.M. Burke (born March 16, 1861, in New Orleans, Louisiana; died April 6, 1924, in Chicago, Illinois) in New Orleans, Louisiana. Their four children were: Burke Carradine (1887–1932); Victoria Carradine (born 1889); Glendy Carradine (born 1890); and Josephine (born 1891).

== Bibliography ==
- Sanctification (1891) ISBN 978-0-88019-379-5
- A Journey to Palestine (1892) ISBN 978-1-4367-3505-6
- The Second Blessing in Symbol (1893)
- The Old Man (1896)
- Sanctified Life (1897) ISBN 978-0-88019-339-9
- The Better Way (1899)
- Soul Help (1900) ISBN 978-0-938037-05-7
- Bible Characters (1907)
- People I Have Met (1910)
- Graphic Scenes (1911) ISBN 978-0-88019-270-5
- Yazoo Stories (1911) ISBN 0-548-46432-4
- Revival Incidents (1913)
- "Mississippi Stories"
