= Carradine family =

American family of actors

- Current region: United States
- Origin: United States
- Members: Beverly Carradine; John Carradine; David Carradine; Keith Carradine; Robert Carradine; Ever Carradine; Martha Plimpton
- Connected members: Michael Bowen (actor); Michael Bowen (artist)
- Traditions: Show business

The Carradine family is an American family of actors. Its family patriarch was the minister Beverly Carradine. His grandson, the actor John Carradine, had five sons, four of whom also became actors.

== List of members ==
The family includes:

Beverly Carradine (1848–1931), married twice:

(i) Laura Green Reid (1851–1882), mother of:
- Ernest Carradine (died 1880)
- William Reed Carradine (1872–1909), a correspondent for the Associated Press; the father of actor John Carradine (see below)
- Maude Virginia Carradine (born 1874)
- Guy Carradine (1879–1885)
- Lula Carradine (1880–1946)
(ii) Modesta A. M. Burke (1861–1924), mother of:
- Burke Carradine (1887–1932)
- Victoria Carradine (born 1889)
- Glendy Carradine (born 1890)
- Josephine (born 1891)

John Carradine (1906–1988), married four times, including:

(i) Ardanelle McCool (marriage 1935–1944)

- Bruce John Carradine (1933–2016), adopted, Ardanelle's son from previous marriage
- David Carradine (born John Arthur Carradine 1936–2009), married five times and had three children and four step-children:

- Calista Carradine (born April 1962), by Donna Lea Becht (1st wife)
- Tom Carradine (born Free Carradine 1972), by Barbara Hershey (domestic partner)
- Kansas Carradine (born May 1978), by Linda Gilbert (2nd wife)
His fifth wife Annie Carradine (born Anne Kirstie Fraser) had four other children from two previous husbands
- Amanda Fraser Eckelberry (born November 29, 1989) by first husband Marc Duke Eckelberry (born in 1954 in California)
- Madeleine Rose (born April 4, 1995) by second husband Dana Richard Bierman (born September 8, 1952, in San Francisco, California – died December 9, 2000, at age 48 of pancreatic cancer in Tarzana, Los Angeles, California)
- Olivia Juliette (born 1998), twin sister of Max, (stepdaughter)
- Max Richard (born 1998), twin brother of Olivia, (stepson)

(ii) Sonia Sorel (marriage 1944–1956)

- Christopher John Carradine (born 1947), architect who became vice president of Walt Disney Imagineering; married to Carolyn Martin since 1979, with three children

- Richard Reed Carradine (born 1970)
- Caitlyn Lace Carradine (born 1982)
- Henry Wolfe Carradine (born 1990)

- Keith Ian Carradine (born 1949)

- Martha Campbell Plimpton (born 1970), by Shelley Plimpton
- Cade Richmond Carradine (born 1982), by Sandra Will (1st wife)
- Sorel Johannah Carradine (born 1985), by Sandra Will (1st wife); actress, married to director Paul Kowalski
- Sean David Carradine (born 2019), by Hayley Dumond (2nd wife)

- Robert Reed Carradine (1954–2026)

- Ever Dawn Carradine (born 1974), by Susan Snyder
- Marica Reed Carradine (born 1990), by Edie Mani (marriage 1990–2018)
- Ian Alexander Carradine (born 1992), by Edie Mani (marriage 1990–2018)

== Roles with other family members ==
John Carradine appeared with his son David in The Good Guys and the Bad Guys (1969) and co-starred with him in Boxcar Bertha (1972) which was produced by Roger Corman and directed by Martin Scorsese. He also appeared in three episodes of the 1970s television series Kung Fu, in which David starred. David's brothers Bruce, Keith and Robert also appeared in the series, with Keith playing David's character as a teenager for a brief period.

Bruce Carradine also appeared with David in Q, The Winged Serpent (1982) and in David's directorial "labor of love", Americana.

David and his half-brothers Keith and Robert appeared together as the Younger brothers in Walter Hill's 1980 film The Long Riders and the three of them appeared in a humorous cameo on The Fall Guy, on an episode on which their father co-starred. Robert also "shot David to death" in a cameo in Scorsese's Mean Streets. Keith was in another of David's directorial attempts, You and Me, while Robert co-starred with David in the unreleased musical which David directed, A Country Mile.

David appeared alongside his half-brother Robert on the eleventh episode of the Disney Channel's Lizzie McGuire, of which Robert was a main character. In this episode, David was cast as a character reminiscent of his Kung Fu character, Kwai Chang Caine. They also appeared together in the 1976 cross country racing film Cannonball.

David and Keith each hosted the History Channel's Wild West Tech and appeared in at least two additional films together, Last Stand at Saber River (for which Keith won an award) and The Outsider.

David's daughter, Calista, appeared in a recurring role on Kung Fu: The Legend Continues. She also had a role in Project Eliminator, with her father. She was the star of the unreleased epic, Mata Hari, which David directed. In addition, she sang the theme to Americana, a song that David wrote called "Around". David appeared with his niece, Ever, in Dead & Breakfast.

Keith's daughter, Martha Plimpton played Andy's best friend, a sarcastic and witty tomboy, Stephanie "Stef" Steinbrenner in The Goonies film, set in Astoria, Oregon.

== Gallery ==
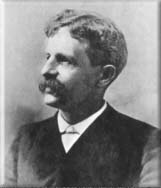
Beverly Carradine

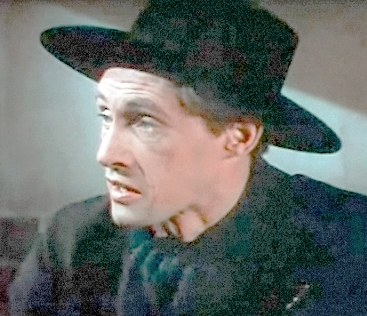
John Carradine

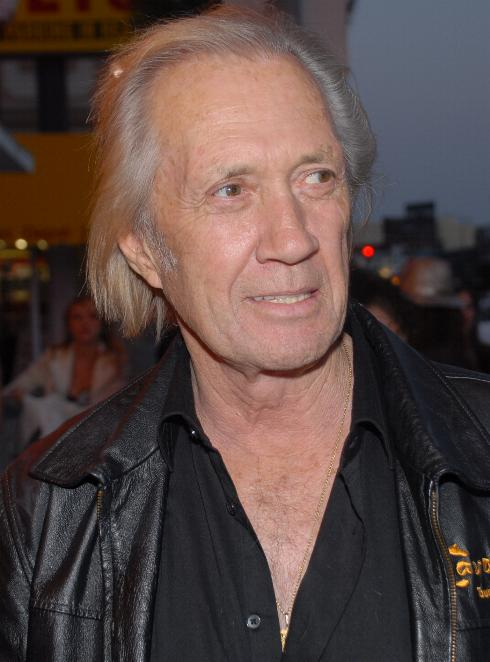
David Carradine

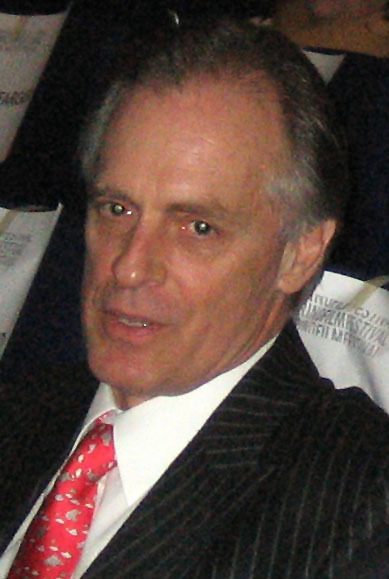
Keith Carradine

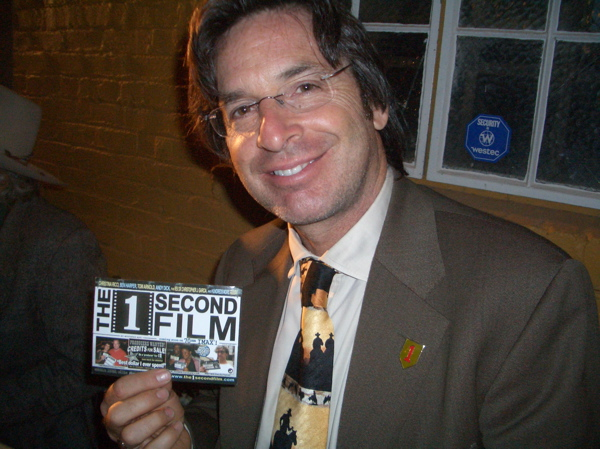
Robert Carradine

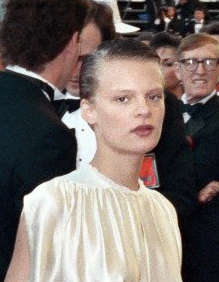
Martha Plimpton

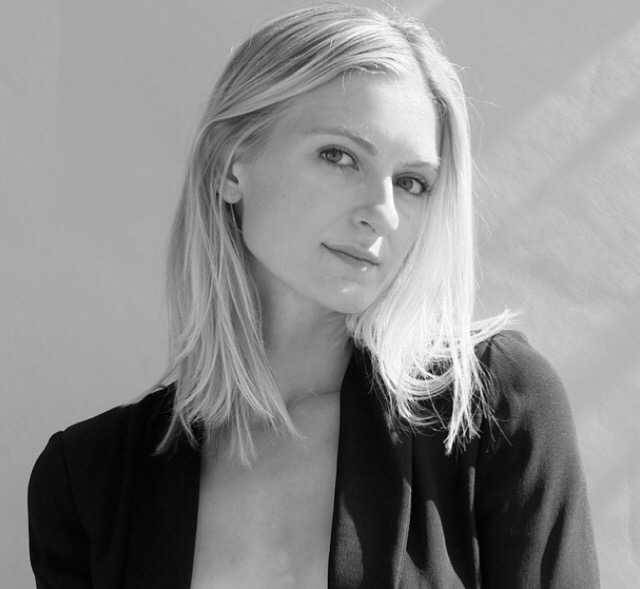
Sorel Carradine
