= Wild West Tech =

Former program on The History Channel

- Starring: Keith Carradine (season 1); David Carradine (seasons 2 and 3)
- Country of origin: United States
- No. of episodes: 34

Production
- Running time: 60 minutes

Original release
- Network: History Channel
- Release: August 19, 2003 – November 8, 2005

Wild West Tech is an American television program that aired on the History Channel in the United States from 2003 to 2005. The show was originally hosted by Keith Carradine (2003–04); his half-brother, David Carradine, took over hosting duties for season 2 onward. The show illustrates a variety of technologies used in the Wild West, and features interviews with numerous Western historians, as well as recreating versions of important events in Western history.

The series was created by Dolores Gavin and supervising producer Louis Tarantino.

== Format ==
Each episode is dedicated to some broader aspect of Wild West life. Once the context is established in brief by the host, more specific elements are developed. Throughout the program, professors, writers, and other experts explain finer points while historical reenactments and dramatizations portray just how key 19th century events may have transpired. The production aims to put the viewer into the spirit of the Old West with its host inhabiting an unnamed frontier town, delivering commentary.

A new spin on the typical technology fact program, this program often covers subjects from the American Old West that are not generally discussed in more traditional settings. For example, one episode takes a look at the brothel, focusing on the inventions and technological innovations used to make the institution of prostitution less harsh on the lives of the women involved.

Another explains that Morphine was first isolated in 1803 by the German pharmacist Friedrich Wilhelm Adam Sertürner, but it was not until the development of the hypodermic needle (1853) that its use spread and it spread quite a bit in the American West. It was used for pain relief and as a "cure" for opium or alcohol addiction. Its extensive use during the American Civil War resulted in over 400,000 people developing the "soldier's disease" (addiction).

The same episode informs the viewers that heroin, along with other drugs, was only criminalized in the United States by the Harrison Narcotics Tax Act of 1914 decades after it was derived.

Other topics include the technological histories of various alcoholic beverages, saloons, weapons, and cowboy gangs.

== Episode guide ==
Two pilot episodes were produced, hosted by Keith Carradine, to help sell the History Channel on the concept of the series. Seasons 2 and 3 were hosted by David Carradine.

=== Pilots ===
No.	Code	Airdate	Title
1	Pilot–1	Aug 25, 2003	Outlaw Tech
2	Pilot–2	Aug 19, 2003	The Gunslingers

=== Season 1 ===
No.	Code	Airdate	Title
1	1–1	Mar 30, 2004	Cowboy Tech
2	1–2	Apr 6, 2004	Execution Tech
3	1–3	Apr 13, 2004	Military Tech
4	1–4	Apr 20, 2004	Hunting Tech
5	1–5	Apr 27, 2004	Western Towns
6	1–6	May 4, 2004	Brothel Tech
7	1–7	May 11, 2004	Native American Tech
8	1–8	May 18, 2004	Train Tech
9	1–9	May 25, 2004	Gambling Tech
10	1–10	Jun 8, 2004	Gold Rush Tech

=== Season 2 ===
No.	Code	Airdate	Title
11	2–1	Nov 9, 2004	Six–Shooter Tech
12	2–2	Nov 16, 2004	Vigilante Tech
13	2–3	Nov 23, 2004	Alamo Tech
14	2–4	Nov 30, 2004	Deadwood Tech
15	2–5	Dec 7, 2004	Massacre Tech
16	2–6	Dec 14, 2004	Biggest Machines in the West
17	2–7	Dec 21, 2004	Freak Show Tech
18	2–8	Dec 28, 2004	Disaster Tech
19	2–9	Jan 25, 2005	Shootout Tech
20	2–10	Feb 1, 2005	Saloons
21	2–11	Feb 15, 2005	Law & Order Tech
22	2–12	Feb 22, 2005	Gang Tech
23	2–13	Mar 22, 2005	The Road West
24	2–14	May 24, 2005	Civil War in the West

=== Season 3 ===
No.	Code	Airdate	Title
25	3–1	Sep 13, 2005	Revenge Tech
26	3–2	Sep 20, 2005	Freak Shows II
27	3–3	Sep 27, 2005	The Unexplained
28	3–4	Oct 4, 2005	Massacres II
29	3–5	Oct 11, 2005	Bounty Hunters
30	3–6	Oct 18, 2005	Vices
31	3–7	Nov 1, 2005	Grim Reaper
32	3–8	Nov 8, 2005	Gadgets
