= Carradice =

Carradice is a surname. Notable people with the surname include:

- Ian Carradice, expert on coinage
- Phil Carradice (born 1947), Welsh writer and broadcaster

== See also ==
- Carradice of Nelson, an English family firm that makes saddlebags and other cycle luggage
- Carradine
