= The Hunter's Moon (film) =

1999 film by Richard C. Weinman

The Hunter’s Moon
- Promotional poster
- Directed by: Richard Weinman
- Written by: John Huff; William Kemper; L. Ford Neale; Richard Weinman
- Produced by: Bill Blake; Jack Chartoff; William Kemper; Howard Smith; Jeff G. Waxman
- Starring: Burt Reynolds; Hayley DuMond; Keith Carradine; Pat Hingle; Ann Wedgeworth; Charles Napier
- Distributed by: Entertainment Around the World Inc.
- Release date: April 9, 1999 (Nashville)
- Running time: 104 min.
- Language: English

The Hunter's Moon is a 1999 American action drama direct-to-video film directed by Richard C. Weinman. Set in the Appalachian mountains, it stars Burt Reynolds, Keith Carradine and Hayley DuMond. Relatively unknown, the film had a limited theatrical release in the Southern United States, and was later released on home video.

== Plot ==
In the Depression era, Turner is a World War I veteran who is haunted not only by memories of the war, but by the civil and economic unrest of the time. He stumbles on a beautiful backwoods mountainside named Samuels Mountain while wandering in the Appalachian Mountains. While camping, he meets Flo, the daughter of tyrannical landowner, Clayton Samuels. Flo is initially infuriated at Turner, who she accuses of spying on her while skinny dipping, but soon the two fall hopelessly in love.

Their burgeoning relationship is threatened by Samuels, who has become fiercely protective of Flo after his wife's death, and killed a number of her previous suitors. There are also dark secrets buried in the Samuels family. Flo, who has taken on the role of matriarch, resents Clayton, who she believes worked her mother to death. Samuels is bitter toward Flo because she is the illegitimate child of his wife and Judge Tully, a corrupt man for whom Samuels runs moonshine. Meanwhile, Samuels's mistress Borlene is also sleeping with his son, dimwitted Jackie Lee.

When Turner and Flo show up at Samuels's supply store, Samuels notices the attraction between the two, and disapproves of their courtship. As Turner tries to convince Flo to run away with him, Samuels determines to end their relationship by any means necessary. He sets traps around the mountain, and he and Jackie Lee hunt Turner down. Turner is forced to draw on his war experience to elude them.

== Cast ==
- Burt Reynolds as Clayton Samuels
- Keith Carradine as Turner
- Hayley DuMond as Florence Irene
- Andrew Hawkes as Jack
- 'Wild' Bill Mock as Bennett (credited as William 'Wild Bill' Mock)
- Pat Hingle as Judge Tully
- Ann Wedgeworth as Borlene
- Willie C. Carpenter as Horace
- Charles Napier as J.T. Conover
- Brion James as Sheriff Foulkes
- Lee Dupree as Mr. Rabe
- April Grace as Mrs. Rabe
- Jim Wilkey as Lonnie
- Kate Barclay as Irene Samuels
- Evan Smith as Rabe Child #1
- Karla Green as Rabe Child #2
- Eve Sadof as Pretty Girl At Dance

== Production ==
The Hunter's Moon was the only film Richard Weinman directed, although he had previously worked on another rural-themed film, 1988's Pumpkinhead. Weinman said that he wanted to explore the subjects of "freedom and people controlling other people's lives".

The film was independently distributed; cowriter and co-executive producer, Bill Kemper, came up with the idea for the movie, and provided most of the funding. Although set in the rural Appalachians, the film was shot in southern California. It had a low budget of under $10 million; the filmmakers were able to cast Reynolds, who had just appeared in Boogie Nights, because he had not yet received the Best Supporting Actor Academy Award nomination that massively boosted his salary. Suki Mendencevin was the film's cinematographer, and soprano Custer LaRue and folk group The Baltimore Consort recorded several traditional Appalachian ballads for the soundtrack.

The Hunter's Moon premiered in April 1999 at 18 theaters in Memphis and Nashville in Tennessee, and Jacksonville, Florida. These were effectively test runs; the filmmakers hoped that it would do well enough in the South for them to release it nationally, as other backwoods films, such as Poor White Trash and Girl from Tobacco Row, had done before it. The movie's reception, however, was tepid, so the hoped-for national release never happened.

In July 1999, The Hunter's Moon was released on home video. Also in 1999, the film was shown at the Long Island International Film Expo in Malverne, New York.

The actors who play the romantic leads, Keith Carradine and Hayley DuMond, met on set. Carradine became smitten with DuMond, several decades his junior, and they started dating. The couple would marry in 2006.

== Critical reception ==
The film received mixed reviews in regional markets. The Commercial Appeal praised the scenery and the lead actors.

The Florida Times-Union gave the movie 1½ stars out of 4, calling it "thinly plotted".

The Tennessean also noted some plot holes, along with places where the low budget was obvious, but praised the story and Reynolds's performance.

On the film's video release, Entertainment Weekly gave it an F rating, and stated that the movie generated "unintentional laughs". However, the film received the Festival Prize when it was shown in Malverne. Writer Wayne Byrne, writing 20 years later, called it "some of Reynolds's very best late-career work".
