= Nashville (soundtrack) =

The Original Motion Picture Soundtrack: Nashville

Soundtrack album by various artists
- Released: 1975
- Recorded: 1974
- Genre: Country
- Length: 40:17
- Label: ABC/Dot; MCA Nashville (2015 reissue)

Professional ratings
Review scores
| Source | Rating |
|---|---|
| AllMusic | 4/5 stars |
| Christgau's Record Guide | C |

Nashville: The Original Motion Picture Soundtrack is a 1975 soundtrack album to the musical comedy-drama film Nashville. Featuring compositions and recordings of original musical numbers written by the cast members, the soundtrack was released by ABC Records. It was reissued in February 2015 MCA Nashville.

== Reception ==
Adam Kellner of AllMusic awarded the album four out of five stars, noting: "The at-times charmingly bad, humorous, or excellent soundtrack to Robert Altman's groundbreaking and influential Nashville isn't to be taken at face value throughout."

At the time of the film's release, Keith Carradine's track "I'm Easy" won an Academy Award and Golden Globe Award Best Original Song.

== Track listing ==
| No. | Title | Writer(s) | Performer(s) | Length |
|---|---|---|---|---|
| 1. | "It Don't Worry Me" | Keith Carradine | Keith Carradine | 2:47 |
| 2. | "Bluebird" | Ronee Blakley | Timothy Brown | 3:25 |
| 3. | "For the Sake of the Children" | Richard Baskin; Richard Reicheg | Henry Gibson | 3:18 |
| 4. | "Keep A-Goin" | Baskin | Henry Gibson | 2:49 |
| 5. | "Memphis" | Karen Black | Karen Black | 2:07 |
| 6. | "Rolling Stone" | Black | Karen Black | 3:57 |
| 7. | "200 Years" | Baskin; Gibson | Henry Gibson | 3:04 |
| 8. | "Tapedeck in His Tractor" | Blakley | Ronee Blakley | 2:20 |
| 9. | "Dues" | Blakley | Ronee Blakley | 3:40 |
| 10. | "I'm Easy" | Carradine | Keith Carradine | 3:02 |
| 11. | "One, I Love You" | Baskin | Henry Gibson; Ronee Blakley | 2:37 |
| 12. | "My Idaho Home" | Blakley | Ronee Blakley | 3:06 |
| 13. | "It Don't Worry Me (reprise)" | Carradine | Barbara Harris | 3:57 |
| Total length: | | | | 40:17 |
