= John Carradine =

American actor (1906–1988)

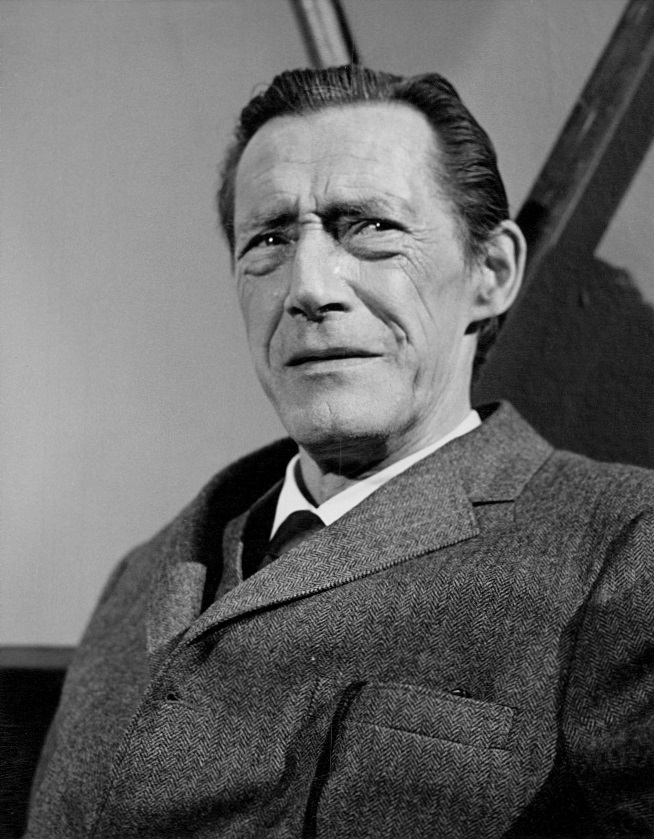
- Carradine in a 1967 publicity photo
- Born: Richmond Reed Carradine; February 5, 1906; New York City, U.S.
- Died: November 27, 1988 (aged 82); Milan, Italy
- Other name: Peter Richmond
- Occupation: Actor
- Years active: 1930–1988
- Spouses: Ardanelle McCool Cosner (m. 1935; div. 1944) Sonia Sorel (m. 1944; div. 1956) Doris Rich (m. 1957; died 1971) Emily Cisneros (m. 1975)
- Children: 5, including David, Keith, and Robert

John Carradine (/ˈkærəˌdiːn/ KARR-ə-deen; born Richmond Reed Carradine; February 5, 1906 – November 27, 1988) was an American character actor, who was considered one of the greatest in American cinema. He was a member of Cecil B. DeMille's stock company and later John Ford's company, known for his roles in horror films, Westerns, and Shakespearean theater, most notably portraying Count Dracula in House of Frankenstein (1944), House of Dracula (1945), Billy the Kid Versus Dracula (1966), and Nocturna: Granddaughter of Dracula (1979). Among his other notable roles was "Preacher Casy" in John Ford's The Grapes of Wrath. In later decades of his career, he starred mostly in low-budget B-movies.

Carradine was married four times, had five children, and was the patriarch of the Carradine family, including four sons and four grandchildren who are or were also actors. In total, he holds 351 film and television credits, making him one of the most prolific English-speaking film and television actors of all time.

== Early life ==
Carradine was born in New York City the son of William Reed Carradine, a correspondent for the Associated Press, and his wife, Genevieve Winnifred Richmond, a surgeon. William Carradine was the son of evangelical author Beverly Carradine. The family lived in Peekskill, New York and Kingston, New York. William Carradine died from tuberculosis when his son John was two years old. Carradine's mother then married "a Philadelphia paper manufacturer named Peck, who thought the way to bring up someone else's boy was to beat him every day just on general principle." Carradine attended the Christ Church School in Kingston and the Episcopal Academy in Merion Station, Pennsylvania, where he developed his diction and his memory skills from portions of the Episcopal Book of Common Prayer meted out as a punishment.

Carradine's son David claimed his father ran away when he was 14 years old. He later returned and studied sculpture at Philadelphia's Graphic Arts Institute. Carradine lived with his maternal uncle, Peter Richmond, in New York City for a while, working in the film archives of the public library. David said that while still a teenager, his father went to Richmond, Virginia, to serve as an apprentice to Daniel Chester French, the sculptor who created the statue of Abraham Lincoln for the Lincoln Memorial in Washington, D.C. (Note: David Carradine recalled that John Carradine had worked as an apprentice to "Samuel Chester French, the artist who fashioned the Lincoln Memorial." However, the sculptor who created the Lincoln statue was Daniel Chester French.) He traveled for a time, supporting himself painting portraits. "If the sitter was satisfied, the price was $2.50," he once said. "It cost him nothing if he thought it was a turkey. I made as high as $10 to $15 a day." During this time, he was arrested for vagrancy. While in jail, Carradine was beaten, suffering a broken nose that did not set correctly. This contributed to "the look that would become world famous."

David Carradine said, "My dad told me that he saw a production of Shakespeare's The Merchant of Venice when he was 11 years old and decided right then what he wanted to do with his life". He made his stage debut in 1925 in New Orleans in a production of Camille and worked for a time in a New Orleans Shakespeare company. Carradine joined a tent repertory theater under the management of R. D. MacLean, who became his mentor. In 1927, he took a job escorting a shipment of bananas from Dallas, Texas to Los Angeles, where he eventually picked up some theater work under the name of Peter Richmond, in homage to his uncle. He became friends with John Barrymore, and began working for Cecil B. DeMille as a set designer. Carradine, however, did not have the job long. "DeMille noticed the lack of Roman columns in my sketches," Carradine said. "I lasted two weeks." Once DeMille heard his baritone voice, however, he hired him to do voice-overs. Carradine said, "the great Cecil B. DeMille saw an apparition – me – pass him by, reciting the gravedigger's lines from 'Hamlet', and he instructed me to report to him the following day." He became a member of DeMille's stock company and his voice was heard in several DeMille pictures, including The Sign of the Cross.

== Career ==
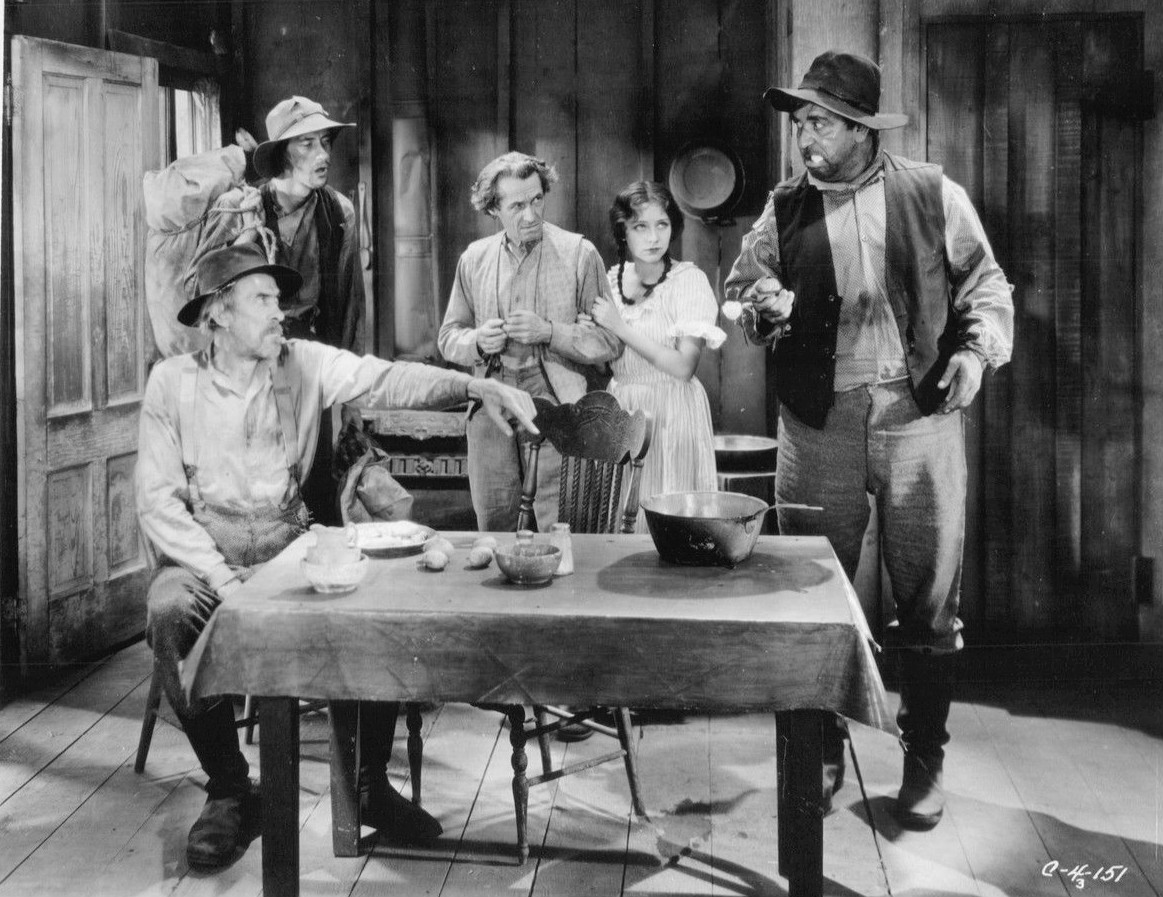
From left: Harlan E. Knight, John Carradine (billed as Peter Richmond), Henry B. Walthall, Joan Peers, and Noah Beery Sr. (1930)

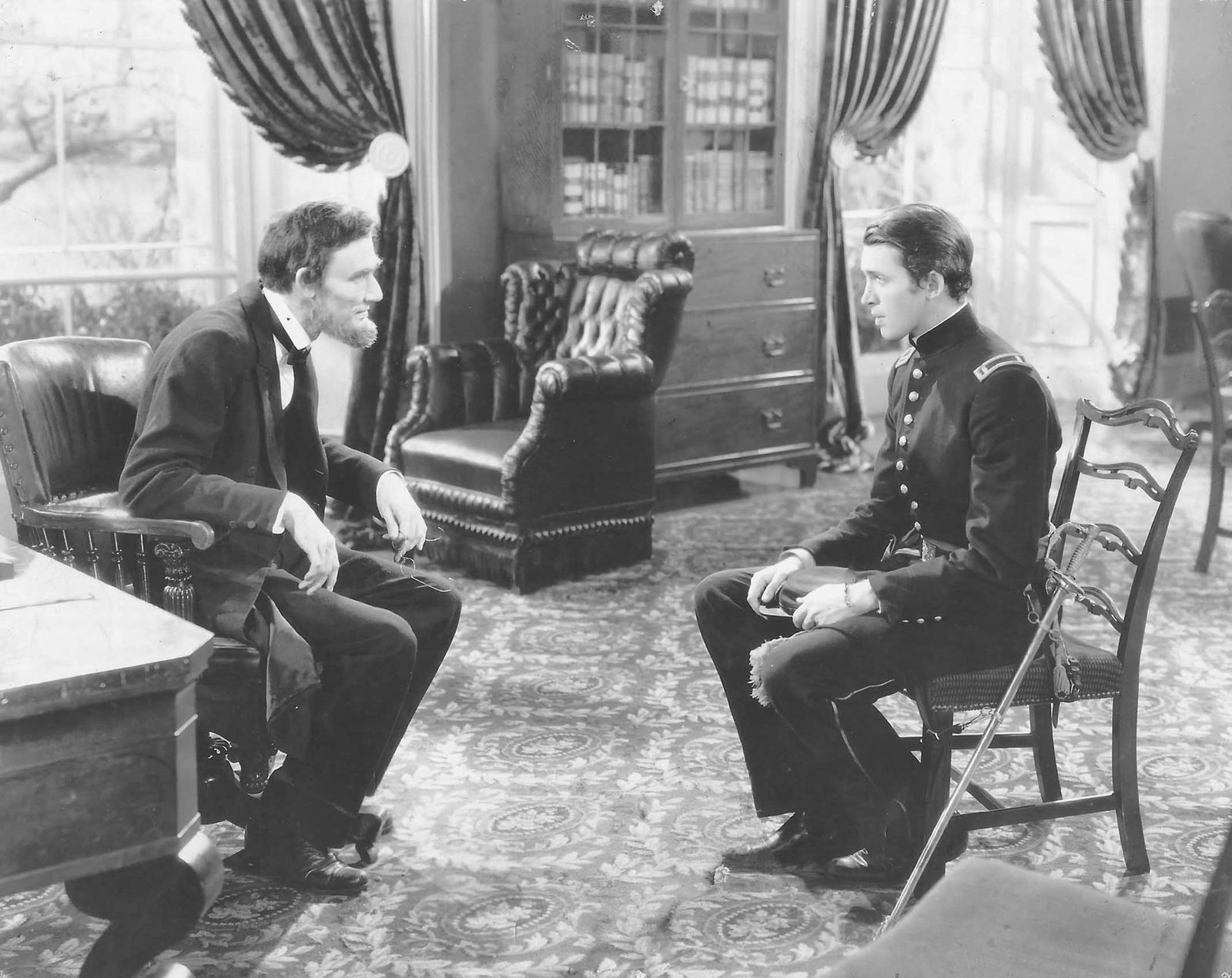
As Abraham Lincoln in Of Human Hearts with James Stewart (1938)

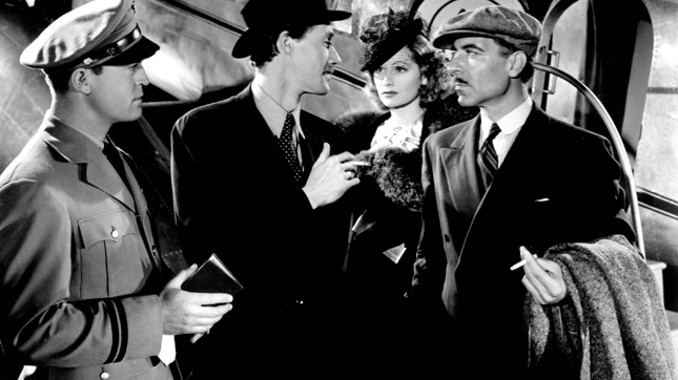
Chester Morris, Carradine, Lucille Ball and Joseph Calleia in Five Came Back (1939)

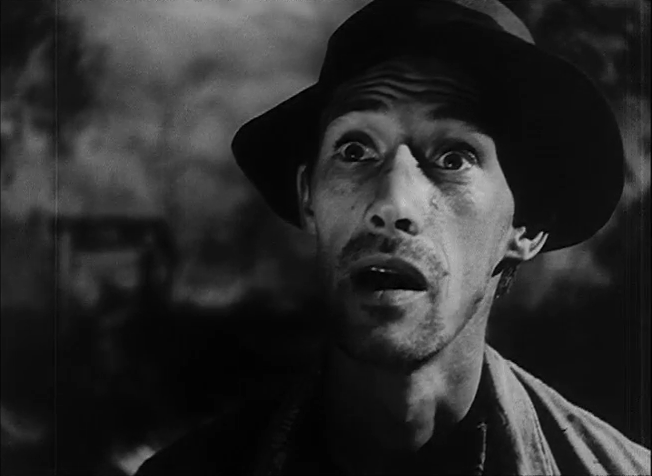
As preacher Casy in The Grapes of Wrath (1940)

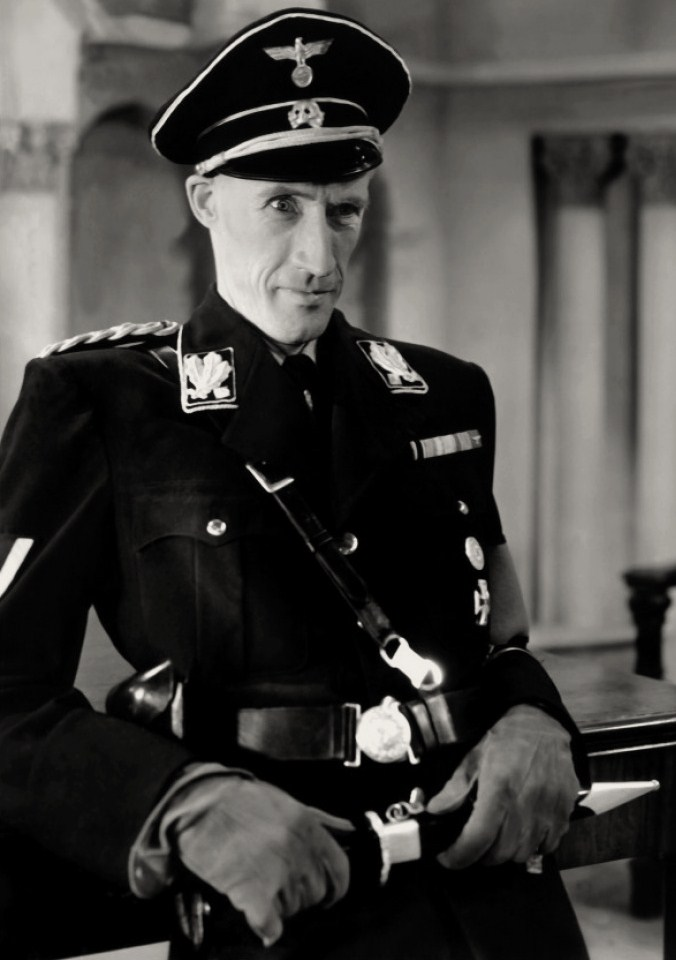
Hitler's Madman (1943)

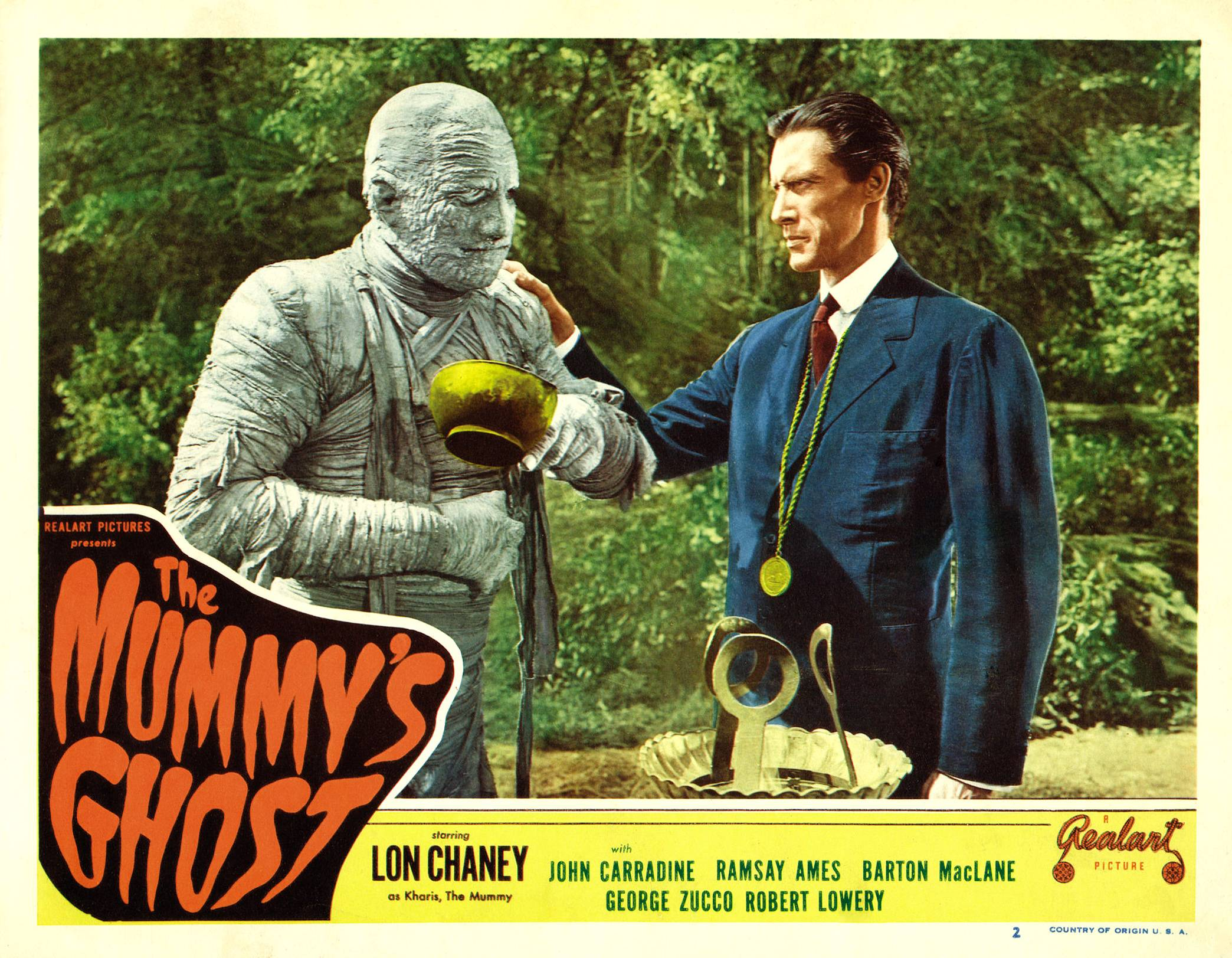
Lobby card with Lon Chaney Jr. and Carradine in The Mummy's Ghost (1944)

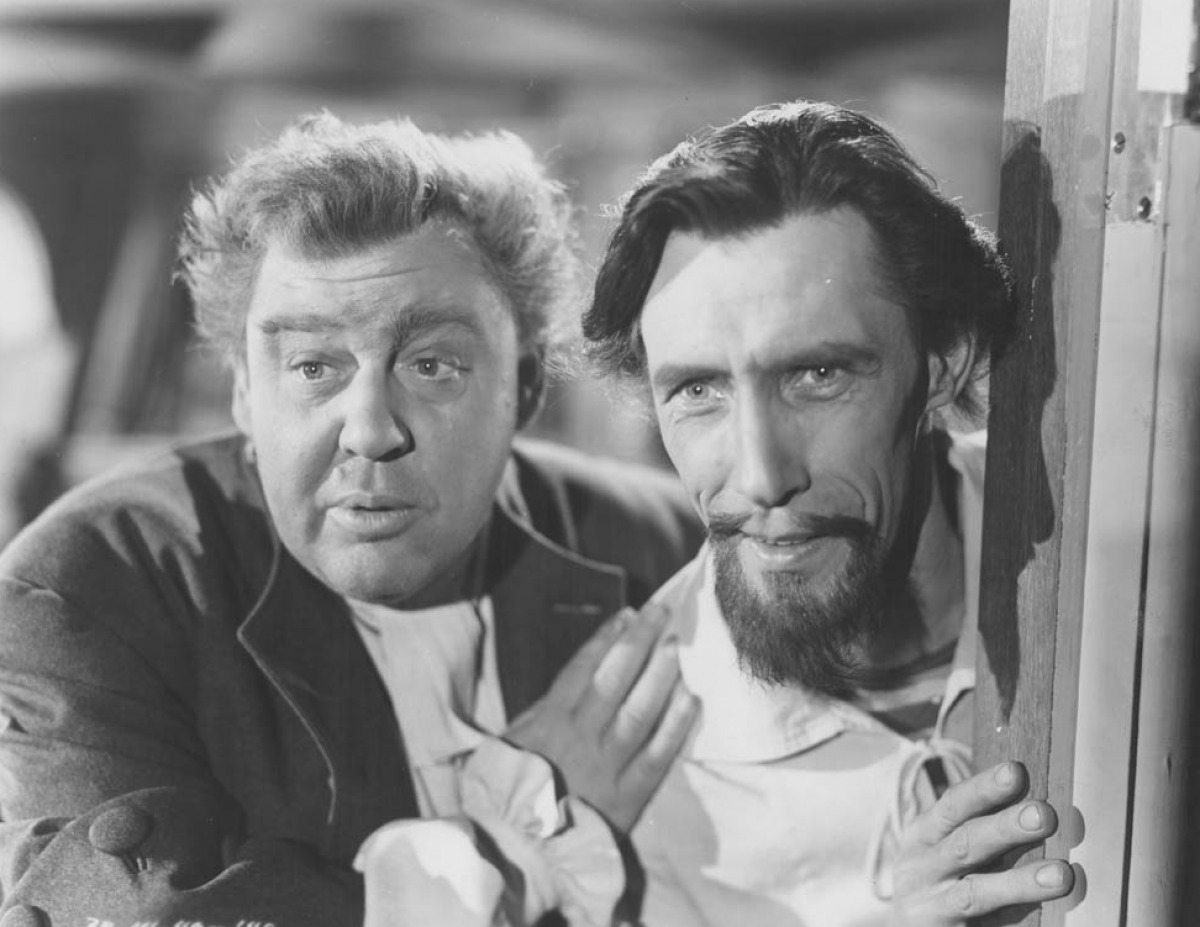
Charles Laughton and Carradine in Captain Kidd (1945)

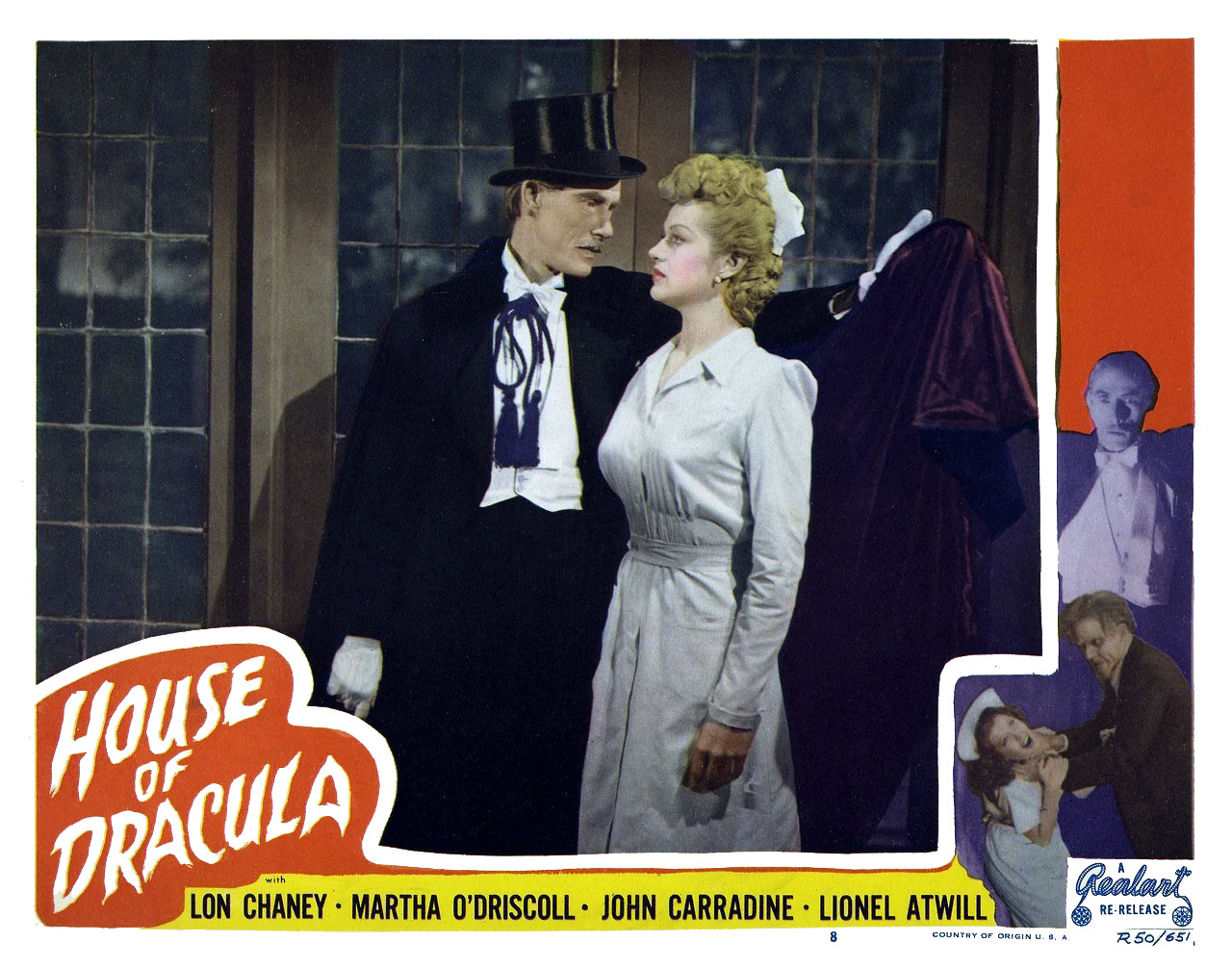
Lobby card with Carradine as Dracula with Martha O'Driscoll in House of Dracula (1945)

Carradine's first film credit was Tol'able David (1930), but he claimed to have done 70 pictures before getting billing. Carradine claimed to have tested, as an unknown – along with well-known leading men Conrad Veidt, William Courtenay, Paul Muni, and Ian Keith – for the title role in Dracula, but the historical record does not support the claim. The part eventually went to Bela Lugosi. Carradine later played the Count in the 1940s Universal Studios Dracula sequels House of Frankenstein and House of Dracula. Carradine also claimed to have tested for the monster role in Frankenstein (1931), though again, no account exists other than his own that he actually did so. By 1933, he was being credited as John Peter Richmond, perhaps in honor of his friend, John Barrymore. He adopted the stage name "John Carradine" in 1935, and legally took the name as his own two years later. In 1935's Bride of Frankenstein, Carradine had a brief uncredited walk-on role as a hunter in the forest.

On April 11, 1934, Wilfred Talbot Smith and Regina Kahl of Ordo Templi Orientis held a "Crowley Night on Winona Blvd." at Agape Lodge. Martin Starr recounts that "it included a program of recitation of [Aleister] Crowley's poetry, rituals and sacred texts... One surprising name was among the participants: the stage and motion picture actor John Carradine... who read the Crowley poem "O Madonna of the Golden Eyes."

By 1936, Carradine had become a member of John Ford's stock company and appeared in The Prisoner of Shark Island. In total, he made 11 pictures with Ford, including his first important role, as Preacher Casy in The Grapes of Wrath (1940). Other Ford films in which Carradine appeared include The Man Who Shot Liberty Valance (1962) and Stagecoach (1939).

He also portrayed the Biblical hero Aaron in DeMille's The Ten Commandments (1956), he dominated Hitler's Madman (1943) as Reinhard Heydrich, and he portrayed Bob Ford in Henry King's 20th Century Fox production Jesse James (1939), among many many others during this time frame.

Carradine did considerable stage work, much of which provided his only opportunity to work in a classic drama context. He toured with his own Shakespearean company in the 1940s, playing Hamlet and Macbeth. His Broadway roles included Ferdinand in a 1946 production of John Webster's The Duchess of Malfi, the Ragpicker in a 13-month run of Jean Giraudoux's The Madwoman of Chaillot, Lycus in a 15-month run of A Funny Thing Happened on the Way to the Forum, and DeLacey in the expensive one-night flop Frankenstein in 1981. He also toured in road companies of such shows as Tobacco Road and Cat on a Hot Tin Roof, in which he was properly emaciated as the cancer-ridden Big Daddy, a part, he said, which Tennessee Williams wrote for him.

Carradine claimed to have appeared in more than 450 movies, but only 225 movies can be documented. His count is closer to fact if theatrical movies, made-for-TV movies, and television programs are included. He often played eccentric, insane, or diabolical characters, especially in the horror genre with which he had become identified as a "star" by the mid-1940s. He occasionally played a heroic role, as in The Grapes of Wrath, in which he played Casy, the ill-fated "preacher", and he occasionally played a sympathetic role, as in Son of Fury: The Story of Benjamin Blake, in which he played Blake's shipmate, who escapes with him to a tropical island full of riches.

He appeared in dozens of low-budget horror films from the 1940s onwards, to finance a touring classical theater company. He also played a small but important role in the very-high-budget comedy The Court Jester, which was at the time of its release the most expensive comedy film ever made. He played a mad scientist in Woody Allen's Everything You Always Wanted to Know About Sex* (*But Were Afraid to Ask). He sang the theme song to one film in which he appeared briefly, Red Zone Cuba. Carradine also made more than 100 acting appearances on television over a period of 39 years. His first performance on the "small screen" was on the DuMont Television Network in 1947, when he played Ebenezer Scrooge in a broadcast presentation of A Christmas Carol. His final role on television was in 1986 as Professor Alex Stottel on a revival of the classic series The Twilight Zone, in an episode segment titled "Still Life." Some examples of other television series on which he appeared include My Friend Flicka, Johnny Ringo (as The Rain Man), and Place the Face, NBC's Cimarron City as the foreboding Jared Tucker in the episode "Child of Fear" and on William Bendix's Overland Trail in the 1960 episode "The Reckoning," on Harrigan and Son starring Pat O'Brien in the episode "A Matter of Dignity," Maverick in "Red Dog" starring Roger Moore and Lee Van Cleef, Sugarfoot, The Rebel, and The Legend of Jesse James, on the syndicated adventure series Rescue 8 with actor Jim Davis and in two episodes of the western TV series Bonanza ("Springtime" and "Dead Wrong"). John Carradine also appeared in 1959 as the mind reader in The Rifleman episode of the same name.

Carradine also made recurring appearances as the mortician Mr. Gateman on the television comedy series The Munsters. He appeared as well in both of Irwin Allen's classic 1960s science-fiction television series Lost in Space and Land of the Giants. In 1975 he was in an episode of Sid and Marty Croft's, "Far Out Space Nuts" with Chuck McCann and Bob Denver. In 1985, Carradine won a Daytime Emmy Award for his performance as an eccentric man who lives by the railroad tracks in the Young People's Special Umbrella Jack.

In 1982, he supplied the voice of the Great Owl in the animated feature The Secret of NIMH. Also, he played the voice of the villainous Wizard in the English-dubbed version of Aladdin and the Magic Lamp by Sync, Ltd. One of Carradine's later appearances was Peggy Sue Got Married in 1986. Carradine's last released film credit was Jack-O, released in 1995, seven years after his death.

Carradine's deep, resonant voice earned him the nickname "The Voice". He was known as the "Bard of the Boulevard" due to his idiosyncratic habit of strolling Hollywood streets while reciting Shakespearean soliloquies, something he always denied.

== Personal life and death ==
Carradine was married four times. He married Ardanelle Abigail McCool (January 25, 1911 – January 26, 1989), in 1935. She was the mother of Bruce and David. John adopted Bruce, Ardanelle's son from a previous marriage. John had planned a large family, but according to the autobiography of his son David, after Ardanelle had had a series of miscarriages, Carradine discovered that she had repeated "coat hanger" abortions, without his knowledge, which rendered her unable to carry a baby to full term. After only three years of marriage, Ardanelle Carradine filed for divorce, but the couple remained married for another five years.

They divorced in 1944 when David was seven years old. Carradine left California to avoid court action in the alimony settlement. After the couple engaged in a series of court battles involving child custody and alimony, which at one point landed Carradine in jail, David joined his father in New York City. By this time, his father had remarried. For the next few years, David was shuffled among boarding schools, foster homes, and reform school.

In 1945, immediately following his divorce from Ardanelle, Carradine married Sonia Sorel (May 18, 1921 – September 24, 2004), who had appeared with him in the 1944 film Bluebeard. Sonia, who had adopted the stage name of Sorel, was the daughter of San Francisco brewer Henry Henius, granddaughter of biochemist Max Henius, and a great-niece of the historian Johan Ludvig Heiberg. Together, Carradine and Sonia had three sons, Christopher, Keith, and Robert. Their divorce in 1957 was followed by an acrimonious custody battle, which resulted in their sons being placed in a home for abused children as wards of the court. Keith Carradine said, "It was like being in jail. There were bars on the windows, and we were only allowed to see our parents through glass doors. It was very sad. We would stand there on either side of the glass door crying."

Eventually, Carradine won custody of the children. For the next eight years, Sonia was not permitted to see the children. Robert Carradine said that he was raised primarily by his stepmother, his father's third wife, Doris (Rich) Grimshaw, and believed her to be his mother until he was introduced to Sonia Sorel at a Christmas party when he was 14 years old. He told a journalist, "I said, 'How do you do?' Keith took me aside and said 'That's our real mother.' I didn't know what he was talking about. But he finally convinced me."

When John Carradine married Doris (Erving Rich) Grimshaw in 1957, she already had a son, Dale, from a previous marriage, and a son, Michael, from a later relationship. Both Dale and Michael, along with Sonia Sorel's son, Michael Bowen, are sometimes counted among John Carradine's eight sons. She was a one-time studio typist who typed the script to The Treasure of the Sierra Madre and who played a few roles in film and television. Doris died in 1971 in a fire in her apartment in Oxnard, California. The fire was caused by a burning cigarette. She had been rescued from a similar fire two weeks earlier. At the time of her death, Carradine and she were separated. Carradine was married a fourth time, from 1975 to his 1988 death, to Emily Cisneros in Oxnard, California.

Carradine in 1981.

Semi-retired by the late 1980s, Carradine suffered from painful and crippling rheumatoid arthritis in the years before he died from heart and kidney failure at the Fatebenefratelli Hospital in Milan, Italy on November 27, 1988, at the age of 82. Hours before he was stricken, he had climbed the 328 steep steps of Milan's Gothic cathedral, the Duomo. According to David Carradine, his father had just finished a film (Buried Alive) in South Africa and was about to begin a European tour. David was with him, reading Shakespeare to him in his hospital bed, when he succumbed to his condition. By the time David and Keith Carradine had arrived at their father's bedside at the hospital, he was unable to speak. "I was told that his last words were, 'Milan: What a beautiful place to die.'" David recalled, "But he never spoke to me or opened his eyes. When he died, I was holding him in my arms. I reached out and closed his eyes. It's not as easy as it is in the movies." There was a mass for John Carradine at St. Thomas the Apostle Episcopal Church in Hollywood. An Irish wake followed, and his body was buried at sea between the California coast and Catalina Island.

== Legacy ==
For his contributions to the film industry, Carradine was inducted into the Hollywood Walk of Fame in 1960 with a motion pictures star located at 6240 Hollywood Boulevard. In 2003, he was inducted into the Western Performers Hall of Fame at the National Cowboy & Western Heritage Museum in Oklahoma City, Oklahoma.

Four of Carradine's five sons became actors: David, Robert, Keith, and Bruce. David had a prolific career, amassing 227 movie and television credits by the time of his death in 2009. He also had a brief Broadway career and produced and directed a number of independent projects. His success often led to work for other members of his family, including his father. The two appeared together in a few films, including The Good Guys and the Bad Guys (1969) and Boxcar Bertha (1972), produced by Roger Corman and directed by Martin Scorsese.

David's television series Kung Fu featured his father John and half-brother Robert in the episode "Dark Angel". John appeared as the same character, the Reverend Serenity Johnson, in two more episodes: "The Nature of Evil" and "Ambush". David's brothers Bruce and Keith appeared in the series, with Keith playing David's character as a teenager for a brief period. David, Keith, and Robert appeared together in a humorous cameo on The Fall Guy, on an episode titled "October the 31st", in which their father co-starred.

Robert appeared with his father in an episode of the first Twilight Zone revival television series in 1986. The episode segment titled "Still Life" featured Robert as a photographer who discovers an unusual camera and his father as a college professor who helps him discover the camera's secret.

== Filmography ==
=== Television roles ===
The following are only a few examples of the many roles John Carradine performed on television between 1947 and 1986:

- My Friend Irma, CBS comedy (1952–1954) as Mr. Corday
- An Evening with Hamlet, CBS comedy (1954) as Cameron Whitfield
- Cheyenne, TV western (1957); episode: "Decision at Gunsight" as Delos Gerrard
- The Restless Gun; episode: "More Than Kin" as Arch
- The Rifleman, TV western (1959); episode: "The Photographer" as Abel Goss, and as the mentalist James Barrow McBride in S1 E40 "The Mind Reader"
- Gunsmoke, TV western (1959) as Kader
- The Twilight Zone (1959); episode: "The Howling Man" (1960) as Brother Jerome
- Maverick; episode: "Red Dog" (1960) starring Roger Moore, Lee Van Cleef and Sherry Jackson
- The Rebel, TV western (1961) as Elmer Dodson
- Lawman, TV western (1962); episode: "The Actor" as Geoffrey Hendon
- The Beverly Hillbillies (1966); episode: "The Great Jethro" as Marvin Bagby/Marvo the Magnificent
- The Munsters (1964–1966) as Mr. Gateman (Herman's boss)
- Lost in Space (television series 1965–1968); episode: "The Galaxy Gift" (April 26, 1967)
- Land of the Giants (television series 1968–1970); episode: "Comeback" (November 23, 1969) as Egor
- Daughter of the Mind (ABC Movie of the Week 1969) as Bosch (December 9, 1969)
- Night Gallery; episode: "Big Surprise/Quoth the Raven/Prof. Peabody's Last Lecture", 1971
- Kung Fu (three episodes: 1972, 1974 and 1975); as Preacher Serenity Johnson, John played opposite his son David, who was the star of the series.
- The Night Strangler (1973) as Llewelyn Crossbinder
- Emergency!; episode: "Daisy's Pick" (November 2, 1974) as Jonas Larson
- Tail Gunner Joe (1977) as Wisconsin Farmer
- The New Adventures of Wonder Woman (1978) as Harlow Gault
- The Fall Guy; episode: "October the 31st" (1984) as Preston Deauville
- The Twilight Zone (1985); episode: "Still Life" (1985) as Professor Stottel

== Gallery ==
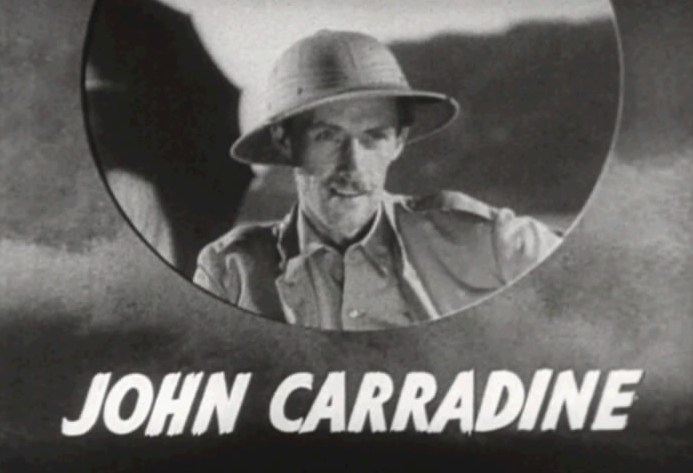
The Hurricane (1937)

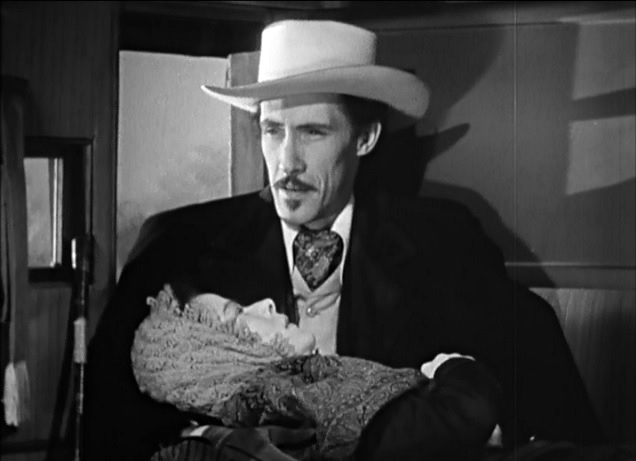
Stagecoach (1939)

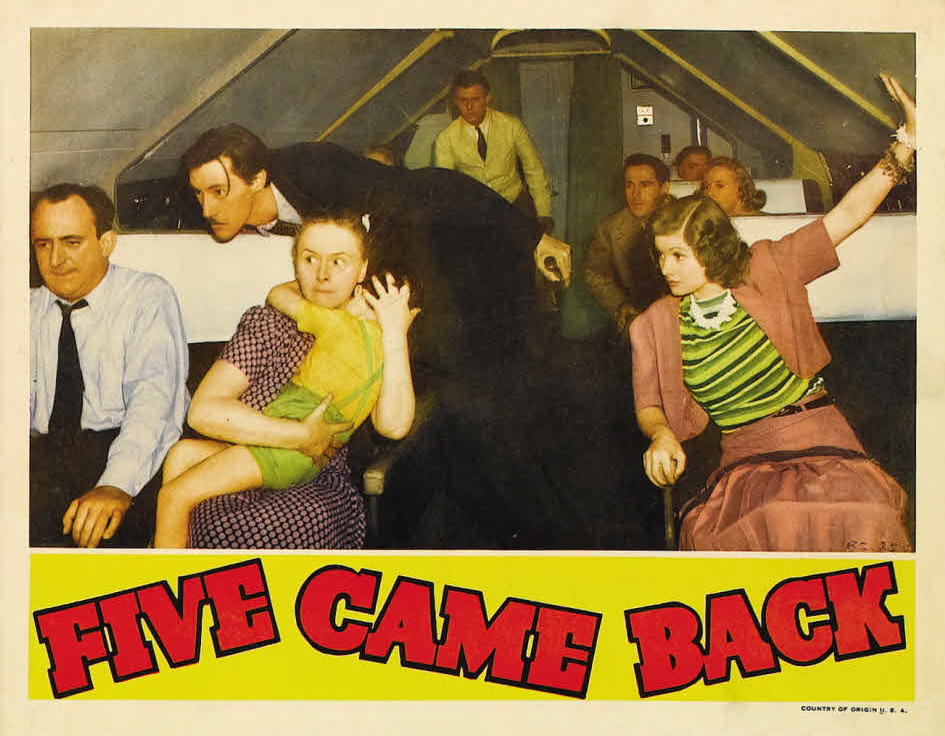
Lucille Ball and Carradine in Five Came Back (1939)

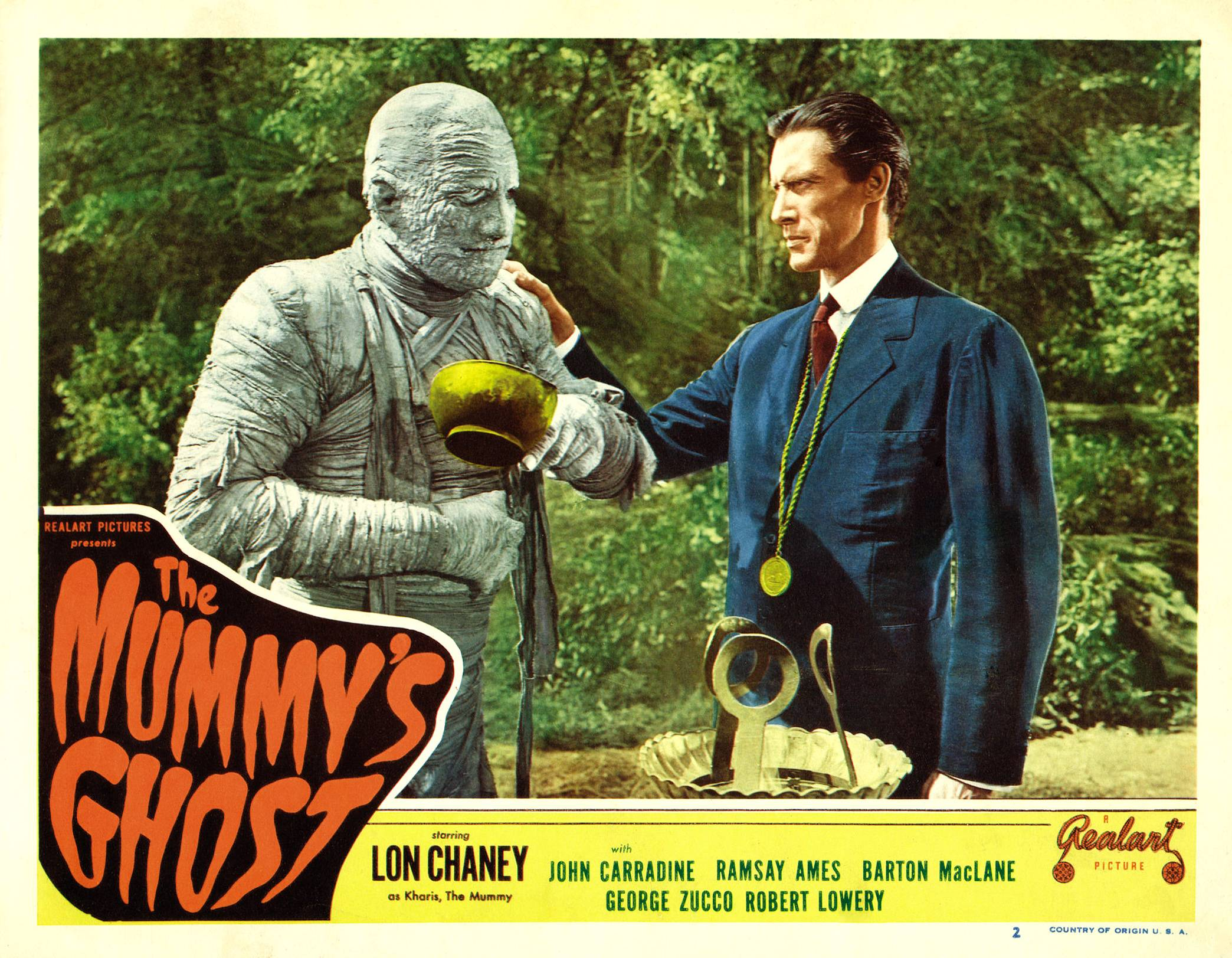
Lon Chaney Jr. and Carradine in The Mummy's Ghost (1944)
