= Sandra Will Carradine =

American actress

- Born: Sandra Will; 1947 or 1948 (age 78–79)
- Occupation: Actress
- Years active: 1976–1990
- Spouse: Keith Carradine (m. 1982; div. 2000)
- Children: 2

Sandra Will Carradine (née Will; born 1947 or 1948 ) is an American film and television actress. She was formerly married to actor Keith Carradine, and around the time of their separation she became involved with Anthony Pellicano, a high-profile Hollywood private investigator who was involved in extensive illegal wiretapping activities. In 2006, she pleaded guilty to perjury for lying under oath about her awareness of Pellicano's wiretapping of Keith Carradine's phone.

== Career ==
She has appeared in various productions, including relatively small roles in episodes of the television series Laverne and Shirley (1976), CHiPs (1977), and The White Shadow (1980–1981), and in the feature films Thank God It's Friday (1978), Choose Me (1984), Cocktail (1988), and Daddy's Dyin': Who's Got the Will? (1990). She also appeared in television advertisements for milk and Close-Up toothpaste.

=== Involvement in Telluride community ===
She initially visited Telluride, Colorado, in 1980 for the Telluride Film Festival. In 1991, she and then-husband Keith Carradine founded the Sheridan Arts Foundation in Telluride to save and restore its historic Sheridan Opera House. Around the same time, she and her husband purchased a 6,000-square-foot (560 m^{2}) home in Telluride in 1992 from the estate of music promoter Bill Graham, who had died in a helicopter crash in 1991.

On April 1, 1994, she herself was involved in a helicopter crash on a heli-skiing excursion in the Telluride area, along with her son, supermodel/actress Christie Brinkley, Colorado real estate mogul Richard Taubman (whom Brinkley would marry later that year), a ski guide, and a pilot. She suffered a minor injury in the crash, while Taubman was seriously injured. Two days later, Disney CEO Frank Wells was killed in a similar incident in Nevada.

== Personal life ==
She is the ex-wife of actor Keith Carradine. They were married on February 6, 1982, and had two children: Cade Richmond Carradine, born on July 19, 1982, and Sorel Johannah Carradine, born on June 18, 1985. They separated in 1993, and she filed for divorce on November 16, 1999.

=== Legal issues ===
Their bitter divorce dispute led to a scandal and her federal criminal prosecution in Los Angeles involving the infamous Hollywood private investigator Anthony Pellicano, who gathered evidence to help with her divorce case, and with whom she became romantically involved. On January 6, 2006, she pleaded guilty to perjury for testifying that she did not know about illegal wiretaps that Pellicano placed on her ex-husband's phone. Pellicano was also involved in many other cases besides that of the Carradines, and his actions became notorious. He was eventually convicted of various charges including racketeering and wiretapping, and a significant number of other people were also convicted of crimes associated with their involvement with his illegal activities, including Beverly Hills police officer Craig Stevens, Los Angeles police officer Mark Arneson, film director John McTiernan, and others.

She subsequently cooperated with investigators related to the Pellicano investigations, and was sentenced on February 8, 2010, to 400 hours of community service, two years of probation, and a $10,000 fine.

She underwent some financial hardship, letting an architecturally historic apartment building she owned fall into disrepair due to lack of maintenance, and eventually defaulting on the mortgage for the building.

In 2009, she offered her beach home in the Rincon Point gated community in Carpinteria, California (near Santa Barbara and Ventura), for sale for $4.29 million. She had purchased the home in 1991 after enrolling her son in a prep school in the area.

In 2013, she offered her Telluride home for sale for $8 million, while the home was in the midst of foreclosure proceedings with an outstanding principal of approximately $3.5 million.

== Filmography ==
=== Film ===
Year	Title	Role	Notes
1978	Thank God It's Friday	Miss Negative	
1983	Imps*	Sheila	
1984	Choose Me	Ida	
1988	Cocktail	Job Interviewer	
1990	Daddy's Dyin'... Who's Got the Will?	Jeannie	

=== Television ===
Year	Title	Role	Notes
1976	Laverne & Shirley	Monika	Episode: "Dear Future Model"
1977	CHiPs	Sheila	Episode: "Hustle"
1978	Go West, Young Girl	Gilda Corin	Television film
1980, 1981	The White Shadow	Marlene Sandler	2 episodes
1988	My Father, My Son	Ann	Television film
1989	The Forgotten	Major White	Television film
