= Keith Carradine =

American actor (born 1949)

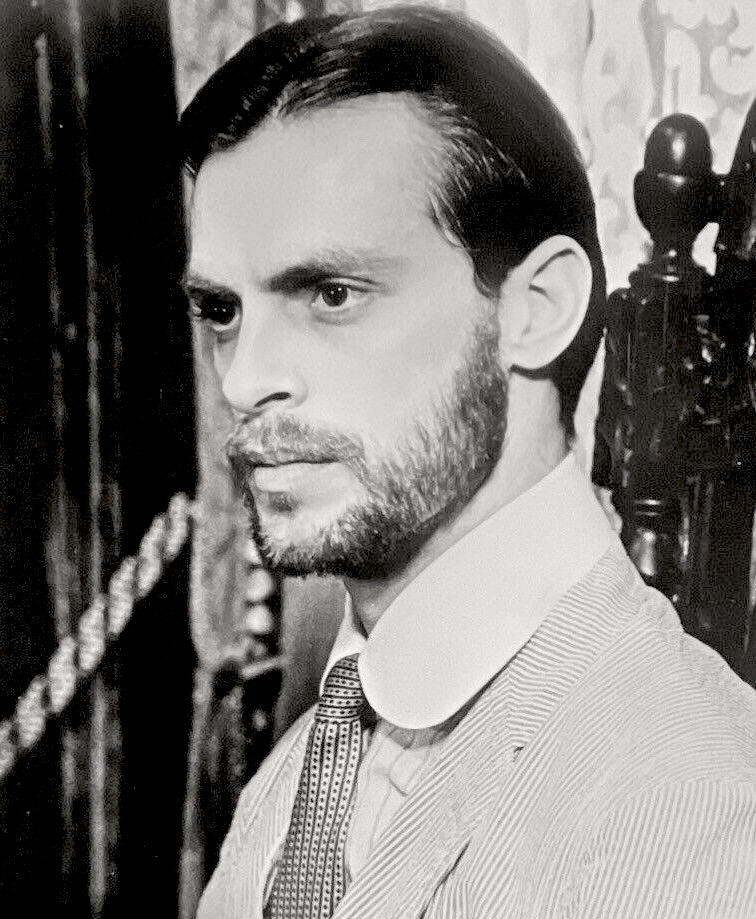
- Carradine in Pretty Baby (1978)
- Born: Keith Ian Carradine; August 8, 1949 (age 77); San Mateo, California, U.S.
- Occupation: Actor
- Years active: 1969–present
- Spouses: Sandra Will (m. 1982; div. 1999); Hayley DuMond (m. 2006)
- Children: 4, including Martha Plimpton
- Parent: John Carradine
- Relatives: Robert Carradine (brother); David Carradine (paternal half-brother); Michael Bowen (maternal half-brother); Max Henius (great-grandfather); Johan Ludvig Heiberg (great-granduncle)
- Family: Carradine

Keith Ian Carradine (/ˈkærədiːn/ KARR-ə-deen; born August 8, 1949) is an American actor. In film, he is known for his roles as Tom Frank in Robert Altman's Nashville, E. J. Bellocq in Louis Malle's Pretty Baby, and Mickey in Alan Rudolph's Choose Me. On television, he is known for his roles as Wild Bill Hickok on the HBO series Deadwood, FBI agent Frank Lundy on the Showtime series Dexter, Lou Solverson in the first season of FX's Fargo, Penny's father Wyatt on the CBS sitcom The Big Bang Theory, and U.S. President Conrad Dalton on the CBS political drama Madam Secretary.

He is a member of the Carradine family of actors which began with his father, John Carradine.

== Early life ==
Carradine was born August 8, 1949, in San Mateo, California. He is a son of actress and artist Sonia Sorel (née Henius), and actor John Carradine. His full brothers are Christopher and Robert Carradine, both of whom are actors. His paternal half-brothers are Bruce and David Carradine. His maternal half-brother is Michael Bowen. His maternal great-grandfather was biochemist Max Henius, and his maternal great-grandmother was the sister of historian Johan Ludvig Heiberg.

Carradine's childhood was troubled; he has said that his father drank and his mother "was a manic depressive paranoid schizophrenic catatonic—she had it all." His parents divorced in 1957, when he was eight years old. A bitter custody battle led to his father gaining custody of him and his brothers, Christopher and Robert, after the children had spent three months in a home for abused children as wards of the court. Keith said of the experience, "It was like being in jail. There were bars on the windows, and we were only allowed to see our parents through glass doors. It was very sad. We would stand there on either side of the glass door crying." He was raised in San Mateo primarily by his maternal grandmother, and he rarely saw either of his parents. His mother was not permitted to see him for eight years following the custody settlement.

Carradine attended Ojai Valley School, where he was active in the school's theater department, performing in productions of Aria da Capo and The Madwoman of Chaillot. After high school, Carradine entertained the thought of becoming a forest ranger, and enrolled at Colorado State University in Fort Collins. "I had this idyllic fantasy of sitting somewhere communing with nature and chatting with the bears," he recalled, "[but] I didn't want to have to learn anything." He changed his major to drama after enrolling, but dropped out after one semester and returned to California, moving in with his older half-brother, David, who encouraged him to pursue an acting career, paid for his acting and vocal lessons, and helped him get an agent.

== Career ==
=== Stage ===
As a youth, Carradine had opportunities to appear on stage with his father in the latter's productions of Shakespeare. Thus, he had some background in theater when he was cast in the original Broadway run of Hair (1969), which launched his acting career. In that production he started out in the chorus and worked his way up to the lead roles playing Woof and Claude. He said of his involvement in Hair, "I really didn't plan to audition. I just went along with my brother, David, and his girlfriend at the time, Barbara Hershey, and two of their friends. I was simply going to play the piano for them while they sang, but I'm the one the staff wound up getting interested in."

In 1991, he received a nomination for the Tony Award for Best Actor in a Musical as the title character in the Best Musical-winning musical, The Will Rogers Follies in 1991 , for which he also received a nomination for the Drama Desk Award for Outstanding Actor in a Musical. He won the Outer Critics Circle Award for Foxfire with Hume Cronyn and Jessica Tandy, and appeared as Lawrence in Dirty Rotten Scoundrels at the Imperial Theater. In 2008, he appeared as Dr. Farquhar Off-Broadway in Mindgame, a thriller by Anthony Horowitz, directed by Ken Russell, who made his New York directorial debut with the production. In March and April 2013, he starred in the Broadway production of Hands on a Hardbody, for which he was nominated for the Tony Award for Best Featured Actor in a Musical and the Drama Desk Award for Outstanding Featured Actor in a Musical.

=== Film ===
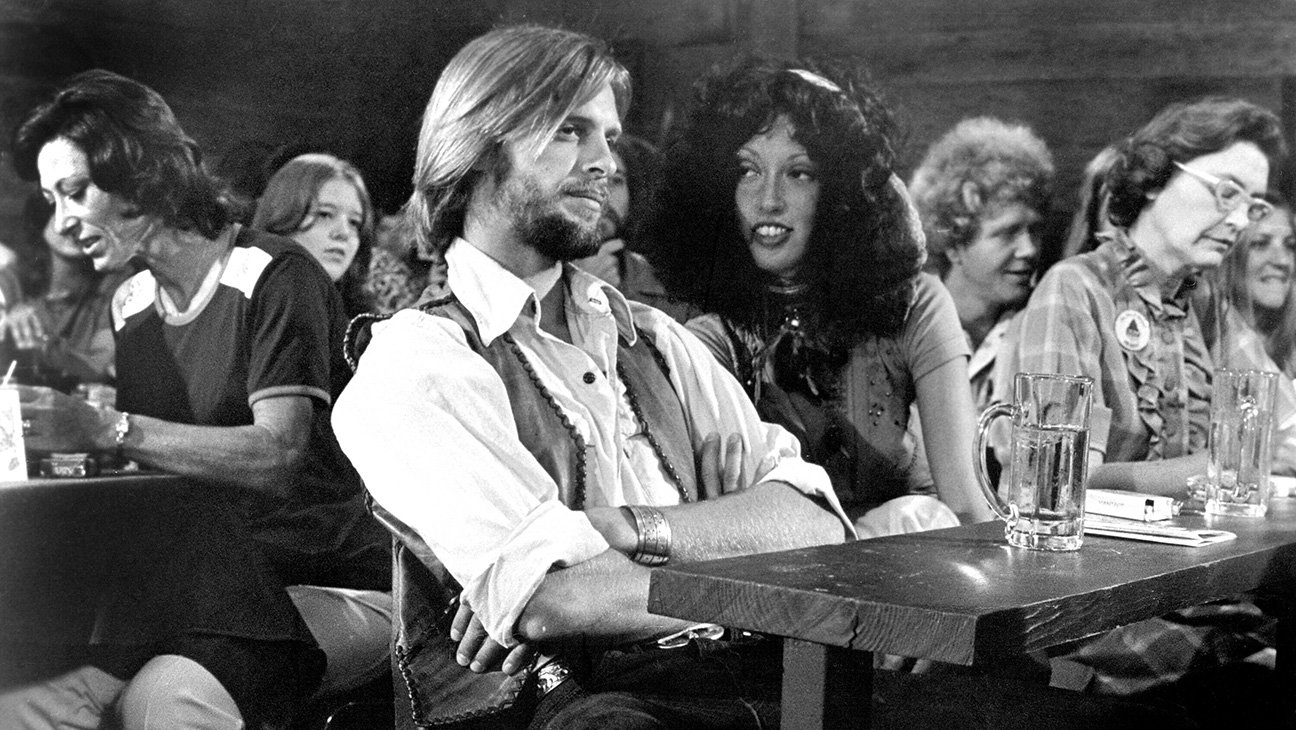
Carradine and Shelley Duvall in Nashville (1975)

Carradine's first notable film appearance was in director Robert Altman's McCabe & Mrs. Miller in 1971. That same year, he co-starred with Kirk Douglas and Johnny Cash in A Gunfight. His next film, Emperor of the North Pole (1973), was re-released with a shorter title Emperor of the North. The film was directed by Robert Aldrich and also starred Lee Marvin and Ernest Borgnine. Carradine then starred in Altman's film Thieves Like Us (1974), then played a principal character, a callow, womanizing folk singer, Tom Frank, in Altman's critically acclaimed film Nashville (1975; see "Music and songwriting"). He had difficulty shaking the image of Tom Frank following the popularity of the film. He felt the role gave him the reputation of being "a cad."

In 1977, Aldrich said "I think that Keith Carradine, if he's careful—I don't think he is careful—and if he's prudent about the selection of his parts, can be a great big movie star. I think that whoever's advising him is making some terrible selections about material. Because I think the guy is gifted, he's talented, he's attractive."

In 1977, Carradine starred opposite Harvey Keitel in Ridley Scott's The Duellists. Pretty Baby followed in 1978. He has acted in several offbeat films of Altman's protege Alan Rudolph, playing a disarmingly candid madman in Choose Me (1984), an incompetent petty criminal in Trouble in Mind (1985), and an American artist in 1920s Paris in The Moderns (1988).

He appeared with brothers David and Robert as the Younger brothers in Walter Hill's film The Long Riders (1980). Keith played Jim Younger in that film. In 1981, he appeared again under Hill's direction in Southern Comfort. In 1994, he had a cameo role as Will Rogers in Rudolph's film about Dorothy Parker, Mrs. Parker and the Vicious Circle. He co-starred with Daryl Hannah as homicidal sociopath John Netherwood in the thriller The Tie That Binds (1995). In 2011, he starred in Cowboys and Aliens, an American science fiction western film directed by Jon Favreau also starring Daniel Craig, Harrison Ford, and Olivia Wilde. Carradine traveled to Tuscany in 2012 to executive produce and star in John Jopson's Edgar Allan Poe inspired film Terroir. In 2013, he starred in Ain't Them Bodies Saints, which won the 2013 Sundance Film Festival award for cinematography. In 2016 Keith played Edward Dickinson, father of Emily Dickinson, in a biographical film directed and written by Terence Davies about the life of the American poet, in A Quiet Passion.

In 2016, Carradine returned to star in his fourth Alan Rudolph film Ray Meets Helen, which was the final screen appearance of Sondra Locke.

=== Music and songwriting ===
His brother, David, said in an interview that Keith could play any instrument he wanted, including bagpipes and the French horn. Like David, Keith integrated his musical talents with his acting performances. In 1975, he performed a song he had written, "I'm Easy", in the movie Nashville. It was a popular hit, and Carradine won a Golden Globe and an Oscar for Best Original Song for the tune. This led to a brief singing career; he signed a contract with Asylum Records and released two albums – I'm Easy (1976) and Lost & Found (1978). His song "Mr. Blue" was number 44 in the Canadian AC charts in April 1978. In 1984, he appeared in the music video for Madonna's single "Material Girl". In the early 1990s, he played the lead role in the Tony Award–winning musical The Will Rogers Follies.

=== Television ===
In 1972, Carradine appeared briefly in the first season of the hit television series, Kung Fu, which starred his brother, David. Keith played a younger version of David's character, Kwai Chang Caine. In 1984, he starred alongside Tuesday Weld in the TV movie Scorned and Swindled. In 1987, he starred in the highly rated CBS miniseries Murder Ordained, with JoBeth Williams and Kathy Bates. Other TV appearances include My Father My Son (1988). In 1983, he appeared as Foxy Funderburke, a murderous pedophile, in the television miniseries Chiefs, based on the Stuart Woods novel of the same name. His performance in Chiefs earned him a nomination for an Emmy Award in the "Outstanding Supporting Actor in a Limited Series or a Special" category. Carradine also starred in the ABC sitcom Complete Savages, and he played Wild Bill Hickok in the HBO series Deadwood.

Carradine hosted the documentary Wild West Tech series on the History Channel in the 2003–2004 season, before handing the job over to his brother, David. In the 2005 miniseries Into the West, produced by Steven Spielberg and DreamWorks, Carradine played Richard Henry Pratt. During the second and fourth seasons of the Showtime series Dexter, he appeared numerous times as FBI Special Agent Frank Lundy. Carradine is credited with guest starring twice on the suspense-drama Criminal Minds, as the psychopathic serial killer Frank Breitkopf. Other shows he appeared in include The Big Bang Theory (as Penny's father Wyatt), Star Trek: Enterprise ("First Flight" episode) and the Starz series Crash. Carradine also made a guest appearance on NCIS in 2014. Also in 2014, he had a recurring role as Lou Solverson in the FX series Fargo, followed by a recurring role as President Conrad Dalton on Madam Secretary.

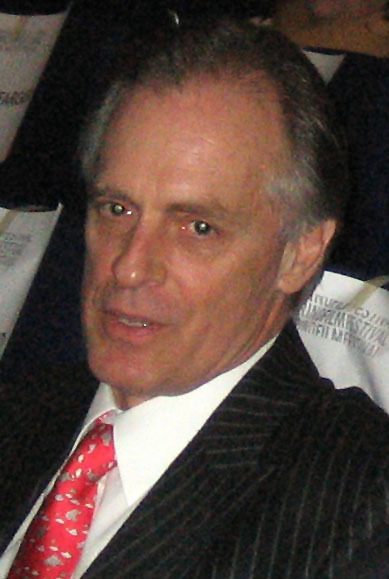
Carradine in 2006

In July 2016, Carradine hosted a month-long series of Western films on Turner Classic Movies. He appeared in dozens of wraparounds on the channel, discussing such films as Stagecoach, featuring his father, and McCabe & Mrs. Miller, in which he himself appears in a small role.

In 2026, Carradine guest-starred on the ABC crime show High Potential.

=== Video games ===
In 2012, Carradine lent his voice to the video game Hitman: Absolution, voicing the primary antagonist Blake Dexter.

== Personal life ==
In 1968, Carradine met actress Shelley Plimpton when they starred in the Broadway musical Hair. She was married to actor Steve Curry, although they were separated; she and Carradine became romantically involved. After Carradine left the show and was in California, he learned that Shelley was pregnant and had reunited with Curry. He met his daughter, actress and singer Martha Plimpton, when she was four years old, after Shelley and Steve Curry had divorced. He said of Shelley, "She did a hell of a job raising Martha. I was not there. I was a very young man, absolutely terrified. She just took that in, and then she welcomed me into Martha's life when I was ready."

Carradine married Sandra Will on February 6, 1982. They were separated in 1993, before Will filed for divorce in 1999. The couple had two children: actors Cade Richmond Carradine and Sorel Johannah Carradine. In 2006, Will pleaded guilty to two counts of perjury for lying to a grand jury about her involvement in the Anthony Pellicano wiretapping scandal. She hired and then became romantically involved with Pellicano after her divorce from Carradine. According to FBI documents, Pellicano tapped Carradine's telephone and recorded calls between him and girlfriend Hayley Leslie DuMond at Will's request, along with DuMond's parents. Carradine filed a civil lawsuit against Will and Pellicano, which was settled in 2013 before it went to trial.

On November 18, 2006, Carradine married actress Hayley DuMond, in Turin, Italy. They met in 1997 when they co-starred in the Burt Reynolds film The Hunter's Moon.

== Filmography ==
=== Film ===
Year	Title	Role	Notes
1971	McCabe & Mrs. Miller	Cowboy	
1971	A Gunfight	The Young Gunfighter	
1973	Emperor of the North Pole	"Cigaret"	
1973	Idaho Transfer	Arthur	
1973	Hex	Archibald "Whizzer" Overton	
1974	Antoine and Sebastian	John	
1974	Thieves Like Us	Bowie	
1974	Run, Run, Joe!	Joe	
1975	Nashville	Tom Frank	Academy Award for Best Original Song; Golden Globe Award for Best Original Song
1975	You and Me	Death Guy	
1976	Lumière	David	
1976	Welcome to L.A.	Carroll Barber	
1977	The Duellists	Armand D'Hubert	
1978	Pretty Baby	E.J. Bellocq	
1978	Sgt. Pepper's Lonely Hearts Club Band	Our Guests At Heartland	
1979	Old Boyfriends	Wayne Van Til	
1979	An Almost Perfect Affair	Hal Raymond	
1980	The Long Riders	Jim Younger	
1981	Southern Comfort	Private First Class Spencer	
1984	Choose Me	Mickey	
1984	Maria's Lovers	Clarence Butts	
1985	Trouble in Mind	"Coop" Cooper	
1986	The Inquiry	Tito Valerio Tauro	
1988	The Moderns	Nick Hart	
1988	Backfire	Reed	
1989	Street of No Return	Michael	
1989	Cold Feet	Monte Latham	
1990	Daddy's Dyin': Who's Got the Will?	Clarence	
1990	The Bachelor	Dr. Emil Gräsler	
1991	The Ballad of the Sad Cafe	Marvin Macy	
1992	CrissCross	John Cross	
1994	Andre	Harry Whitney	
1994	Mrs. Parker and the Vicious Circle	Will Rogers	
1995	The Tie That Binds	John Netherwood	
1995	Wild Bill	William Frederick "Buffalo Bill" Cody	
1996	2 Days in the Valley	Detective Creighton	
1997	A Thousand Acres	Ty Smith	
1998	Standoff	Zeke Clayton	
1999	The Hunter's Moon	Turner	
1999	Out of the Cold	Dan Scott	
2001	Cahoots	Matt	
2001	Wooly Boys	Sheriff Hank Dawson	
2002	Falcons	Simon	
2002	The Angel Doll	Adult Jerry Barlow	
2002	The Outsider	Noah Weaver	
2003	The Adventures of Ociee Nash	Papa George Nash	
2004	Hair High	Joe "JoJo" (voice)	
2004	Balto III: Wings of Change	Duke (voice)	Direct-to-DVD
2005	Our Very Own	Billy Whitfield	
2005	The Californians	Elton Tripp	
2007	Elvis and Anabelle	Jimmy	
2007	The Death and Life of Bobby Z	Johnson	
2007	All Hat	Pete Culpepper	
2008	Lake City	Royce "Roy"	
2009	Winter of Frozen Dreams	Detective Lulling	
2010	Peacock	Mayor Ray Crill	
2011	The Family Tree	Reverend Diggs	
2011	Cowboys & Aliens	Sheriff Taggart	
2013	Ain't Them Bodies Saints	Skerritt	
2014	Cowgirls 'n Angels: Dakota's Summer	Austin Rose	
2014	Terroir	Jonathan Bragg	
2016	A Quiet Passion	Edward Dickinson	
2017	Ray Meets Helen	Ray	
2018	The Old Man & the Gun	Captain Calder	
2021	The Power of the Dog	Governor Edward	
2022	A Nashville Country Christmas	Keaton Walker	
2024	Afraid	Marcus	
2027	Skeletons	Role Not Yet Announced	Filming

=== Television ===
Year	Title	Role	Notes	Nomination
1971	Bonanza	Ern	Episode: "Bushwacked"	
1972	Love, American Style	George Pomerantz	Episode: "Love and the Anniversary"	
1972	Man on a String	Danny Brown	Television movie	
1972–1973	Kung Fu	Middle Caine	Episodes: "Pilot" and "The Tide"	
1980	A Rumor of War	Lieutenant Murphy "Murph" McCloy	Television movie	
1983	Chiefs	"Foxy" Funderburke	3 episodes	Primetime Emmy Award for Outstanding Supporting Actor in a Limited Series or a Special
1984	The Fall Guy	Cook	Episode: "October the 31st"	
1984	Scorned and Swindled	John Boslett	Television movie	
1985	Blackout	Allen Devlin	Television movie	
1986	Half a Lifetime	J.J.	Television movie	CableACE Award for Best Actor in a Theatrical or Dramatic Special
1986	A Winner Never Quits	Pete Gray	Television movie	
1987	Murder Ordained	Trooper John Rule	Television movie	
1987	Eye on the Sparrow	James Lee	Television movie	
1988	Stones for Ibarra	Richard Everton	Television movie	
1988	My Father, My Son	Lieutenant Elmo Zumwalt III	Television movie	
1989	The Revenge of Al Capone	Michael Rourke	Television movie	
1989	Hallmark Hall of Fame	Richard Everton	Episode: "Stones for Ibarra"	
1989	Confessional	Liam Devlin	4 episodes	
1989	The Forgotten	Captain Tom Watkins	Television movie	
1990	Judgment	Pete Guitry	Television movie	
1991	Payoff	Peter "Mac" McAllister	Television movie	
1992	Lincoln	William Herndon (voice)	Television movie	
1994	In the Best of Families: Marriage, Pride & Madness	Tom Leary	Television movie	
1994	Is There Life Out There?	Brad	Television movie	
1995	Trial by Fire	Owen Turner	Television movie	
1996	Special Report: Journey to Mars	Captain Eugene T. Slader	Television movie	
1996	Dead Man's Walk	William "Bigfoot" Wallace	3 episodes	
1997	Perversions of Science	Arthur Bristol	Episode: "Dream of Doom"	
1997	Keeping the Promise	William "Will" Hallowell	Television movie	
1997	Last Stand at Saber River	Vern Kidston	Television movie	
1997–1998	Fast Track	Dr. Richard Beckett	23 episodes	
1998	American Buffalo: Spirit of a Nation	The Narrator	Documentary	
1999	Outreach	Dr. Vincent Shaw	Television movie	
1999	Hard Time: Hostage Hotel	Corporal Arlin Flynn	Television movie	
1999	Night Ride Home	Neal Mahler	Television movie	
1999	Sirens	Officer Dan Wexler	Television movie	
1999	A Song from the Heart	Oliver Comstock	Television movie	
2000	Metropolis	Quincy	Television movie	
2000	Enslavement	Pierce Butler	Television movie	
2000	Baby	John Malone	Television movie	
2001	The Diamond of Jeru	John Lacklan	Television movie	
2002	American Experience	The Narrator	Episode: "Public Enemy Number 1"	
2002	Frasier	Carl (voice)	Episode: "Frasier Has Spokane"	
2002	Arliss	Lamar Scott	Episode: "What You See Is What You Get"	
2002	Street Time	Frank Dugan	3 episodes	
2003	Star Trek: Enterprise	Captain A.G. Robinson	Episode: "First Flight"	
2003	Spider-Man: The New Animated Series	Jonah Jameson (voice)	5 episodes	
2003	Monte Walsh	Chester "Chet" Rollins	Television movie	
2003	Coyote Waits	John McGinnis	Television movie	
2003–2004	Wild West Tech	Host	13 episodes	
2004	Deadwood	James Butler "Wild Bill" Hickok	5 episodes	Satellite Award for Best Actor in a Miniseries or Motion Picture Made for Television
2004–2005	Complete Savages	Nick Savage	19 episodes	
2005	Into the West	Captain Richard H. Pratt	Episode: "Casualties of War"	
2006	Where There's a Will	Sheriff Clifford Laws	Television movie	
2007	American Masters	The Narrator	Episode: "Novel Reflections: The American Dream"	
2007	Criminal Minds	Frank Breitkopf	2 episodes	
2007–2009	Dexter	FBI Special Agent Frank Lundy	15 episodes	
2008	Numbers	Carl McGowan	3 episodes	
2008	Crash	Owen	2 episodes	
2009	Law & Order	Martin Garvik	Episode: "Take-Out"	
2009	Dollhouse	Matthew Harding	3 episodes	
2009	Damages	Julian Decker	5 episodes	
2010–2019	The Big Bang Theory	Wyatt	5 episodes	
2012	Missing	Martin	7 episodes	
2014	The Following	Barry	Episode: "Resurrection"	
2014	Raising Hope	Colt Palomino	Episode: "Anniversary Ball"	
2014	NCIS	Mannheim Gold	Episode: "Rock and a Hard Place"	
2014–2015	Fargo	Lou Solverson	11 episodes	
2014–2019	Madam Secretary	President Conrad Dalton	93 episodes	
2015	Mike Tyson Mysteries	Jason B. (voice)	Episode: "Jason B. Sucks"	
2021–2022	Fear the Walking Dead	John Dorie Sr.	7 episodes	
2021–2023	Rugrats	Bob Brine (voice)	2 episodes	
2023	Accused	Billy Carlson	Episode: "Billy's Story"	
2024	Law & Order: Organized Crime	Clay Bonner	3 episodes	
2025	Blue Ridge	Brother Rusty	Episode: "Moving Mountains"	
2026	High Potential	Douglas Newmeyer	Episode: "Under the Rug"	
2026	Imperfect Women	R.L. Hennessy	Recurring role; 4 episodes	

=== Theater ===
Year	Title	Role
1968	Hair	Woof / Claude
1982	Foxfire	Dillard Nations
1991	The Will Rogers Follies	Will Rogers
2006	Dirty Rotten Scoundrels	Lawrence Jameson
2013	Hands on a Hardbody	JD Drew

=== Video games ===
Year	Title	Role	Notes
2012	Hitman: Absolution	Blake Dexter	Voice

== Awards and nominations ==
Year	Award	Category	Nominated work	Result	Ref.
1975	Academy Awards	Best Original Song	"I'm Easy" (from Nashville)	Won	
1987	CableACE Awards	Best Actor in a Theatrical or Dramatic Special	Half a Lifetime	Nominated	
1991	Drama Desk Awards	Outstanding Actor in a Musical	The Will Rogers Follies	Nominated	
2013	Drama Desk Awards	Outstanding Featured Actor in a Musical	Hands on a Hardbody	Nominated	
2002	Edda Awards	Best Actor	Falcons	Nominated	
1998	Golden Boot Awards	Golden Boot		Honored	
2004	Gold Derby TV Awards	Best Drama Guest Actor	Deadwood	Nominated	
1975	Golden Globe Awards	Best Original Song	"I'm Easy" (from Nashville)	Won	
1975	Grammy Awards	Best Album of Best Original Score Written for a Motion Picture or Television Special	Nashville	Nominated	
2002	Great Lakes International Film Festival	Artistic Excellence Award		Honored	
2018	Oldenburg International Film Festival	Tribute		Honored	
2018	Oldenburg International Film Festival	Star of Excellence		Honored	
2004	Online Film & Television Association Awards	Best Guest Actor in a Drama Series	Deadwood	Nominated	
1984	Primetime Emmy Awards	Outstanding Supporting Actor in a Limited Series or a Special	Chiefs	Nominated	
2005	Prism Awards	Best Performance in a Comedy Series	Complete Savages	Nominated	
2007	Prism Awards	Best Performance in a TV-Movie	Our Very Own	Won	
2018	San Diego International Film Festival	Gregory Peck Award		Honored	
2004	Satellite Awards	Best Actor in a Miniseries or Motion Picture Made for Television	Deadwood	Nominated	
1991	Tony Awards	Best Leading Actor in a Musical	The Will Rogers Follies	Nominated	
2013	Tony Awards	Best Featured Actor in a Musical	Hands on a Hardbody	Nominated	
1998	Western Heritage Awards	Television Feature Film	Last Stand at Saber River	Won	
2024	Western Heritage Awards	Hall of Great Western Performers		Honored	
2014	Wine Country Film Festival	Best Actor	Terroir	Won	

== See also ==
- Carradine family
- List of 1970s one-hit wonders in the United States
