= Chiefs (miniseries) =

1983 American television miniseries

- Genre: Drama/police procedural
- Written by: Robert W. Lenski
- Directed by: Jerry London
- Starring: Keith Carradine; Stephen Collins; Brad Davis; Danny Glover; Tess Harper; Charlton Heston; Wayne Rogers; Paul Sorvino; Billy Dee Williams
- Theme music composer: Michael Small
- Country of origin: United States
- No. of episodes: 3

Production
- Producers: Jerry London; Martin Manulis; John E. Quill
- Editors: Eric Albertson; John J. Dumas; Armond Lebowitz
- Running time: 6 hours
- Production company: London Films Inc.

Original release
- Network: CBS
- Release: November 13 – November 16, 1983

Chiefs is a 1983 American television miniseries based upon the novel of the same name by Stuart Woods. It was first broadcast on CBS over three nights in November 1983. It was directed by Jerry London, and stars Charlton Heston, Keith Carradine, Stephen Collins, Danny Glover, Brad Davis, Paul Sorvino, Lane Smith, Paula Kelly, Wayne Rogers, and Billy Dee Williams. It received three Emmy Award nominations and one Eddie Award nomination.

The miniseries is set in the fictional town of Delano, Georgia, loosely modeled after Manchester, Georgia, situated at the base of Pine Mountain, itself based on the Pine Mountain Range overlooking Manchester.

== Plot ==
Three generations of Delano police chiefs—Will Henry Lee, Sonny Butts, and Tyler Watts—investigate a series of murders. In 1924 town patriarch Hugh Holmes, whose character intermittently narrates the story, decides the town has grown large enough to require a jail and a full-time police officer. The town appoints farmer Will Lee its first police chief; despite his lack of law-enforcement experience, Lee becomes known as fair-minded and effective. Lee's farm had employed the Coles, a black family, who regard with trepidation their new and less benevolent employer, Ku Klux Klan member Hoss Spence.

Chief Lee investigates the death of a young boy who fell down a ravine while apparently fleeing a sexual attack. He also discovers that other young male vagrants and hitchhikers have been observed traveling toward Delano but have not been seen leaving the area. He pursues his investigations, unable to obtain the cooperation of Sheriff 'Skeeter' Willis or the police chiefs of neighboring counties. Eventually, Lee discovers that loner "Foxy" Funderburke is responsible for the boys' murders, but Lee is mistakenly shot by delirious former employee Jesse Cole before he can arrest Funderburke. Funderburke hovers unobtrusively in the hospital room while the dying Lee tries to gasp out Funderburke's guilt, but Lee's wife fails to understand. Having killed in a feverish delirium that caused him to believe that Chief Lee was trying to kill his son, Jesse Cole is executed, but not before urging his son, Joshua, to run away.

Free from suspicion, Funderburke continues a decades long spree of sexually motivated murders. Shortly after World War II, violent Army veteran and war hero Sonny Butts is appointed assistant police chief in Delano. When the chief dies of a heart attack, the city council appoints Butts to fill the vacancy. Implicated in a series of depredations culminating in the murder of a black mechanic, Butts is about to have his badge taken away by town father Holmes when Butts figures out Funderburke's guilt. Certain that solving the decades-long mystery will save his job, Butts goes to Funderburke's land, catching him in the act of burying his latest victim. As Butts chortles over his victory, letting down his guard, Funderburke strikes Butts with the shovel, shoots Butts with his own police revolver, and buries his body on the spot, along with his police motorcycle. No one makes the connection between the disappearance of Butts and the long-unsolved murders.

Chief Lee's son, Billy, a young boy at the time of his father's death, comes home from World War II an officer and war hero. The liberal lawyer enters politics, first becoming a state senator, then lieutenant governor, and aspiring to national office. In 1962 black Tyler Watts, a retired, decorated military officer and experienced criminal investigator, takes the bold step of applying for the vacant position of police chief in a Southern town. With the support of Billy Lee and Mayor Holmes, Watts is appointed Delano police chief incurring the disapproval of the all-white council.

Like everyone else, Billy Lee assumes that Watts is a newcomer in town, failing to recognize Watts as his boyhood friend, Joshua Cole, son of the man who shot his father. Joshua fled the town following the shooting and assumed another name. Watts initially encounters resistance from members of his own, all-white force (though most eventually accept him) and from Sheriff Skeeter Willis. Eventually Watts uncovers Funderburke's guilt in the unsolved serial murders. Unable to obtain a local search warrant for Funderburke's farm, Watts and Lee seek the FBI's assistance in the case. One of the FBI agents accompanying Chief Watts trips over the jutting handlebar of Butts's buried police motorcycle.

As the agents begin digging up the dirt, Funderburke goes for his shotgun and wounds Watts in the arm. Funderburke is immediately shot to death, escaping a public reckoning for four decades of murders. The bodies of young boy after young boy are unearthed from the ground surrounding Funderburke's house. Now an acknowledged hero, Watts decides to tell Billy Lee who he really is; Lee, now governor-elect of Georgia, awaits a visit from President Kennedy, on his way back to Washington from Dallas.

== Production and distribution ==
Chiefs premiered on CBS as a six-hour miniseries. The first two hours aired beginning at 8pm November 13, 1983. The second part aired November 15 at 9pm, and the final part aired November 16 at 9pm.

Production filming took place in Chester, South Carolina. In 2014, a celebration of the filming of Chiefs was organized in Chester by Catherine Fleming Bruce in collaboration with local organizations. Among the presenters was author Stuart Woods. The Chester newspaper reprinted coverage of Woods' visit to the city on the occasion of his death in 2022.

== Reception ==
John J. O'Connor of The New York Times said Chiefs was "an ambitious yet flawed project that overall, works powerfully well." Director London has "a keen sense of what the sweeping saga entails, though there are weaknesses." He criticized the ending of the miniseries for not following the novel's ending, in which Holmes realizes that, for all the decades of work he did to make Delano a decent place, it will now always be remembered as the site of a perverted series of murders; the film, by contrast, ends with Lee and Watts recognizing each other and embracing in an upbeat moment of friendship. Nevertheless, he noted that the performances of Davis (Sonny Butts), Sorvino (Skeeter), Carradine (Foxy Funderburke), and Glover (Marshall Peters) were outstanding.

The miniseries was nominated for three Emmy Awards:

- "Outstanding Art Direction for a Limited Series or a Special" – production designer Charles C. Bennett and Set designer Victor Kempster (for Part 2)
- "Outstanding Limited Series" – executive producer Martin Manulis, supervising producer Jerry London, and producer John E. Quill
- "Outstanding Supporting Actor in a Limited Series or a Special" – Keith Carradine

It was nominated for an Eddie Award in the "Best Edited Episode from a Television Mini-Series" for Eric Albertson, John J. Dumas, and Armond Lebowitz.

Its success resulted in the paperback version of the novel, Chiefs, entering the New York Times Best Seller list.

== Cast ==
- Charlton Heston as Hugh Holmes
- Keith Carradine as "Foxy" Funderburke
- Wayne Rogers as Will Henry Lee
- Stephen Collins as Billy Lee
- Brad Davis as Sonny Butts
- Billy Dee Williams as Tyler Watts / Joshua Cole
- Paul Sorvino as Sheriff Skeeter Willis
- Danny Glover - Marshall Peters
- Tess Harper as Carrie Lee
- Victoria Tennant as Trish Lee
- John Goodman as Newt "Tub" Murray
- Stuart Woods as Pope
- Lane Smith as Hoss Spence
- Leon Rippy as Tommy Allen
