= Ellis Island (miniseries) =

Television miniseries

- VHS cover
- Based on: Ellis Island by Fred Mustard Stewart
- Written by: Fred M. Stewart; Christopher Newman
- Directed by: Jerry London
- Starring: Peter Riegert; Gregory Paul Martin; Alice Krige; Judi Bowker; Faye Dunaway; Richard Burton; Kate Burton; Ann Jillian; Milo O'Shea; Ben Vereen; Melba Moore; Emma Samms; Stubby Kaye; Cherie Lunghi; Michael Byrne; Liam Neeson
- Theme music composer: John Addison
- Country of origin: United States
- No. of episodes: 3

Production
- Producer: Nick Gillott
- Editors: John J. Dumas; Bernard Gribble
- Running time: 420 minutes
- Production companies: Vista Films Ltd. Telepictures Productions

Original release
- Network: CBS
- Release: November 11 – November 14, 1984

Ellis Island is a television miniseries, broadcast in three parts in 1984 on the CBS television network. The screenplay was co-written by Fred Mustard Stewart, adapted from his 1983 novel of the same title.

The series tells the story of four immigrants to America, played by Peter Riegert as a Russian Jew, Gregory Paul Martin as a working-class Italian, and Alice Krige and Judi Bowker as two Irish sisters. It starts in 1907 as they manage to leave Europe and travel by boat to Ellis Island, hoping for a better life, and follows their individual struggles, hopes, and successes through the end of 1916, as they try to achieve the American Dream. Ellis Island highlights a number of historic events in Europe and the U.S. throughout the time period, and some of the characters involved are based on real persons, such as Irving Berlin.

The series was the final screen appearance of Richard Burton. It was dedicated to his memory, and the cast includes his daughter Kate Burton as his character's daughter. Faye Dunaway won a Golden Globe award for her role in the miniseries, and Ben Vereen was nominated for his role.

Originally seven hours long and telecast in three parts on three consecutive nights in November 1984, Ellis Island was shortened to six hours and re-telecast in three parts in the summer of 1986, to celebrate the Statue of Liberty Centennial.

The miniseries features six Irving Berlin–style songs, composed by John Addison, with lyrics by Douglas Brayfield and Fred Mustard Stewart.

== Plot ==
=== Part 1 ===
1907, Russia: Jacob Rubinstein is the son of a rabbi. His father is killed and his village burned during a pogrom; Jacob is shot in the leg, and he manages to unhorse a Cossack, grab his gun and kill him, and use his horse to flee.

In Italy, Marco Santorelli is the handsome gardener for Maud Charteris, a famous American actress. She helps him learn English to advance himself, but also in an attempt to seduce him. She leaves for London to perform in a new play, and Marco declines to accompany her. He tells his family he has decided to move to America.

At the Hamburg docks trying to flee Europe, Jacob lacks the full fare to New York. He passes a dance hall and hears ragtime music being played by black American pianist Roscoe Haines, who allows Jacob to attempt to imitate him, which he does well from his classical training. Roscoe passes a hat to raise Jacob's boat fare, and tells him to look up Abe Shulman's music publishing company in New York for a job.

In Ireland, chambermaid Bridget O'Donnell is sleeping with the young English Earl of Wexford in his palatial estate. She persuades him to take a night stroll, and Kevin Murray, her compatriot Fenian, kidnaps him. Kevin sends her off to America to avoid arrest, and her sister Georgiana accompanies her; Bridget begs him not to harm the earl.

Marco and Jacob meet on the ship to New York, and become good friends. They run into the Irish sisters, and Marco dances with the beautiful Georgiana.

At Ellis Island, the immigrants pass through U.S. Immigration and undergo a physical examination. Georgiana is sent to Dr. Travers, who tells her she has trachoma, which untreated can lead to blindness, and that she must return to Ireland. Bridget argues vociferously with the doctor, and while Georgiana is in detention gets her American uncle Casey O'Donnell to fix the situation by paying someone off with $200. Bridget sees in the newspaper that the Fenians have murdered the Earl of Wexford.

Marco and Jacob move into a seedy tenement apartment with other immigrants. Abe Shulman tries to throw Jacob out when he comes by the music publishing company looking for a job, but Jacob presses past him and starts to play ragtime on the piano. Shulman sends him to his cousin who owns the Coney Island Music Hall, but he is only hired as a waiter.

The O'Donnell sisters move in with their uncle Casey, who owns a delivery company. Georgiana is told by a specialist that nothing can be done at this point to save her eyesight.

By 1909, Marco is unhappy working construction, and borrows $50 from a loan shark to buy a van so he can start his own delivery business. But when he speeds down a road to celebrate, the van crashes and burns. Tortured by the loan shark and given one week to pay $100, Marco sees a sign that Maud is in town performing the new play; he visits her backstage and they begin an affair for which Maud compensates him financially. Marco and Jacob move into a nice apartment, and Marco revives his delivery business.

Jacob changes his name to Jake Rubin, and at work meets Al Jolson, who listens to one of his songs and presses Abe Shulman to hire him as a song plugger. He attempts to plug a song to Nellie Byfield, who sings at a gentlemen's club.

Bridget runs into the widower Dr. Travers, who offers her a job as his secretary and assistant at Ellis Island. Her devotion to the job and to the immigrants sparks a romance, and they marry.

Senator Phipps Ogden, a widower who has been seeing Maud, visits her unannounced and accuses her of having an Italian lover, but she throws him off the scent.

Roscoe returns to New York and performs in a saloon. Shulman won't publish Jake's songs, so Roscoe has his black friend Flora Mitchum sing one of them in her nightclub act.

Georgiana, now blind, overhears Marco's voice during one of his delivery rounds. He takes her out on a movie date and narrates the plot to her.

=== Part 2 ===
Jake is a successful songwriter, and has his first hit song. Nellie woos Jake, who writes her a song. At a party, Nellie's uppercrust admirer tries to humiliate Jake, who punches him. Jake helps Nellie get an in with Florenz Ziegfeld and become a star of the Ziegfeld Follies.

Flora and Roscoe move to Paris to escape the anti-black employment discrimination they face in the U.S.

Maud marries Senator Phipps Ogden for financial security. She advises Marco to go to school, and offers to fund it.

Marco and Georgiana have another movie date, and he proposes to her. Casey finds out about Marco's prior liaison with Maud, and frames Marco for theft, causing him to be locked up in Ellis Island facing immediate deportation. With the help of a fellow inmate, he escapes from his holding cell and swims to the New Jersey shore, and Jake finds him a hiding place in Newark.

Georgiana finds out Casey framed Marco, and moves out of his house and in with Bridget and Dr. Travers. From a newspaper report, Bridget finds out Marco is probably still alive, but does not tell Georgiana.

In 1910, Marco comes out of hiding to ask Maud, now living in the Ogden estate on Long Island, to fund his education; he attends a boarding school called Bryant Academy and vows to stay away from Georgiana until he is educated and prosperous and safe. Ogden fixes things so that Casey will no longer threaten Marco.

Jake and Nellie marry, but Nellie does not want children. She gives birth to a girl, who is slightly brain-damaged during labor. Nellie neglects the child, even when the child is sick, in favor of stardom and affairs with her co-stars. She refuses to have any more children, and tells Jake she married him only for what he could do for her.

Georgiana starts writing screenplays, which begin to be produced by Jesse Lasky.

Marco meets Ogden's plain-looking and socialist-leaning daughter, Vanessa, and after spending Christmas vacation with the Ogdens, with Maud's encouragement he seduces her. She gets pregnant from that night, and he is forced to marry her, even though he doesn't love her and she is turned off by sex. Bridget sees the wedding announcement in the newspaper.

While at work at Ellis Island, Bridget notices Kevin Murray, who begins to blackmail her for money and favors. In 1914, Bridget has a son, and later another child. Her husband leaves Ellis Island to start a regular medical practice.

Roscoe and Flora return to America, hoping to open a club.

=== Part 3 ===
In 1916, Marco and Vanessa's son Mark is five years old. Marco announces that he is running for the New York State Senate, opposing the Irish candidate controlled by Casey O'Donnell's corrupt cronies. Ogden supports this because Casey is a thorn in his own political side as well.

Vanessa develops an alcohol problem. She makes a spectacle of herself at a large party which is also an important political event for Marco, and she is taken to a distant psychiatric sanatorium.

Jake starts an affair with his daughter's ballet teacher, Violet Weiler. Her mother disapproves of the affair and of Jake. Even though Nellie knows he has cheated, she refuses to grant a divorce. Violet tells her ballet instructor Madame Levitska, who was the mistress of Tsar Nicholas II of Russia, that she is not cut out to be a mistress, even though she and Jake cannot give each other up.

Jake writes a Broadway musical for Flora to star in, but no one will finance a Broadway production with a black lead, so he risks all of his own money to produce it. The show is an overwhelming success, so when Lasky expresses interest in investing, Jake offers to sell him a 50% interest if Lasky will give Nellie a three-film contract when he opens his planned Hollywood production company in California.

Jake and Nellie's daughter dies of influenza. Nellie gets a telegram telling her that she has been given a contract to perform in Hollywood, and announces she is leaving Jake and has signed the divorce papers. Jake marries Violet, which also pleases Mrs. Weiler.

Georgiana, who has been told by Bridget about Marco's marriage, is furious; she feels betrayed and thought that he was in Italy. One night while in her bed when Dr. Travers is out, she hears her sister crying out; she goes downstairs, grabs a pair of long shears and stabs and kills Kevin, who is trying to rape Bridget. Dr. Travers reacts very badly to the news that Bridget had kept her activities in Ireland from him, and thereafter hardly speaks to her. Georgiana convinces him to give her another chance.

While she is in the sanatorium, Vanessa is befriended by a rebellious artist and gallery owner named Una Marbury. They stay friends when they are discharged, and live together as a lesbian couple in an undisclosed location. Ogden hires a private detective to find Vanessa, and offers Una $20,000 to never see his daughter again. When Vanessa discovers that Una has accepted the offer, she shoots Una and then herself.

Casey's men set fire to Marco's Manhattan apartment campaign headquarters while he is asleep there. Marco jumps from his window to escape; Georgiana visits him in hospital and they reconcile and plan to marry. Georgiana, Bridget, and Casey's wife confront Casey over the arson, and confiscate incriminatory files from his office which they threaten to release if he takes further action against Marco.

Ogden asks Marco to withdraw from the election following Vanessa's suicide. Georgiana convinces him to stay in the race, even though Odgen will withdraw all financial support. Marco and his son move out of the Ogden estate.

Marco wins the election, becoming the first Ellis Island immigrant to be elected to the state senate. Celebrating his victory with the crowd gathered, including Jake and Violet, Marco leads the audience in a sing-along of "America the Beautiful".

The series ends by revealing that more than 12 million immigrants passed through Ellis Island, which remained opened until 1954, and that two out of five Americans alive in 1984 are descendants of an Ellis Island immigrant.

== Cast ==
- Peter Riegert as Jacob Rubinstein / Jake Rubin, a Russian Jew
- Gregory Paul Martin as Marco Santorelli, a working-class Italian
- Alice Krige as Bridget O'Donnell, an Irish chambermaid who secretly supports Irish independence from Britain
- Judi Bowker as Georgiana "Georgie" O'Donnell, Bridget's gentle, beautiful sister
- Milo O'Shea as Casey O'Donnell, an influential Irish-American who owns a delivery company
- Lila Kaye as Kate O'Donnell, Casey's wife
- Faye Dunaway as Maud Charteris, a famous American actress
- Richard Burton as Senator Phipps Ogden, a wealthy aging widower
- Kate Burton as Vanessa Ogden, Ogden's socialist-leaning daughter who is an amateur sculptor and artist
- Ann Jillian as Nellie Byfield, an ambitious solo singer who performs in a gentlemen's club
- Stubby Kaye as Abe Shulman, a music publisher
- Cherie Lunghi as Una Marbury, an eccentric and rebellious art gallery owner
- Ben Vereen as Roscoe Haines, a black American pianist
- Melba Moore as Flora Mitchum, a black American club singer
- Emma Samms as Violet Weiler, a ballet teacher who teaches young girls
- Claire Bloom as Rebecca Weiler, Violet's well-to-do mother
- Joan Greenwood as Madame Levitska, a retired Russian ballerina and the owner of the ballet school Violet teaches at
- Michael Byrne as Dr. Carl Travers, a dedicated physician at the Ellis Island U.S. Immigration service
- Liam Neeson as Kevin Murray, an Irish Fenian who opposes British rule

== Production ==
The miniseries was filmed in England and Italy, rather than in the United States. Interiors were done at Shepperton Studios near London.

Richard Burton died in August 1984, two weeks after filming his scenes.

== Reception ==
Faye Dunaway beat five other actresses, winning the Golden Globe Award for Best Performance by an Actress in a Supporting Role in a Series, Mini-Series or Motion Picture Made for TV. Ben Vereen received a nomination in the equivalent male category.

Costume designer Barbara Lane received the Emmy Award for Outstanding Costume Design for a Limited Series or a Special. At the Emmy Awards the series itself received a nomination, as did actors Richard Burton and Ann Jillian, and sound mixer Tony Dawe.
