= List of Empty Nest episodes =

This is a list of episodes for the American television sitcom Empty Nest, a spinoff of The Golden Girls that originally aired on NBC from October 8, 1988, to June 17, 1995. Over the series run, 170 original episodes aired.

During its run, Empty Nest had two crossover stories with The Golden Girls and Nurses. The episode "Windy" continues an event depicting a hurricane that begins on the hour-long Golden Girls episode "The Monkey Show" and concludes on the Nurses episode "Begone with the Wind". The episode "Dr. Weston and Mr. Hyde" continues an event depicting a full moon that begins on the hour-long Golden Girls episode "A Midwinter Night's Dream" and concludes on the Nurses episode "Moon Over Miami".

== Series overview ==
Seasons of Empty Nest
| Season | Episodes | Originally released | | Rank | Rating |
| Season | Episodes | First released | Last released | Rank | Rating |
|---|---|---|---|---|---|
| 1 | 22 | October 8, 1988 | April 1, 1989 | 9 | 19.2 |
| 2 | 24 | September 30, 1989 | April 28, 1990 | 9 | 18.9 |
| 3 | 24 | September 22, 1990 | May 11, 1991 | 7 | 16.7 |
| 4 | 24 | September 21, 1991 | May 2, 1992 | 23 | 14.3 |
| 5 | 26 | September 19, 1992 | May 22, 1993 | 48 | 10.8 |
| 6 | 26 | September 25, 1993 | May 21, 1994 | 66 | 9.8 |
| 7 | 24 | September 24, 1994 | June 17, 1995 | 118 | 6.9 |

== Episodes ==
=== Season 1 (1988–89) ===
| No. overall | No. in season | Title | Directed by | Written by | Original release date | Prod. code | U.S. viewers (millions) |
|---|---|---|---|---|---|---|---|
| 1 | 1 | "Pilot" | Jay Sandrich | Susan Harris | October 8, 1988 | 001 | 29.3 |
Harry is proposed to eighteen months after the death of his wife. Special Guest Stars: Grace Zabriskie as Eva Barrett; Guest stars: Victor DiMattia as Rocco Fogal, Robin Pearson Rose as Mrs. Fogal
| 2 | 2 | "The Check Isn't in the Mail" | Hal Cooper | Gary Jacobs | October 22, 1988 | 004 | 23.9 |
Carol gets all dolled up for a date with her contemptible ex-husband. Harry thinks Dreyfuss may be sick. Special Guest Stars: Ann Ryerson as Mrs. Bridges, Leo Geter as Dr. Ross, Adrian Zmed as Gary, Craig Richard Nelson as Waiter
| 3 | 3 | "Barbara Gets Shot" | Hal Cooper | Don Reo | October 29, 1988 | 003 | 26.9 |
Harry tries to get Barbara to give up her police career after she is shot. Guest stars: Richard Fancy as Lieutenant, Dean Fortunato as Cop #1, David Correia as Cop #2, Lindsay Parker as Jennifer
| 4 | 4 | "Fatal Attraction" | Hal Cooper | Susan Harris | November 5, 1988 | 007 | 32.5 |
Neighbor Blanche thinks she is in love with Harry and comes on strong when showing her affection. An old friend of the family dies after an illness. Carol decides to move in and take care of her father. Special Guest Star: Rue McClanahan as Blanche Devereaux This episode concludes a crossover with The Golden Girls that begins on "Yokel Hero".
| 5 | 5 | "Father of the Bride" | Hal Cooper | Susan Harris | November 12, 1988 | 002 | 28.8 |
Harry is ecstatic when Barbara accepts her surgeon boyfriend's marriage proposal, but she has second thoughts the night before the wedding. Guest stars: Sam McMurray as Brent
| 6 | 6 | "Harry's Vacation" | Hal Cooper | Susan Beavers | November 19, 1988 | 005 | 30.3 |
Harry thinks he has become a burden on Carol and Barbara when they send him away on a vacation, despite his objections. Guest stars: Abdul Salaam el Razzac as Piano Player, Joe Hart as Man, Tommy Hinkley as Bartender, Lela Ivey as Debbie, Marcia Rodd as Woman
| 7 | 7 | "Tinker to Evers to Tucson" | Hal Cooper | David Tyron King | November 26, 1988 | 008 | 33.1 |
When husband Nick is traded to a baseball team in Arizona, Laverne is forced to quit. A sick Charley camps out on Harry's couch. Guest stars: Brandon Adams as Peter, Jason Bernard as Mr. Noack, Eva Charney as Michelle
| 8 | 8 | "What's a Father to Do?" | Hal Cooper | Rod Parker | December 3, 1988 | 009 | 28.6 |
Harry makes plans to accompany Carol to see her photographs displayed in an art gallery, and also to attend a ceremony honoring Barbara with a gold medal of valor. The problem is, both events are on the same day. Guest stars: Grace Albertson as Woman, Raye Birk as Albert, Xavier García as Esteban, Tim Haldeman as Waiter
| 9 | 9 | "Harry's Friend" | Hal Cooper | Arnie Kogen | December 10, 1988 | 010 | 29.2 |
Harry is not too happy when Carol begins dating his old friend. Special Guest Stars: Edan Gross as Jeffrey Millstein, Donnelly Rhodes as Leonard
| 10 | 10 | "Libby's Gift" | Hal Cooper | David Sacks & Rob LaZebnik | December 17, 1988 | 006 | 27.6 |
An organ that Libby ordered before dying finally arrives at the house and Harry becomes determined to learn to play it in time for his and Libby's anniversary. Barbara and Carol worry that he is going too far. A patient asks Harry for birth control. Special Guest Star: Estelle Getty as Sophia Petrillo; Guest stars: William Gallo as Delivery Man, Katie V. O'Neill as Katie Taylor
| 11 | 11 | "The First Time, Again" | Hal Cooper | Gary Jacobs | January 7, 1989 | 011 | 34.1 |
Harry is encouraged to spend a weekend alone with his girlfriend. Jeffrey Millstein's imagination runs wild after he sees a scary movie. Guest stars: Barbara Babcock as Paula Conroy, Edan Gross as Jeffrey Millstein, Jarrett Lennon as Little Boy, Dierk Torsek as Mr. Millstein
| 12 | 12 | "Full Nest" | Hal Cooper | Susan Beavers | January 14, 1989 | 012 | 31.8 |
Financial trouble forces Barbara to move back in with Harry but it's not all fun and games. A lonely Carol soon decides to move in as well. Special Guest Star: Brad Hall as Chuck
| 13 | 13 | "Here's a Howdy-Do" | Hal Cooper | Kim Hill | January 28, 1989 | 014 | 28.2 |
Harry does not understand why no one likes his new girlfriend, but soon realizes they were right. When the relationship ends, Carol, who actually liked the lady, questions her own instincts. Guest stars: Susan Anspach as Dr. Diane Hardy, Judith-Marie Bergan as Janet, Nike Doukas as Liz, Whitby Hertford as Alec, Charles Levin as Stan
| 14 | 14 | "Strange Bedfellows" | Hal Cooper | David Tyron King | February 4, 1989 | 015 | 31.4 |
Carol falls in love with a South American freedom fighter and announces she's going away with him. Jeffrey Millstein falls in love with Laverne. Special Guest Star: Betty White as Rose Nylund; Guest stars: Edan Gross as Jeffrey Millstein, Franc Luz as Eric, Tom Nibley as Waiter
| 15 | 15 | "Tears of a Clown" | Hal Cooper | Marie Therese Squerciati | February 6, 1989 | 013 | 29.1 |
Carol becomes public relations director of the hospital and causes a multi-million dollar lawsuit when she reveals the mental problems of local celebrity Poko the Clown at a press conference. Charley convinces Barbara to pose as his fiancee to get a promotion. Special Guest Star: Paul Sand as Poko the Clown; Guest stars: Ian Abercrombie as Captain Burke, Nancy Cartwright as Ann, Nicky Rose as Little Girl
| 16 | 16 | "Blame It on the Moon" | Hal Cooper | Gary Jacobs | February 11, 1989 | 016 | 31.2 |
The Westons laugh when Charley says the full moon will bring love, but then realize he could be right. A rude doctor catches Harry's eye. Carol finds romance when a man returns run-away Dreyfuss (who in turn finds love in the man's female dog). A stake-out leads Barbara into the arms of a high-school boyfriend. Guest stars: Ray Buktenica as Alan, Katherine Cannon as Dr. Kenney, Greg Kean Williams as Brad
| 17 | 17 | "Dumped" | Hal Cooper | Susan Beavers | February 18, 1989 | 017 | 30.9 |
Barbara falls in love with neighbor, Dorothy's nephew, but is surprisingly not fazed when he dumps her. Dorothy and Harry have an argument when Dorothy blames Barbara for the breakup. Special Guest Star: Bea Arthur as Dorothy Zbornak; Guest stars: John Scott Clough as Jim, Cynthia Steele as Mother #1, Mary Garripoli as Mother #2
| 18 | 18 | "The More Things Change" | John Bowab | David Sacks & Rob LaZebnik | February 25, 1989 | 018 | 30.3 |
The hospital's new owner forces Harry to move his practice after 25 years in the same office. Meanwhile, Carol tries to amend the past after reading Emily's old diary and Charley tries out a new look. Guest stars: Jane Galloway as Lucy, Gregory Itzin as Frank, Tony Longo as Stan, James Staley as Ted, Linda Thorson as Janice Brittle
| 19 | 19 | "Man of the Year" | Hal Cooper | Mady Julian | March 4, 1989 | 019 | 30.3 |
When Harry receives a Man of the Year award, his estranged father comes to town for the ceremony. Harry gets upset when he learns that his father did not think he could make it as a doctor. Carol overhears the conversation and thinks her grandfather is dying. Special Guest Star: Harold Gould as Dr. Stanfield Weston; Guest stars: Marla Adams as Elna, William Bogert as Doctor #1, Milt Oberman as Doctor #2, Peter Hobbs as Dr. Garrison
| 20 | 20 | "Cyrano de Weston" | Hal Cooper | Arnie Kogen | March 18, 1989 | 020 | 27.8 |
Harry gives Charley advice on how to impress a new girlfriend, who turns out to be the same lady Harry is seeing. When a relative dies and leaves Barbara and Emily money, Carol is anxious to see what she will be getting, and she is not too thrilled when it arrives. Guest stars: Christine Belford as Fran, Ed Hooks as Mailman, Marsha Clark as Voice of Aunt Cecilia
| 21 | 21 | "My Sister, My Friend" | Steve Zuckerman | Harold Kimmel | March 25, 1989 | 021 | 29.6 |
Harry promises to take Carol and Barbara with him to Paris if the two can go one month without fighting. Charley wins a greyhound in a card game. Guest stars: Jake Jundef, as Boy, Eva Charney as Miss Clark, Francis Guinan as Dr. Mitchel
| 22 | 22 | "A Life in the Day" | Hal Cooper | David Tyron King & Rob LaZebnik & David Sacks | April 1, 1989 | 022 | 28.3 |
Harry sees six patients: a week-old baby, a five-year-old whose father denies the boy's onset diabetes; a seven-year-old curious about sex; an eleven-year-old having the cast removed from his arm; a belligerent 14-year-old who uses drugs; and an 18-year-old picking up his medical records before going away to college. The end of the episode reveals that all of these have been the same patient at different ages. Guest stars: Billy O'Sullivan as Billy at 5, Aeryk Egan as Billy at 11, Stephen Dorff as Billy at 14, Matthew Perry as Billy at 18, Debra Engle as Mrs. Sexton, Richard Kind as Elton Sexton

=== Season 2 (1989–90) ===
| No. overall | No. in season | Title | Directed by | Written by | Original release date | Prod. code | U.S. viewers (millions) |
|---|---|---|---|---|---|---|---|
| 23 | 1 | "Settling" | Steve Zuckerman | Susan Beavers | September 30, 1989 | 024 | 32.6 |
Carol's date has trouble with intimacy, while Laverne would not accept a raise. Guest Stars: Tom Isbell as Dan, Craig Stark as Jack
| 24 | 2 | "Harry Snubs Laverne" | Steve Zuckerman | Pat Dougherty | October 14, 1989 | 027 | 26.7 |
Laverne has a serious problem with something Dr. Harry Watson has done; two young patients disagree with Harry's methods for treating their lovesickness; Charley make a strange request to be buried in the Weston family's plot. Guest stars: Dee Dee Rescher as Mrs. Swenson, Ariana Richards as Phoebe Swenson, Stuart Nisbet as the M.C.
| 25 | 3 | "On the Interpretation of Dreams" | Steve Zuckerman | Gary Jacobs | October 21, 1989 | 023 | 29.4 |
Harry suffers from a strange recurring dream, the girls spend the night with him trying to decipher the dream and end up at an all-night diner. Guest stars: Ralph Seymour as Jimmy
| 26 | 4 | "Between a Cop and a Hard Place" | Steve Zuckerman | Neil Alan Levy | October 28, 1989 | 029 | 27.3 |
Barbara's partner, who happens to be dating her sister Carol, is dating more than one woman. Guest stars: Michael Ray Bower as Josh, Jon Lindstrom as Joe, R. J. Williams as Jimmy
| 27 | 5 | "Just You and My Kid" | Steve Zuckerman | David Tyron King | November 4, 1989 | 025 | 29.5 |
A beautiful ex- patient asks Harry to father her child. Guest stars: Justin Burnette as Eddie, Marsha Clark as Voice of Mitzi the Talking Doll, Robin Riker as Janet Majors, Nicky Rose as Amanda Note: The off-screen character that was mentioned by Laverne, Dr. Everett Scott, and the character Janet Majors could be a possible reference to the "Rocky Horror Picture Show". Dr. Everett Scott & Janet are both characters in the movie; however, in this episode of Empty Nest, Janet has the last name of her "Rocky Horror" fiancee Brad Majors.
| 28 | 6 | "Rambo of Neiman Marcus" | Steve Zuckerman | Arnie Kogen | November 11, 1989 | 026 | 30.2 |
Barbara tries to improve her police work after Carol catches an armed robber, while Rose Nylund accidentally hits Harry's car and offers to pay for the damages. Special guest star: Betty White as Rose Nylund; Guest stars: Luis Ávalos as Lieutenant Valdez, Jordan Brady as Delivery Boy
| 29 | 7 | "You Are 16 Going on 17 and I'm Not" | Steve Zuckerman | Susan Beavers | November 18, 1989 | 030 | 31.3 |
Carol tutors a boy she used to take care of, only to find out he is drop dead gorgeous. Laverne misses her friends birthday due to being overloaded at the office. Guest stars: Brian Bloom as Jimmy, Jana Arnold as Lurlene
| 30 | 8 | "The R.N. Who Came to Dinner" | Steve Zuckerman | David Tyron King | November 25, 1989 | 031 | 30.8 |
Laverne stays with Harry after she and her husband have a fight, which drives the family crazy. Harry agrees to go to a dance with a patient. Guest stars: Mayim Bialik as Laurie Kincaid, Chris Demetral as Billy, Margaret Willock as Mrs. Kincaid
| 31 | 9 | "Green Eggs and Harry" | Steve Zuckerman | Rob LaZebnik & David Sacks | December 2, 1989 | 034 | 28.3 |
Harry is asked to write a Children's book and enlists Carol's help. Charley is attracted to a juror while doing jury duty. Guest stars: Mitchell Allen as Billy, Todd Cameron Brown as Terrence, G. F. Smith as Mr. Harrison
| 32 | 10 | "Overdue for a Job" | Steve Zuckerman | Rob LaZebnik & David Sacks | December 9, 1989 | 028 | 29.0 |
Carol finds a job at the Library, where she gets more than she bargains for. Charley joins a big buddy program. Meanwhile Barbara gets Dreyfuss to learn how to play Frisbee. Guest stars: Alan Rosenberg as Professor Brooks, Mary Catherine Wright as Ms. Bingham, Catherine Parks as Mrs. Harte, Garette Ratliff as Demetrie
| 33 | 11 | "A Christmas Story" | Steve Zuckerman | Arnie Kogen | December 16, 1989 | 033 | 29.3 |
As Harry and the girls plan for their annual holiday tradition of skiing at the lodge tragedy strikes as Dreyfuss runs away. Meanwhile Laverne will not accept a gift from Harry. Guest stars: Ronnie Schell as Mr. Ritter
| 34 | 12 | "Change of Heart" | Andy Cadiff | Susan Beavers | January 6, 1990 | 037 | 31.9 |
Harry who is dreadfully overworked has an angina attack. Everyone urges him to slow down and rest but he refuses. Guest stars: Ray Abruzzo as Dr. Leonard, Annie Barker as Jody, Audree Chapman as Nurse, Bill Cort as Dr. Bonham
| 35 | 13 | "Harry's Choice" | Steve Zuckerman | Mitchell Hurwitz | January 13, 1990 | 038 | 30.1 |
Barbara quits the police force which trills Harry, but is worried that he may have pushed her into a new job. Meanwhile Carol is saving up desperately trying to pay for Harry's birthday present. Guest stars: Kathleen Noone as Cookie
| 36 | 14 | "Complainin' in the Rain" | Steve Zuckerman | Harold Kimmel | January 27, 1990 | 039 | 31.2 |
Barbara is tired of hearing Carol complain, so she convinces her to go along on a spontaneous adventure. Meanwhile Harry and Laverne recall the day she was hired. Guest stars: Christopher Rich as John, Jack Blessing as Evan Phillips, William Phipps as Otto
| 37 | 15 | "M.D., P.O.V." | Steve Zuckerman | David Sacks & Rob LaZebnik & David Tyron King | February 3, 1990 | 036 | 29.5 |
As a reporter is trying to do a report on Harry, he is doing everything to avoid it. A young patient is on the verge of dying and no one can figure out what the problem is. Guest stars: Matthew Brooks as Roy, Debra Engle as Alexandra Hudson, Beth Grant as Helen
| 38 | 16 | "Everything But Love" | Steve Zuckerman | Pat Dougherty | February 10, 1990 | 032 | 27.9 |
Charley starts to date Harry's niece who is staying at the Weston's house while in town. Laverne gets into an argument with her best friend over losing her "country" way of living. Guest stars: Jana Arnold as Lurlene, Wayne C. Dvorak as Waiter, Cynthia Stevenson as Amy, Adam Wylie as Boy
| 39 | 17 | "Timing" | Steve Zuckerman | Gary Jacobs | February 12, 1990 | 035 | 20.3 |
Harry now feeling a little more confident about himself feels ready to start dating again and he might just rekindle an old romance. Guest stars: Barbara Babcock as Paula Conroy, Michael Bower as Josh, John Mansfield as Tom
| 40 | 18 | "It Happened Two Nights, Four Costume Changes" | Steve Zuckerman | David Tyron King | February 17, 1990 | 040 | 30.0 |
When Laverne is told that her boyfriend was having an affair, she tells him that she is dating Harry. Carol and Barbara try to figure out the best way to deal with a mouse in the house. Guest stars: Christopher McDonald as Nick Todd, Ron Orbach as Waiter, Kevin Scannell as Steve Marlowe
| 41 | 19 | "Love Is Blind" | Steve Zuckerman | Arnie Kogen | February 24, 1990 | 041 | 31.5 |
Carol is dating a blind man who is rude and obnoxious, but her main concern is that the man has a disability and is not paying attention to anything else about him. Guest stars: Edan Gross as Jeffrey Millstein, Stan Roth as Waiter, Michael Sabatino as Alan
| 42 | 20 | "Goodbye, Mr. Dietz" | Steve Zuckerman | Toni Perling | March 3, 1990 | 042 | 29.8 |
Harry and the girls return home to find Charley having a party at the house. Harry bans him from ever coming back to the place and moves away. Guest stars:Jim Doughan as Man at Party
| 43 | 21 | "Lessons" | Steve Zuckerman | Susan Beavers | March 10, 1990 | 043 | 25.3 |
Barbara gets a crush on her while she is working undercover at a high school. Charley takes up playing golf. Harry tries to teach Dreyfuss to fetch the morning paper. Guest stars: Diana Barrows as Student #1, Christian Hoff as Student #2, Riff Hutton as Cop, Katherine James as Teacher
| 44 | 22 | "Take My Mom, Please" | Doug Smart | Harold Kimmel & David Tyron King & Rob LaZebnik and David Sacks | March 24, 1990 | 044 | 28.9 |
After hiring a maid, Carol and Barbara realize the family silver is missing. Meanwhile a young patient tries to set Harry up on a date with her mother. Guest stars: Fran Ryan as Mrs. Kramer, Jennifer Salt as Linda Brody, Liz Sheridan as Elspeth, Hayley Tyrie as Erica Brody
| 45 | 23 | "Did You Ever See a Dream Dying?" | Steve Zuckerman | Pat Dougherty | April 14, 1990 | 045 | 26.2 |
Nick gets help from Harry to buy a bar. Harry and the girls find a lost dog who does a lot of damage, but Dreyfuss gets the blame. Guest stars: Al Berry as Customer, Elizabeth Lambert as Merilee, Christopher McDonald as Nick Todd, Bunny Summers as Nana, David Jay Willis as Joey's Owner
| 46 | 24 | "Still Growing After All These Years" | Steve Zuckerman | Gary Jacobs | April 28, 1990 | 046 | 23.4 |
Harry goes on a blind date with a lady who seems to be his perfect mate, though as he learns more about her, he discovers that something is amiss. Charlie is ready for a career change and finds that it's not as easy as he thought. Guest stars: Edan Gross as Jeffrey Millstein, Freddie Dawson as Waiter, Lindsay Parker as Girl, Pat Crowley as Claire

=== Season 3 (1990–91) ===
| No. overall | No. in season | Title | Directed by | Written by | Original release date | Prod. code | U.S. viewers (millions) |
|---|---|---|---|---|---|---|---|
| 47 | 1 | "A Flaw is Born" | Steve Zuckerman | Susan Beavers | September 22, 1990 | 047 | 27.7 |
Harry is dating a world famous brain surgeon and he is a little apprehensive about dating someone so successful. Carol and Barbara plot revenge on a man that never called and promised he would. Guest stars: Mitchell Allen as Boy, Tim Dunigan as John Taylor, Stanley Kamel as Monsieur Gerard, Charles Stransky as Professor, Brynn Thayer as Dr. Lydia Gant
| 48 | 2 | "Harry's Excellent Adventure" | Steve Zuckerman | Arnie Kogen | September 29, 1990 | 050 | 25.8 |
Harry is feeling that he is living his life for everyone else, but that he never has time for himself. When his globe trotting friend unexpectedly shows up, Harry's feelings are confirmed. So, on a whim, Harry jets off to Pamplona with his buddy to run with the bulls. It's only then that Harry sees the truth behind his life, and his pal's. Guest stars: Earl Boen as Lou, Billy Cohen as Stevie, Earl Holliman as Mike Bradovitch, Robert Lesser as Russell, Debi A. Monahan as Gina, Fred Sadoff as Mort
| 49 | 3 | "There's No Accounting" | Steve Zuckerman | Gary Jacobs | October 6, 1990 | 049 | 25.9 |
Barbara is dating a sensitive, intelligent new boyfriend and Carol is drawn to him. Bored by his new girlfriend that seems perfect for him. Guest stars: John Terlesky as Bucky Barnes, Janet Carroll as Leah, Allison Mack as Gloria
| 50 | 4 | "Barbara the Mom" | Steve Zuckerman | Harold Kimmel | October 13, 1990 | 048 | 26.1 |
Barbara is babysitting her boyfriends young kids and thinks she has no motherly instincts. Carol volunteers at the zoo and finds out the pandas only mate when she is around. Guest stars: Christopher Castile as Larry, Sumer Stamper as Annette
| 51 | 5 | "The Tortoise & the Harry" | Steve Zuckerman | Roger Garrett | October 20, 1990 | 053 | 21.5 |
Carol urges Barbara to take an art class. Harry gives a depressed boy a pet. Guest stars: Brandon Bluhm as Joey, Jaclyn Bernstein as Amanda, Debra Mooney as Mrs. Bierman
| 52 | 6 | "Mad About the Boy" | Steve Zuckerman | Pat Dougherty | October 27, 1990 | 052 | 27.4 |
Carol gets dumped once again and decides to fall for the first man she can find. Laverene decides to spice of the biography on Harry for the hospital newsletter. Special Guest Star: Michael McKean as Dennis; Guest stars: Robert Lesser as Russell, Gregory Paul Martin as Ian, Tracey Willsie as Inga, Mary Catherine Wright as Ms. Bingham
| 53 | 7 | "Honey, I Shrunk Laverne" | Steve Zuckerman | Miriam Trogdon | November 3, 1990 | 051 | 23.4 |
After Harry complains that Laverne makes to many office decisions without him so Laverne quits. Carol decides to talk Barbara into joining her poker game. Special Guest Stars: Mary Pat Gleason as Nurse Bradford, Art Metrano as Art; Guest stars: John Apicella as John, Ed Call as Ed, Nana Visitor as Dr. Dawn Phelps
| 54 | 8 | "The Boy Next Door" | Steve Zuckerman | Rob LaZebnik | November 10, 1990 | 054 | 28.9 |
Carol and Charley sleep together during a moment of weakness. Guest stars: Ashley Bank as Kid #1, Michael Melby as Kid #2, Gloria Dorson as Mrs. Hill, Candace Hutson as Cindy
| 55 | 9 | "A Family Affair" | Steve Zuckerman | Susan Beavers | November 17, 1990 | 055 | 28.1 |
Barbara has a new boyfriend and Harry thinks he is married. Harry and the girls are worried that Dreyfuss is getting to fat so they put him on a diet. Guest stars: Mitchell Laurance as Scott, Cecelia Riddett as Mother
| 56 | 10 | "Someone to Watch Over Me" | Steve Zuckerman | Sydney Blake & Bill Braunstein | November 24, 1990 | 056 | 27.0 |
Charley is in the hospital and wants visitors, not getting any he hires actors to be his parents. Meanwhile neighbors accuse Dreyfuss of fathering their dogs' puppies. Guest stars: Fred Applegate as Mr. Patrick, Eddie Bracken as Fred, Dena Dietrich as Ursula, Robert Gorman as Norman, Brandon Adams as Georgie, Marti Muller as Nurse, Susan Krebs as Norman's Mother
| 57 | 11 | "Harry Knows Best" | Steve Zuckerman | David Sacks | December 8, 1990 | 057 | 24.8 |
When one of Harry's patients announces that she wants a nose job. Charley wants a career as a gigolo, and the Westons decided to take a family a portrait. Guest stars: Mayim Bialik as Laurie Kincaid, Judith-Marie Bergan as Paula Conroy, Kat Sawyer-Young as Woman, Stan Roth as Photographer
| 58 | 12 | "Whenever I Feel Afraid" | Steve Zuckerman | Harold Kimmel | December 15, 1990 | 058 | 27.0 |
Laverne is mugged and is feeling insecure about it. A new neighbor moves in and Carol and Barbara are both vying for him. Guest stars: Timothy Carhart as Billy, Ben Ryan Ganger as Billy, Jay R. Goldenberg as Attendant, Robert Gould as Customer, Aaron Lustig as Officer Hitner
| 59 | 13 | "A Shot in the Dark" | Steve Zuckerman | Roger Garrett | January 5, 1991 | 061 | 26.7 |
Barbara shoots Carol's boyfriend because she thinks he is a burglar. So he stays with the Weston's until he is healed. Laverne has a crippling fear of public speaking, so Harry decides to help her. Guest stars: Channing Chase as Emcee & Paul Sand as Avery
| 60 | 14 | "Sucking Up Is Hard to Do" | Steve Zuckerman | Pat Dougherty | January 19, 1991 | 062 | 22.1 |
Barbara is up for a promotion at the police station but must learn the hard way about sucking up, with a little help from Carol. Laverne tries her hand at matchmaking for Harry. Charley gets a tattoo and maybe more. Meanwhile, Dr. Weston tells a young evangelist to stop preaching. Guest stars: Rebecca Bush as Anne, Patricia Gaul as Mrs. Moses, Paul Eiding as Hartman, Judy Baldwin as Michelle, May Quigley as Woman, Shuko Akune as Secretary & Whit Hertford as Timmy
| 61 | 15 | "The Man That Got Away" | Steve Zuckerman | Doug Smart & Susan Beavers | January 26, 1991 | 063 | 28.5 |
Barbara tries to date a man named Fred who shows no interest in her while Laverne has to break the tie vote as to whether her home town of Hickory should install a traffic signal at its sole intersection. Guest stars: Craig Bierko as Fred, Jeff Doucette as Sam & Jana Arnold as Lurlene
| 62 | 16 | "The Mentor" | Steve Zuckerman | Arnie Kogen | February 2, 1991 | 059 | 26.2 |
Harry's mentor rejoins the hospital after being away. Later a member of the board approaches Harry telling him that they want to get rid of his mentor because he is making mistakes. Harry thinks they're doing this because of his age. But when Harry discovers he is making serious mistakes, he asks the man to step down or they'll get rid of him. Guest stars: Danny Thomas as Dr. Leo Brewster & Harvey Jason as Dr. Wakefield. This would be the final television role for Danny Thomas who died 4 days after this episode aired.
| 63 | 17 | "The Dog Who Knew Too Much" | Steve Zuckerman | Gary Jacobs | February 9, 1991 | 060 | 25.7 |
Each of the Weston's pour their hearts out to Dreyfuss, the girls each decide that they want to move out. Guest stars: Tina Johnson as Mrs. Knox & John Christian Graas as Timmy
| 64 | 18 | "Guess Who's Coming to Dinner?" | Steve Zuckerman | Rob LaZebnik | February 16, 1991 | 064 | 26.8 |
When Harry starts dating a 28 year old, it upsets Carol, Barbara and the girls parents. Meanwhile Laverne trains a new trainee. Guest stars: Phil Hartman as Tim Cornell, Tracy Kolis as Paige, Kenneth Kimmins as Pete, Valorie Armstrong as Gayle, Lance Davis as Waiter & Jaclyn Bernstein as Nancy
| 65 | 19 | "All About Harry" | Steve Zuckerman | Meredith Siler | March 9, 1991 | 066 | 23.0 |
Harry dates a journalist who intends to write about their romance. Meanwhile, Charley is concerned that his libido had dropped off. Guest star: Christine Ebersole as Laura
| 66 | 20 | "Drive, He Said" | Steve Zuckerman | David Sacks | March 16, 1991 | 065 | 20.2 |
Everyone plans a surprise party for Charley, Harry is supposed to get him back to the house but Charley is more interested in finding an old girlfriend who he never got over. Guest stars: Eric Allan Kramer as Apartment Manager, Micole Mecurio as Salesperson, Kenneth Danzinger as Airline Clerk, Robert Gould as Party Guest #1 & Don Sparks as Party Guest #2
| 67 | 21 | "The Last Temptation of Laverne" | Steve Zuckerman | Pat Dougherty & Harold Kimmel | March 23, 1991 | 067 | 24.3 |
Lavern's manipulative Aunt visits her and blackmails her into taking the blame for a car accident that she was not at fault. Carol and Barbara decided to give an old man who is moving into a senior home a final last day of adventure. Guest stars: Doris Roberts as Aunt Retha, Henry Jones as Arnold & David Correia as Fire Marshal
| 68 | 22 | "What's Eating You?" | Robert Berlinger | Sydney Blake & Bill Braunstein | April 13, 1991 | 069 | 24.0 |
Harry and Carol try to take care of Barbara when she develops an ulcer. Laverne searches for a discontinued brand of band-aids. Guest stars: Michael Goldfinger as Tony, Richard McKenzie as Davidson & Lynne Marie Stewart as Secretary
| 69 | 23 | "The Cruise" | Doug Smart | Arnie Kogen | May 4, 1991 | 070 | 22.4 |
Barbara practices for a talent show while on a cruise. Harry tries to avoid two ladies who will not leave him alone. Charley steers the ship into the Bermuda triangle while Carol finds the man of her dreams. Guest stars: Richard Burgi as Matthew Wright, Peggy Pope as Myrna, Pearl Shear as Charlotte, Teresa Ganzel as Simba Katzman & David Jay Willis as Emcee
| 70 | 24 | "The Way We Are" | Steve Zuckerman | Paul B. Price & Laura O'Hare | May 11, 1991 | 068 | 18.7 |
Harry who is looking forward to a childhood sweetheart visiting is excited, until a childhood rival also resurfaces. Charlie is confused what FICA is because they are taking part of his paycheck. Guest stars: Shirley Jones as Jean McDowell, Edward Winter as Eric Lancaster, Christopher Pettiet as Young Harry, Robin Lynn Heath as Young Jean, Tom Henschel as Bartender & Cory Danzinger as Little Eric

=== Season 4 (1991–92) ===
| No. overall | No. in season | Title | Directed by | Written by | Original release date | Prod. code | U.S. viewers (millions) |
|---|---|---|---|---|---|---|---|
| 71 | 1 | "50 Million Men and a Baby" | Steve Zuckerman | Peter Gallay | September 21, 1991 | 072 | 23.7 |
Laverne's cousin needs someone to watch her baby and the task is given to Barbara and Carol. Much to Harry's chagrin, the girls start talking about having a baby through a sperm bank.
| 72 | 2 | "Almost Like Being in Love" | Steve Zuckerman | Fred Freeman & Lawrence J. Cohen | September 28, 1991 | 073 | 21.9 |
Harry is very enamored with his new beau, which gets him thinking about popping the question.
| 73 | 3 | "Her Cheatin' Heart" | Steve Zuckerman | Pat Dougherty | October 5, 1991 | 074 | 22.6 |
Lavarne goes on a date while Nick is out of town. Carol confesses to Babara that she stole her first boyfriend from her at camp years ago.
| 74 | 4 | "Food for Thought" | Steve Zuckerman | Regina Stewart | October 12, 1991 | 071 | 21.7 |
Carol is tired of her job at the library so she decides to open a catering business. Meanwhile, Laverne is having problems with her mechanic getting her car repaired in a timely manner.
| 75 | 5 | "Harry's Got a Gun" | Steve Zuckerman | David Richardson | October 19, 1991 | 076 | 18.8 |
Carol buys a gun after the Westons' house is robbed.
| 76 | 6 | "The Dreyfuss Affair" | Steve Zuckerman | Rob LaZebnik | October 26, 1991 | 075 | 17.8 |
Dreyfuss needs surgery so Harry hires only the best to perform it. Meanwhile Charley contemplates a career change.
| 77 | 7 | "Country Weston" | Steve Zuckerman | Story by : Pat Dougherty & Lisa Sanderson; Teleplay by : Pat Dougherty | November 2, 1991 | 078 | 22.5 |
Garth Brooks offers a job to Barbara as security chief on his tour. Charley's house is being fumigated so he moves in with the Westons.
| 78 | 8 | "Windy" | Steve Zuckerman | Arnie Kogen | November 9, 1991 | 077 | 29.7 |
A hurricane hits just as the Westons prepare to move out of the house.
| 79 | 9 | "Talk, Talk, Talk" | Steve Zuckerman | David Richardson | November 16, 1991 | 080 | 23.4 |
Harry gets invited to be a call-in radio show about medicine. Meanwhile Barbara and Charley enter a chili cook-off.
| 80 | 10 | "Lonely Are the Brave" | Steve Zuckerman | Roger Garrett | November 23, 1991 | 081 | 21.5 |
Barbara is being honored by the police, which sets off Carol's jealousy bug. Laverne upsets Harry when she questions a diagnosis of a patient.
| 81 | 11 | "If You Knew Andy Like I Know..." | Steve Zuckerman | Lyla Oliver | December 7, 1991 | 079 | 21.8 |
Carol starts a new relationship with a man who is a little self obsessed. Harry's new hire does not meet the standards that he has set.
| 82 | 12 | "My Nurse Is Back and There's Gonna Be Trouble..." | Steve Zuckerman | Harold Kimmel | December 14, 1991 | 082 | 18.1 |
While Laverne is away, Harry brings in his old nurse to cover for her vacation. But when Laverne gets back, she tells Laverne that she is not leaving and is going to take her job.
| 83 | 13 | "The Son of a Preacherman" | Steve Zuckerman | Rob LaZebnik | January 4, 1992 | 083 | 22.8 |
Harry takes in a young boy to observe while he works, Harry finds out that he is only doing it because his father wants him to do it so he can become a doctor one day.
| 84 | 14 | "Ex-Appeal" | Steve Zuckerman | Sandy Krinski & Ed Scharlach | January 11, 1992 | 084 | 20.9 |
Carol starts to date one of Barbara's old boyfriends, which turns out bad for Carol as he seems to have feelings for Barbara still.
| 85 | 15 | "The Great Escape" | Steve Zuckerman | Arnie Kogen | January 18, 1992 | 085 | 25.2 |
Barbara and Carol are taken hostage by an escaped convict, with Harry and Laverne on their way to a medical seminar, they are short on people to rescue them.
| 86 | 16 | "The Mismatchmaker" | Steve Zuckerman | Roger Garrett | February 1, 1992 | 086 | 19.7 |
Harry is doing his best to reconcile an old friend and his wife but is finding it difficult. Meanwhile Barbara hires Carol and her catering company to a Police function.
| 87 | 17 | "The Return of Aunt Susan" | Steve Zuckerman | Story by : Dinah Manoff & David Richardson; Teleplay by : David Richardson | February 8, 1992 | 087 | 19.4 |
Aunt Susan makes an overdue visit, giving Carol the chance to get to know her better.
| 88 | 18 | "The Unimportance of Being Charley" | Steve Zuckerman | Ursula Ziegler & Steven Sullivan | February 15, 1992 | 088 | 16.9 |
Charley attempts to fool his parents when he tells them that he is Captain of the ship he works on. Meanwhile Carol believes that Harry favors Barbara over her.
| 89 | 19 | "Sayonara" | Steve Zuckerman | Rob LaZebnik | February 22, 1992 | 089 | 17.3 |
Nick leaves Laverne for a woman in Japan. Barbara goes undercover at a college sorority to catch an alleged computer hacker.
| 90 | 20 | "Dr. Weston and Mr. Hyde" | Doug Smart | Peter Gallay | February 29, 1992 | 090 | 23.2 |
The full moon on Leap Day causes Harry to act most unusual when he throws out his back. Meanwhile, Barbara believes the full moon is causing Dreyfuss to be other than his usual self.
| 91 | 21 | "Charley for President" | Doug Smart | Pat Dougherty | March 14, 1992 | 091 | 20.0 |
In need of a new home owner association President Carol pushes Charley into running for the position. Barbara tries all sorts of disguises to fool Dr. Weston while she is on an undercover job at the hospital.
| 92 | 22 | "Good Neighbor Harry" | Steve Zuckerman | Harold Kimmel | March 28, 1992 | 092 | 19.1 |
Carol's new boyfriend is amazing although he has a very annoying laugh. Meanwhile Harry does a good deed for a neighbor, which ends up backfiring on him as she soon would not leave his side.
| 93 | 23 | "Final Analysis" | Steve Zuckerman | Arnie Kogen | April 25, 1992 | 093 | 17.3 |
Carol starts to feel good and is nearing a breakthrough in therapy when her therapist dies she feels lost. Harry's new patient likes to make smart ass remarks towards him.
| 94 | 24 | "Roots" | Steve Zuckerman | Roger Garrett & David Richardson | May 2, 1992 | 094 | 18.5 |
Charley and the Westons travel to England where they head to their ancestral home of Weston Castle. Harry is going to be awarded the Sword of Weston. As Harry explores the castle he ends up getting lost, follows a secret passage and ends up in the dungeon.

=== Season 5 (1992–93) ===
| No. overall | No. in season | Title | Directed by | Written by | Original release date | Prod. code | U.S. viewers (millions) |
|---|---|---|---|---|---|---|---|
| 95 | 1 | "Why Do Fools Fall in Love?" | Dinah Manoff | Ursula Ziegler & Steven Sullivan | September 19, 1992 | 098 | 19.7 |
When Charlie receives a threatening note from a fling, Barbara agrees to stay the night at his place, but he ends up falling for her.
| 96 | 2 | "Take My Garage, Please" | Steve Zuckerman | Fred Freeman & Lawrence J. Cohen | September 26, 1992 | 095 | 18.1 |
Carol falls for a sculptor who moves into Harry's garage.
| 97 | 3 | "R.N. on the Rebound" | Steve Zuckerman | Pat Dougherty | October 3, 1992 | 096 | 17.0 |
Laverne is set up on a date by Barbara, its a bit of a grim surprise when Laverne finds out that the date is with a coroner's assistant. Meanwhile, Charley and Patrick have bonded over their love of art, much to Carol's annoyance.
| 98 | 4 | "...Or Forever Hold Your Peace" | Doug Smart | Roger Garrett | October 10, 1992 | 099 | 17.2 |
Arthur announces suddenly that he is getting married. Harry is shocked and tell him that he thinks he is rushing in. Upset about his reaction Arthur ends his friendship with Harry. Meanwhile Carol joins a protest so she can get arrested.
| 99 | 5 | "The Boomerang Affair" | Steve Zuckerman | David Richardson | October 17, 1992 | 097 | 15.2 |
Harry is trying desperately to establish a relationship with high-flying Sonya, but realizes too late that she is very high maintenance. Meanwhile Laverne has an ulcer and does her best to hide it from anyone else.
| 100 | 6 | "Cruel and Unusual Punishment" | Steve Zuckerman | Wendy Braff | October 24, 1992 | 101 | 14.1 |
Carol has to serve on a jury who finds a man guilty, she feels so bad about the sentencing that she hires an ex-con to work at her catering business.
| 101 | 7 | "It's Not Easy Being Green" | James Widdoes | Ursula Ziegler & Steven Sullivan | October 31, 1992 | 100 | 18.0 |
Mean old witch Laverne guilts Harry into helping her pass out Halloween candy dressed as Dracula. Carol masquerades as Madame Curie and forces Patrick to attend a party dressed as her idea of radium.
| 102 | 8 | "Dirty Harry" | Renny Temple | Pat Dougherty | November 7, 1992 | 103 | 16.2 |
Carol convinces Harry and Patrick to appear with her on television with Geraldo Rivera.
| 103 | 9 | "Timing Is Everything" | Steve Zuckerman | Cheryl Holliday | November 14, 1992 | 104 | 16.9 |
Harry tries to start up a relationship with an old friend. Meanwhile when Carol buys an exercise set for Patrick she has a hard time putting it together, so she enlists Charley to do it for her.
| 104 | 10 | "Thanksgiving at the Westons" | Steve Zuckerman | Arnie Kogen | November 21, 1992 | 105 | 16.6 |
Because of previous Thanksgiving dinners Laverne is very reluctant to join the Weston's for dinner after Harry invites her.
| 105 | 11 | "The Body Beautiful" | Steve Zuckerman | Tim Kelleher | December 5, 1992 | 102 | 15.1 |
Harry is having a moral dilemma when he finds out that one of his patients is using steroids. Carol is upset with Patrick as he is using a nude model for his work. Meanwhile Laverene is put in charge of fire drills.
| 106 | 12 | "Overboard" | Steve Zuckerman | Paul B. Price | December 12, 1992 | 106 | 14.9 |
Charley goes on a cruise but a storm strands him adrift on a raft. Carol and Patrick both go for a job together but awkwardness soon ensues when on only one of them gets the job.
| 107 | 13 | "Emily" | Steve Zuckerman | Rob LaZebnik | January 2, 1993 | 107 | 17.7 |
When little sister Emily returns from College, Carol decides it would be a good idea to be her mentor. She decides to set her up with Patrick's friend on a blind date. It soon turns out that Emily already has a boyfriend, and she is not too keen on keeping him much to his dismay.
| 108 | 14 | "The Sting" | Steve Zuckerman | Peter Gallay | January 9, 1993 | 108 | 18.8 |
Emily is asked by the F.B.I. to help them catch her bookie boyfriend. Meanwhile Charley is taught CPR by Laverne.
| 109 | 15 | "The Fracas in Vegas" | Steve Zuckerman | David Richardson | January 23, 1993 | 111 | 15.7 |
Charley and Harry get conned in Las Vegas.
| 110 | 16 | "Pardon My Flashback" | Steve Zuckerman | Pat Dougherty | January 30, 1993 | 109 | N/A |
In a flashback episode during the Super Bowl, everyone is gathered around the television and the Westons, Laverne and Charley reflect on times gone by.
| 111 | 17 | "Dog Day Afternoon" | Steve Zuckerman | Roger Garrett | February 6, 1993 | 113 | 15.7 |
Dreyfuss ignores Carol after she yells at him so she seeks out an animal psychologist for help. Harry, meanwhile, has gifted Laverne a tiny share in the local galleria, while also inspiring Charley to start reading literature.
| 112 | 18 | "More to Love" | Steve Zuckerman | Harold Kimmel & Ross Abrash and Ursula Ziegler & Steve Sullivan | February 13, 1993 | 112 | 15.6 |
Emily is dating one of Carol's old school friends; he jokes compulsively about the fact he has a weight problem. Meanwhile Laverne is spending all her free time gossiping on the phone to other nurses, but is not so thrilled when the gossip turns to her.
| 113 | 19 | "My Dad, My Doctor" | Steve Zuckerman | Wendy Braff | February 20, 1993 | 114 | 16.3 |
Harry gets upset when Emily tears a ligament in her need and requires surgery, but ends up going with another doctors plan of physical therapy. Meanwhile Patrick goes camping and Charley joins in on the fun.
| 114 | 20 | "Love and Marriage" | Steve Zuckerman | Pat Dougherty | February 27, 1993 | 116 | 17.0 |
Carol and Emily become bridesmaids for their cousin's wedding, while Charley is assigned to do community service at the hospital.
| 115 | 21 | "The All-American Boy - Not!" | Steve Zuckerman | Peter Gallay | March 20, 1993 | 115 | 16.6 |
A young shoplifter is caught while Harry is working at a free clinic and Harry quickly befriends him and brings him home. The boy turns out to be an uncontrolled diabetic who ends up running away, taking along all of the Weston's' furniture with him.
| 116 | 22 | "Two for the Road" | Steve Zuckerman | David Richardson | April 10, 1993 | 117 | 12.9 |
Patrick and Emily are driving back from New York in his van. Carol worries about what they could be doing together.
| 117 | 23 | "Aunt Verne Knows Best" | Steve Zuckerman | Ursula Ziegler & Steven Sullivan | May 1, 1993 | 118 | 13.8 |
Laverne's nephew, Wade, comes to Miami for college. She wants him to stay with her rather than living in the dorm.
| 118 | 24 | "My Mother, My Self" | Steve Zuckerman | Ursula Ziegler & Steven Sullivan | May 8, 1993 | 120 | 12.8 |
Charley's mom is in town for Mother's Day and immediately becomes attracted to Harry. Carol takes a trip to meet Patrick's mother.
| 119 | 25 | "Charley to the Rescue" | Steve Zuckerman | Rob LaZebnik | May 15, 1993 | 119 | 14.0 |
While working on Charley's cruise ship Emily works as a waitress where she is harassed by an obnoxious comic. Laverne thinks she has found the perfect match for Dr. Weston.
| 120 | 26 | "Surprise! Surprise!" | Steve Zuckerman | Arnie Kogen | May 22, 1993 | 110 | 13.6 |
Harry overhears Charley planning a surprise party, Harry whose birthday it is on that day thinks its for him, but soon finds out he is wrong.

=== Season 6 (1993–94) ===
| No. overall | No. in season | Title | Directed by | Written by | Original release date | Prod. code | U.S. viewers (millions) |
|---|---|---|---|---|---|---|---|
| 121 | 1 | "When the Rooster Dies" | Steve Zuckerman | Peter Gallay | September 25, 1993 | 121 | 18.1 |
Harry gets involved with a clinic run by Dr. Maxine Douglas, while Sophia Petrillo moves back into the neighborhood.
| 122 | 2 | "Bye-Bye Baby...Hello" | Steve Zuckerman | Pat Dougherty | October 2, 1993 | 122 | 14.8 |
| 123 | 3 | "Bye-Bye Baby...Hello" | Steve Zuckerman | Pat Dougherty | October 9, 1993 | 123 | 17.5 |
Carol throws Patrick out before discovering she's pregnant with his baby. Carol tries to figure out how to tell Patrick she is pregnant.
| 124 | 4 | "Mama Todd, the Sequel" | Steve Zuckerman | Ursula Ziegler & Steven Sullivan | October 16, 1993 | 125 | 14.2 |
Laverne's ex-mother-in-law visits: Carol seeks a godfather for her baby.
| 125 | 5 | "Mom's the Word" | Steve Zuckerman | Regina Stewart Larsen | October 23, 1993 | 124 | 14.0 |
Pregnant Carol goes on a date and is afraid to tell him that she is expecting; Maxine and Laverne fight over baby-shower details.
| 126 | 6 | "Diary of a Mad Housewife" | Steve Zuckerman | Bob Tischler | October 30, 1993 | 126 | 14.8 |
After reading her mother's old diary, Carol thinks that she was not wanted; meanwhile, Maxine is annoyed by a mime and a hypochondriac at the clinic.
| 127 | 7 | "Mother Dearest" | Steve Zuckerman | Rick Newberger | November 6, 1993 | 129 | 16.2 |
Maxine's mother arrives in Miami for a visit. She's been having headaches, so Maxine and Harry trick her into seeing an eye doctor; the results are a surprise. Meanwhile, Laverne tries to give Harry a haircut.
| 128 | 8 | "No Volunteers, Please" | Steve Zuckerman | Dennis Snee | November 13, 1993 | 127 | 15.3 |
A somewhat socially awkward woman volunteers at the clinic and starts to send flowers and dinner invitations to Laverne which gives her the wrong idea. Meanwhile Carol does her best to get her unborn child enrolled in a posh preschool.
| 129 | 9 | "Das Boob" | Steve Zuckerman | Paul B. Price | November 20, 1993 | 128 | 13.2 |
Harry and Charley are lost at sea, Maxine attempts to conquer her fear of public speaking.
| 130 | 10 | "The Girl Who Cried Baby" | Steve Zuckerman | Susan Beavers | November 27, 1993 | 131 | 16.0 |
Carol goes twice into what she thinks is labor -- but the third time's the charm.
| 131 | 11 | "Superbaby" | Steve Zuckerman | Peter Gallay | December 11, 1993 | 132 | 13.9 |
Carol's baby arrives home but Carol thinks he was switched at birth.
| 132 | 12 | "Read All About It" | Dinah Manoff | Greg Phillips | December 18, 1993 | 130 | 13.6 |
Harry subs for Maxine in a newspaper interview; Charley makes a dogged attempt to date a vet.
| 133 | 13 | "Love a la Mode" | Steve Zuckerman | Ursula Ziegler & Steven Sullivan | January 8, 1994 | 135 | 13.1 |
Carol joins a mother-child support group where she gets the impression, she's a bad parent
| 134 | 14 | "What's a Mother to Do?" | Steve Zuckerman | Ellen Sandler & Cindy Chupack | January 15, 1994 | 133 | 14.5 |
Charley announces he's going to marry a waitress.
| 135 | 15 | "Gesundeit" | Steve Zuckerman | Dennis Snee | January 22, 1994 | 136 | 14.4 |
Carol joins a mother-child support group where she gets the impression, she's a bad parent.
| 136 | 16 | "Under the Gun" | Steve Zuckerman | Regina Stewart Larsen | January 29, 1994 | 137 | 16.2 |
Baby Scotty's allergies act up around Dreyfuss, who's sent to live with Charley.
| 137 | 17 | "Brotherly Shove" | Dinah Manoff | Drake Sather | February 5, 1994 | 138 | 13.0 |
Charley starts working alongside his brother at a used-car lot.
| 138 | 18 | "The Ballad of Shady Pines" | Steve Zuckerman | Rick Newberger | February 12, 1994 | 134 | 12.3 |
Laverne helps out at Shady Pines and Sophia's boyfriend makes a pass at her. Meanwhile Maxine house sits (with help from Charley) for Harry and Carol who go to Orlando.
| 139 | 19 | "Hog Heaven" | Steve Zuckerman | Bob Tischler | March 5, 1994 | 139 | 12.2 |
Laverne goes hog-wild when her old boyfriend roars into town on his motorcycle, while Carol becomes an amateur filmmaker after her uncle sends her a video camera.
| 140 | 20 | "Charley's Millions" | Steve Zuckerman | Rick Newberger | March 12, 1994 | 140 | 13.6 |
Charley receives an inheritance, he assembles all the people that mean a lot to him over the years. Harry, Sophia, Carol and Don Adams from Get Smart all join him on a trip to Mardi Gras.
| 141 | 21 | "Half That Jazz" | Doug Smart | Dennis Snee & Regina Stewart Larsen | April 2, 1994 | 144 | 13.2 |
Harry's jazz idol Sonny Baxter is asked to come out of retirement to play a benefit for him. Sophia puts a curse on Charley after he dumps her niece.
| 142 | 22 | "The Devil and Dr. Weston" | Steve Zuckerman | Kari Lizer | April 9, 1994 | 142 | 13.0 |
Harry is hit on by a wealthy philanthropist. Meanwhile socially awkward Doris, who used to volunteer at the clinic, is helped by Carol who now sells door to door roll on mousse.
| 143 | 23 | "A Foreign Affair" | Steve Zuckerman | Peter Gallay | April 16, 1994 | 141 | 11.0 |
A Marriage proposal from Maxine's boyfriend catches her off guard. Carol starts to learn how to play guitar.
| 144 | 24 | "Lordy, Lordy, Landlordy" | Steve Zuckerman | Cody R. Farley | April 23, 1994 | 146 | 11.3 |
When the horrible landlord for the clinic refuses to fix the problems Laverne threatens a rent strike, which ends up getting them evicted. Carol is convinced by Sophia to take a little time away from the baby, but she is unable to let go.
| 145 | 25 | "Absence Makes the Nurse Grow Weirder" | Steve Zuckerman | Ursula Ziegler & Steven Sullivan | May 21, 1994 | 145 | 7.8 |
After filling in at his old practice Harry falls for the new nurse. Meanwhile the day that Harry and Laverne first started working together dawns and she is upset that Harry totally forgot about it.
| 146 | 26 | "Best Friends" | Doug Smart | Paul B. Price & Bob Tischler | May 21, 1994 | 143 | 9.5 |
When Carol's childhood friend starts dating Harry, she become very upset. A member of the family that's feuded with Laverne for years shows up as a patient.

=== Season 7 (1994–95) ===
| No. overall | No. in season | Title | Directed by | Written by | Original release date | Prod. code | U.S. viewers (millions) |
|---|---|---|---|---|---|---|---|
| 147 | 1 | "Let's Give Them Something to Talk About" | Steve Zuckerman | Ursula Ziegler & Steven Sullivan | September 24, 1994 | 148 | 10.9 |
Carol is thrilled to get a job at a local newspaper, until she discovers that it is a job to chauffeur around the paper's teenage reporter. Charley and Laverne begin to spend a lot of time together, sparking rumours to fly.
| 148 | 2 | "Mrs. Clinton Comes to Town" | Steve Zuckerman | Andy Guerdat | September 24, 1994 | 149 | 10.9 |
When Mrs. Hillary Clinton is scheduled to tour the clinic Carol is determined to get a meeting with her. But her trouble only lands her in jail along with Laverne and Charley.
| 149 | 3 | "Just for Laughs" | Dinah Manoff | Paul B. Price | October 1, 1994 | 147 | 9.5 |
After a number of failed new careers Charley tries his hand at stand-up comedy which is based on making fun of Harry whilst doing so. Maxine fights the bus company when they move the bus shelter.
| 150 | 4 | "A Chip Off the Old Charley" | Doug Smart | Vince Cheung & Ben Montanio | October 8, 1994 | 150 | 9.2 |
Charley discover that a 17 year old boy who just happens to be a flutist is his son. Carol takes over for the day for Laverne and while there she tries to get Maxine to stop smoking.
| 151 | 5 | "The Woman Who Came to Dither" | Doug Smart | Dennis Snee | October 15, 1994 | 151 | 8.4 |
While Laverne is still away, shy Doris, now a qualified nurse, is back to fill in for her. Meanwhile, Harry gets upset when Sophia moves in and brings her Shady Pines friends with her.
| 152 | 6 | "Carol Gets a Raise" | Doug Smart | Andy Guerdat | October 22, 1994 | 152 | 8.1 |
Carol is put into an awkward position at work with her boss; and Maxine fills in for Harry at an elementary school speaking engagement.
| 153 | 7 | "The Courtship of Carol's Father" | Steve Zuckerman | Ursula Ziegler & Steven Sullivan | December 3, 1994 | 153 | 8.6 |
Carol fixes up Harry with a lounge singer after an ex invites him to her wedding.
| 154 | 8 | "The Tinker Grant" | Steve Zuckerman | Peter Gallay | December 3, 1994 | 154 | 8.9 |
The Canal Street clinic applies for a grant and is evaluated, when the man leaves his notebook Maxine takes it and reads it. Sophia gives Charley advice on how to impress his Italia girlfriends parents.
| 155 | 9 | "Would You Believe..." | Steve Zuckerman | Paul B. Price & Dennis Snee | December 17, 1994 | 156 | 8.5 |
Charley is dating a new minister and brings her by the Weston's place, Harry quickly finds himself attracted to her. Meanwhile Laverne sells her beloved truck to Maxine.
| 156 | 10 | "Partly Cloudy with a Chance of Pain" | Steve Zuckerman | Mark Grant | December 17, 1994 | 155 | 9.2 |
Maxine starts dating a weatherman and gets some unwanted attention. Carol and Charley make a friendly wager.
| 157 | 11 | "Single White Male" | Steve Zuckerman | Andy Guerdat | January 7, 1995 | 159 | 9.8 |
Charley has a goodlooking new roommate, who he hopes will help him meet more women. There is something Charley has yet to figure out about him. Meanwhile, Harry invites Maxine to join him and two friends in a golfing foursome.
| 158 | 12 | "Dear Aunt Martha" | Steve Zuckerman | Vince Cheung & Ben Montanio | January 14, 1995 | 158 | 10.0 |
Carol believes a man she been dating since they met in a museum is the same man who has been writing letters to the "Aunt Martha" column in her newspaper. Meanwhile and old sparring partner of Harry's shows up with a score to settle.
| 159 | 13 | "Goodbye Charley" | Steve Zuckerman | Peter Gallay | January 21, 1995 | 157 | 9.8 |
Charley fearing his own mortality after a recent death causes him to feel depressed. Carol does her best to boost his moral by staging a funeral for him.
| 160 | 14 | "Family Practice" | Steve Zuckerman | Bob Tischler & Regina Stewart Larsen | January 28, 1995 | 160 | 9.9 |
After having to get gall bladder surgery a patient asks Maxine to take care of her children while she is under the knife. Harry is invited to the Shady Pines square dance by Sophia.
| 161 | 15 | "Grandma, What Big Eyes You Have" | Steve Zuckerman | Dennis Snee & Paul B. Price | February 4, 1995 | 161 | 9.7 |
While at the park with Scotty, Harry becomes smitten with a woman there with her granddaughter. Laverne finds a parrot and brings it to the office. Carol becomes obsessed with shopping at discount clubs.
| 162 | 16 | "Feelings, Whoa Whoa Whoa, Feelings..." | Dinah Manoff | David Rosenberg | February 25, 1995 | 164 | 8.2 |
Laverne has a handsome childhood friend visit from back home. Of course, Carol becomes interested in him. Charley is asked to pose for pictures in a magazine.
| 163 | 17 | "And Kevin Makes Three" | Steve Zuckerman | Andy Guerdat | March 4, 1995 | 163 | 10.4 |
Carol becomes jealous of her new boyfriend Kevin when he bonds so quickly with her son Scotty. Meanwhile, Laverne decides to learn the Spanish language.
| 164 | 18 | "Harry Weston: Man's Best Friend" | Steve Zuckerman | Ursula Ziegler & Steven Sullivan | March 18, 1995 | 162 | 10.3 |
Much to Charley's dismay Harry becomes Carol's boss' new best friend which makes him extremely jealous. Laverne decides to audition for a part in a commercial where she will play the voice of a cartoon owl.
| 165 | 19 | "The Ex-Files" | Doug Smart | Jack Amiel & Michael Begler | March 18, 1995 | 165 | 11.5 |
Carol meets Kevin's beautiful and intelligent ex-wife which leads her to believe that there relationship is over. Charley eats some old Chinese food from the Weston's fridge and get sick so he decides to sue Harry.
| 166 | 20 | "Stand by Your Man" | Dinah Manoff | Ron Bloomberg | March 25, 1995 | 166 | 9.6 |
Matt and Laverne's relationship keeps getting interrupted with prompts her to go out with Maxine, Charley and his friend Bud, she quickly hits it off with him. Harry meets a woman who has a female dog that looks a lot like Dreyfuss so he asks her to breed the two.
| 167 | 21 | "Life Goes On" | Steve Zuckerman | Peter Gallay | April 29, 1995 | 168 169 | 11.6 |
| 168 | 22 | "Life Goes On" | Steve Zuckerman | Ursula Ziegler, Steven Sullivan, Dennis Snee & Paul B. Price | April 29, 1995 | 168 169 | 11.6 |
Wedding preparations become frustrating for Laverne. Harry makes plans to move to Vermont which upsets Carol. Sophia and Charley drive to Hickory for Laverne's wedding. Laverne runs away to elope while Kevin shows up in Hickory to make up with Carol. Harry gets an offer on the house. Barbara comes to visit to help the family pack. Note: This is the series finale of Empty Nest.
| 169 | 23 | "My Pal Valy-Val" | Dinah Manoff | Dinah Manoff & Valerie Landsburg | June 10, 1995 | 167 | 6.4 |
Guest Stars: Meagen Fay as Bridget, Valerie Landsburg as Valerie & Steve Rankin as Sam
| 170 | 24 | "Remembrance of Clips Past" | Steve Zuckerman | Peter Gallay | June 17, 1995 | 170 | 5.6 |
Guest Stars: Robert Lesser as Dr. Perry Smith, John Reilly as Adam Blakely & Brittany Alyse Smith as Shanna
