= Gregory Paul Martin =

British writer and actor

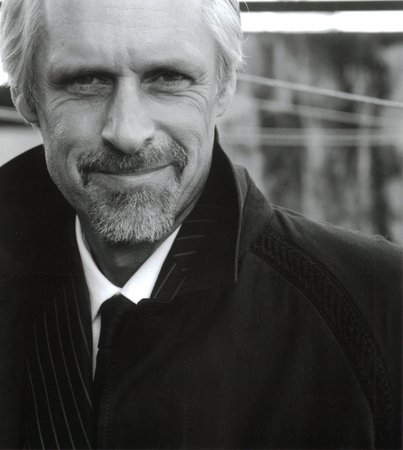
- Born: Gregory Paul Martin; 21 January 1957 (age 69); Hatfield, Hertfordshire, UK
- Other names: Greg Martin; Greg Martyn; Gregory Martyn; Gregory Martin
- Education: RADA
- Occupations: Writer, actor
- Father: George Martin
- Relatives: Giles Martin (half-brother)

Gregory Paul Martin (born 21 January 1957) is a British writer and actor. He is the eldest son of Beatles producer Sir George Martin and the half-brother of the music producer Giles Martin.

== Early life and education ==
Martin was born in 1957 in Hatfield, Hertfordshire. He is the son and second child of Sir George Martin and his first wife, Sheena (née Chisholm). George Martin left his wife and two children in 1962, when Gregory was five, in order to remarry.

Martin grew up in Hatfield and attended St Albans School in Hertfordshire, graduating in 1975.

He trained as an actor at the Royal Academy of Dramatic Art in London, graduating in 1977.

== Career ==
=== Acting ===
==== Theatre ====
Martin's acting roles in the British theatre include the world premiere of Bent (1979) at the Royal Court Theatre in London with Ian McKellen, a season at the Bristol Old Vic, a season at London's Old Vic, and a season at London's Young Vic.

His American theatre credits include the title role of Peer Gynt at the Guthrie Theater in Minneapolis, and the title role in Hamlet at the Alliance Theatre in Atlanta, as well as the American premier of Harold Pinter's Other Places, at The Manhattan Theater Club in New York City.

==== Television ====
Martin starred opposite Faye Dunaway and Richard Burton in the 1984 CBS miniseries Ellis Island. He also made appearances in a number of television series of the 1980s–1990s, including Murder, She Wrote; Sliders; Babylon 5; and Mad About You.

==== Film ====
Martin appeared in a small role in the movie Memoirs of an Invisible Man (1992), with Chevy Chase and Daryl Hannah, and in a small role in A Walk in the Clouds (1995), alongside Keanu Reeves and Debra Messing.

=== Writing ===
According to Martin, while in the U.S. in the 1980s and 1990s, he wrote and sold two Hollywood screenplays, but the films did not end up getting produced.

Following a failed whirlwind engagement to socialite Tara Palmer-Tomkinson in 1999 that made headlines, Martin penned a tongue-in-cheek send-up of his romantic life titled Dirty Rotten Scoundrel. In the book's online retail product description, he stated "I wrote this book as a satire of an ugly image foisted on me by the British tabloids during the summer of 1999, and was never intended to be taken seriously. I take it as an oddly flattering compliment people assumed the character was really me."

Martin is a professional astrologer as well. In early 2019 he published the book Watch It Come Down, detailing a death-and-rebirth cycle of the United States.

== Personal life ==
Martin married Cherie Rose Martin in 2012; they divorced in 2023. He has a son, Connor, who lives in the U.S. and was born in 1992 from his previous marriage to Natasha McKenzie.

As of 2024, Martin lives in Bray, England.

== Filmography ==
=== Film ===
Year	Title	Role	Notes
1992	Memoirs of an Invisible Man	Richard	
1995	A Walk in the Clouds	Armistead Knox	
2008	Able Danger	Luther	
2018	Nothing Is Truer Than Truth	Narrator	Documentary
2020	Lilly's Light: The Movie	Professor Crabbe	

=== Television ===
Year	Title	Role	Notes
1981	The Gentle Touch	Police Constable	Series 3, episode: "The Hit"
1984	Ellis Island	Marco Santorelli	Miniseries
1985	Murder, She Wrote	Danny Briggs	Episode 2.5: "Sing a Song of Murder"
1988	The Real Ghostbusters	Ghostmaster	Animated series; episode 4.6: "Short Stuff"
1989	Ring Raiders	Yuri Kirkov	Animated series; 5 episodes
1989–1990	CBS Schoolbreak Special	TV Reporter; Brad	"Frog Girl: The Jenifer Graham Story" "Malcolm Takes a Shot"
1990–1992	Empty Nest	Ian	Episodes 3.6 "Mad About the Boy", 4.22 "Good Neighbor Harry"
1993	Mad About You	Andrew	Episode 1.16: "Love Among the Tiles"
1994	Babylon 5	Colonel Ari Ben Zayn	Episode 1.16: "Eyes"
1994	SeaQuest DSV	Marcus Rawlings	Episode 2.11: "Dead End"
1995	Ellen	Roger	Episode 2.13: "Ellen's Improvement"
1996	Sliders	Gareth Carr	Episode 3.8: "Dragonslide"
2010	Lilly's Light	Professor Crabbe	TV film

== Bibliography ==
- Martin, Greg (2000). Dirty Rotten Scoundrel. John Blake Publishing. ISBN 978-1-85782-324-0.
- Martin, Gregory Paul (2019). Watch It Come Down: Human Consciousness, Astrology, and the Death and Rebirth of America. ISBN 978-1795043168.
