= New York Dead =

1991 novel by Stuart Woods

- First edition
- Author: Stuart Woods
- Language: English
- Series: Stone Barrington
- Genre: Suspense/thriller novel
- Publisher: HarperCollins(Hardcover, 1991); HarperTorch (Paperback, 1992 & 1995); Harper Premium (Paperback, 2009)
- Publication date: October 1991
- Publication place: United States
- Media type: Print (Paperback)
- Pages: 400 pp
- ISBN: 0-06-171186-1
- Followed by: Dirt (novel)

New York Dead is the first novel in the Stone Barrington series by Stuart Woods.

It was first published in 1991 by HarperCollins. The novel takes place in New York City. The novel begins the story of Stone Barrington, a retired detective turned lawyer/private investigator.
