= Catherine Fleming Bruce =

American politician (born 1961)

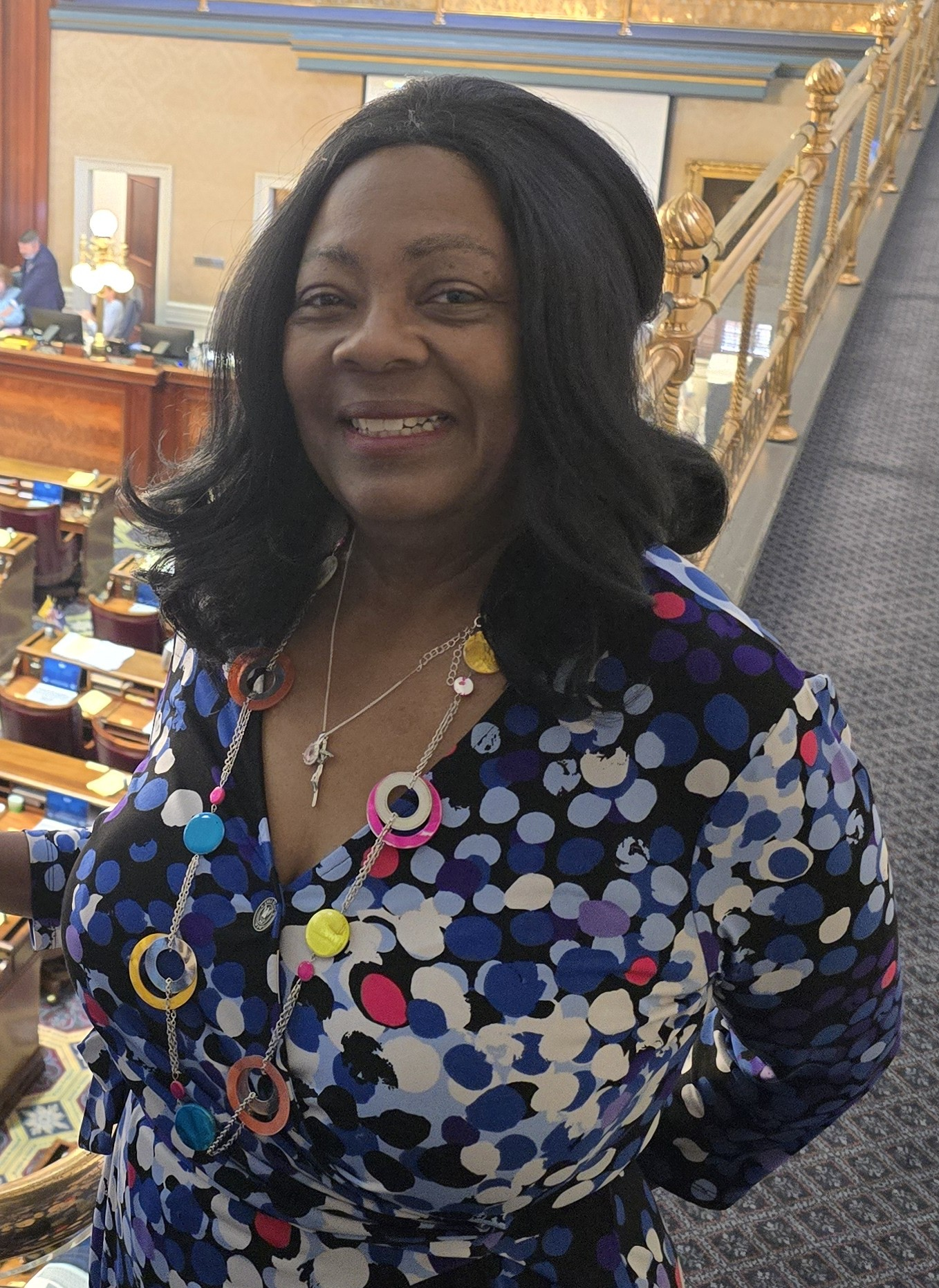
- Fleming Bruce in 2025

Personal details
- Born: December 3, 1961 (age 64) Fort Campbell, Kentucky, U.S.
- Party: Democratic
- Education: Agnes Scott College (BA); University of South Carolina (MA)

Catherine Fleming Bruce (born December 3, 1961) is an American author, preservationist, and activist from South Carolina. She is a member of the Democratic Party. Fleming Bruce received the most votes in the Democratic primary for the 2022 United States Senate election in South Carolina, losing in a runoff. On November 5, 2025, Fleming Bruce formally announced her 2026 campaign for US Senate. She ran as a write-in candidate in the 2026 United States Senate election general election.

== Early life and education ==
Catherine Fleming Bruce was born in Kentucky and later moved to Columbia, South Carolina, where she was raised. Fleming Bruce received her bachelor's degree from Agnes Scott College in Decatur, Georgia, and her master's degree in Journalism and Mass Communication from the University of South Carolina in Columbia. Fleming Bruce is the daughter of Emma Fleming and the late Louis Fleming, who served as Chairman of Sumter County Council.

== Political activism ==
Fleming Bruce has advocated in coalition with other local and state chapters of national advocacy groups and community based groups. She has been active in the preservation of Richland County historic sites in connection to local leaders active during the Civil Rights Movement and World War II. In 1995, Fleming Bruce founded the Collaborative for Community Trust, which by 2000 was a "small group made up of mostly educators who are committed to social change." The group bought the home of activist Modjeska Simkins in downtown Columbia so that it could be used as a human rights center and the group's offices after historic restoration. Scholars noted in 2021 that Richland County has more monuments to Black women than any other county in the United States.

During the preservation of the Modjeska Monteith Simkins House, Fleming Bruce worked with Matthew J. Bruccoli, co-owner of the Bruccoli Clark Laymon publishing company along with Richard Laymon, to have a portrait of Simkins created directly from the glass negative plates found under the Richard Samuel Roberts house in Columbia. Bruccoli Clark Laymon had published A True Likeness: The Black South of Richard Samuel Roberts 1920-1936, in 1986. The book contained photographs, including the photo of Simkins, from glass negatives discovered through the work of University of South Carolina South Caroliniana Library field archivist Thomas L. Johnson with the cooperation of the Roberts family. A True Likeness won Johnson and co-author Philip C. Dunn the 1987 Lillian Smith Book Award. The portrait was displayed in the Simkins House.

In the aftermath of the 2014 deadly Christmas Eve EF3 tornado in Columbia, Mississippi, and the 1000-year flood that struck Columbia, South Carolina, the year afterward. Fleming Bruce highlighted historic ties between the two cities and participated in joint relief efforts that connected them as sister cities.

== Political career ==
Fleming Bruce has served as Director of Operations for the Richland County Democratic Party, a division of the South Carolina Democratic Party.

=== State Grand Jury investigation of legislators ===
In 2016, Fleming Bruce was appointed as foreman to the State Grand Jury for the South Carolina Statehouse corruption investigation, led by David Pascoe with judicial oversight by Clifton Newman. Fleming Bruce served as spokesman for the State Grand Jury during the proceedings and was responsible for signing and presenting indictments and verdicts of South Carolina legislators to the court on the jury’s behalf.

== 2022 US Senate campaign ==
On January 17, 2022—Martin Luther King Jr. Day—Fleming Bruce announced her candidacy for South Carolina’s Class 3 seat in the United States Senate, challenging incumbent Tim Scott. Fleming Bruce received the most votes in the June 14 Democratic primary against two opponents, but because South Carolina law requires a candidate to win a majority, a June 28 runoff was held. She ultimately did not secure the nomination, and the eventual Democratic nominee was defeated by Scott in the general election.

== 2026 US Senate campaign ==
In July 2022, Fleming Bruce filed FEC paperwork to run in the 2026 election for South Carolina's Class 2 seat in the United States Senate against Republican incumbent Lindsey Graham. On November 5, 2025 she formally announced her campaign.

Fleming Bruce was noted in national press as one of several Black women running for US Senate in 2026 alongside Juliana Stratton of Illinois and Pamela Stevenson of Kentucky.

== Publications and culture work ==
Her writings focus on culture and social justice. Published scholarship includes The Globalization-friendly global public sphere: contrasting paths to moral legitimacy and accountability, a chapter that appeared in the 2011 book, Public Sphere Reconsidered: Theories and Practices.

Fleming Bruce's 1992 documentary, A Perfect Equality: Conflicts And Achievements of Historic Black Columbia, was broadcast on South Carolina Educational Television. The 90-minute documentary is divided into four parts, each covering an era of Black history between 1786 until 1990, and contains narration, archival photographs, and interviews. The State staff writer Pat Berman wrote that in the documentary, "[Fleming] Bruce focuses on what [black people] have achieved in Columbia and what strategies have been devised to deal with the racism that not only impedes progress but also denies the humanity of others". She also produced a guide to places in Richland County important to Black history that was described by The State in 1995 as a "ground-breaking guide to Columbia's black history".

In 2014, Fleming Bruce collaborated with local organizations to hold a Chester, South Carolina celebration of the filming of Emmy-nominated television miniseries Chiefs, based on the New York Times best-seller Chiefs, by Stuart Woods. The Chester News and Reporter newspaper reprinted coverage of Woods' participation on the occasion of his death in 2022.

Fleming Bruce is the author of The Sustainers: Being, Building and Doing Good through Activism in the Sacred Spaces of Civil Rights, Human Rights and Social Movements. She became the first African American to win the University of Mary Washington Center for Historic Preservation Book Prize in 2017. The book received significant attention in the field, and has amplified national scholarly and professional discussion on social justice, inclusion, diversity and anti-racism in the practice of preservation, by such groups as Urban Heritage, Sustainability, and Social Inclusion project of the Columbia Climate School Center for Sustainable Urban Development, as well as connections between preservation, activism and social justice.

In 2021, an article by Fleming Bruce, "A Lion Tells Her Own Story: Civil Rights Buildings in South Carolina”, was published in C20: The Magazine of the Twentieth Century Society, a United Kingdom - based publication.

On September 2, 2025, Fleming Bruce organized an observance of the 80th Anniversary of the End of World War II - dignitaries participating included WWII veterans, South Carolina State Representatives Lonnie Hosey and Doug Gilliam, chair of the House Military Caucus; South Carolina Senator Jeffrey R. Graham; Major General (Ret.) Todd B. McCaffrey, South Carolina Secretary of Veterans' Affairs; historian Vernon Burton, and preservationist Michael Bedenbaugh. Activities included wreath layings at the Columbia Peace Pole in the Congaree Vista and at monuments to the USS Columbia (CL-56), to victims of the Holocaust and the attack on Pearl Harbor and other World War II monuments at Memorial Park.

== Bibliography ==
- Fleming Bruce, Catherine. The Sustainers: Being, Building and Doing Good through Activism in the Sacred Spaces of Civil Rights, Human Rights and Social Movements. Charleston: Tnovsa (October 12, 2019); ISBN 978-0-9962190-6-8
- Fleming Bruce, Catherine. "The Globalization-friendly Global Public Sphere: contrasting paths to moral legitimacy and accountability." in Public Sphere Reconsidered: Theories and practices. João Carlos Correia and Rousiley C. Maia. LabCom Books, 2011. SN - 978-989-654-082
- Wells, Jeremy. (2021). "10 Ways Historic Preservation Policy Supports White Supremacy and 10 Ideas to End It." University of Maryland faculty papers.

== See also ==
- Black women in American politics
- List of African-American United States Senate candidates
- Historic Preservation
- Timeline of African-American firsts
