= Swimming to Catalina =

1998 book by Stuart Woods

- First edition
- Author: Stuart Woods
- Language: English
- Series: Stone Barrington
- Genre: Suspense/thriller novel
- Publisher: HarperCollins(Hardcover, 1998); HarperTorch (Paperback, 1998 & 2002); Harper Premium (Paperback, 2009)
- Publication date: September 1996
- Publication place: United States
- Media type: Print (Paperback)
- Pages: 448 pp
- ISBN: 0-06-171193-4
- Preceded by: Dead in the Water
- Followed by: Worst Fears Realized

Swimming to Catalina is a novel by Stuart Woods, first published in 1998 by HarperCollins. The novel takes place in Los Angeles, after the events in Dead in the Water. The novel continues the story of Stone Barrington, a retired detective turned lawyer/private investigator.
