= Stuart Woods =

American novelist (1938–2022)

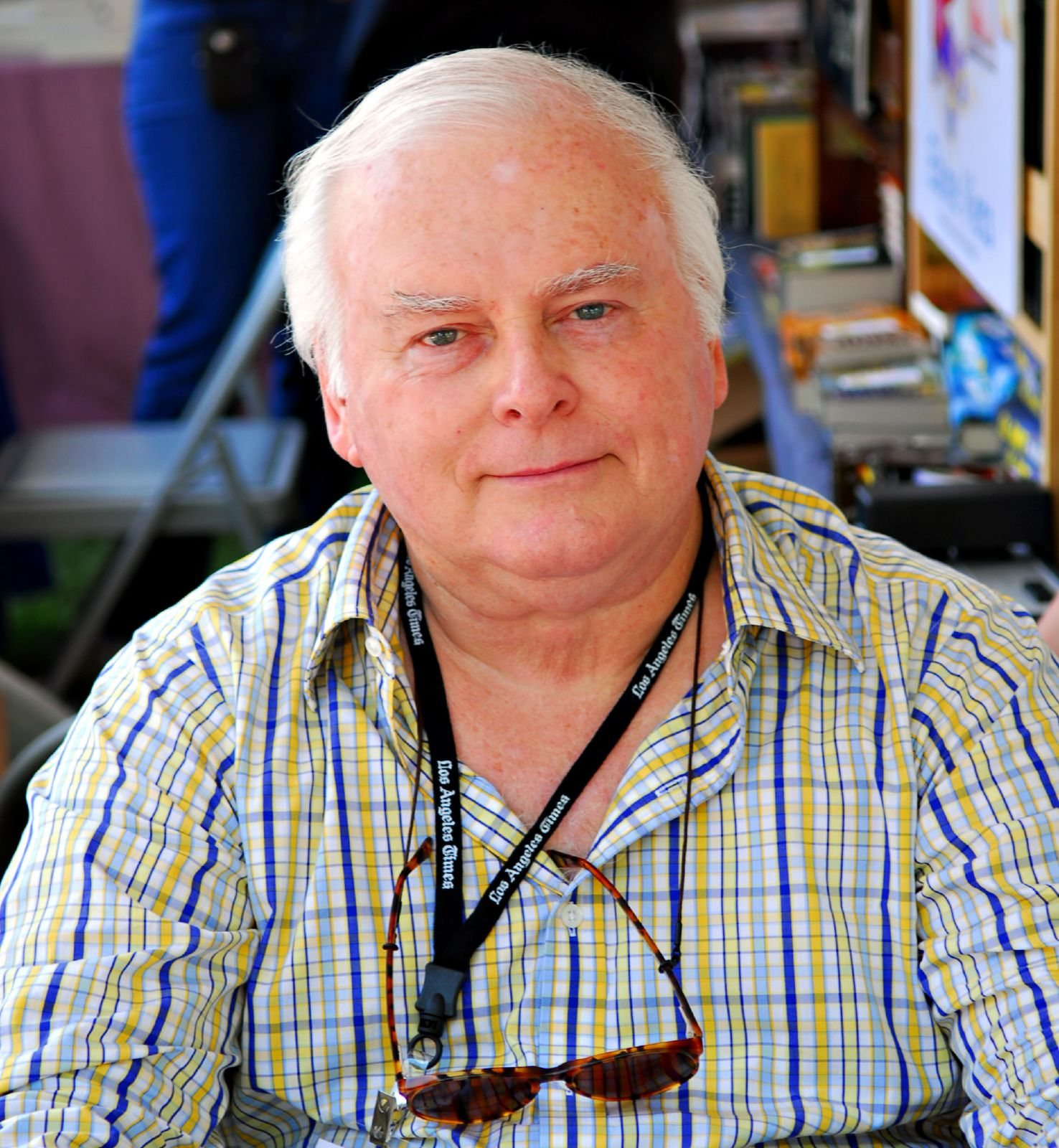
- Woods at the Los Angeles Times Festival of Books in 2008
- Born: January 9, 1938; Manchester, Georgia, U.S.
- Died: July 22, 2022 (aged 84); Washington, Connecticut, U.S.
- Education: University of Georgia (BA)
- Occupation: Novelist
- Spouse: Jeanmarie Cooper
- Writing career
- Period: 1977–2022
- Website: www.stuartwoods.com

Stuart Woods (born Stuart Chevalier Lee; January 9, 1938 – July 22, 2022) was an American novelist, known best for his first novel Chiefs and his series of novels featuring protagonist Stone Barrington.

Woods was a Georgia native, entered the advertising business after college graduation and lived in England and Ireland for almost a decade. He became an accomplished and competitive sailor. His interest in this pastime and his need for financing it provided the incentive to write for publication.

Woods’ initial literary efforts focused on sailing and expanded to include reviews of numerous British restaurants, inns and hotels. His seminal work Chiefs, inspired by his grandfather, a police chief, was adapted for television. Woods’ prolific Barrington series features the detective-lawyer, aided by a recurring cast of supporting characters, who handles lucrative cases which his law firm otherwise would rather not be associated with.

Woods broadened his pastimes to include piloting and yachting, and maintained residences in several states.

== Early life ==
Stuart Woods was born in Manchester, Georgia, and graduated in 1959 from the University of Georgia, with a Bachelor of Arts in sociology. After graduation, he enrolled in the Air National Guard, spending two months in basic training before moving to New York City, where he began a career in the advertising industry. Towards the end of the 1960s, Woods emigrated to England and lived in Knightsbridge, London while continuing to work in advertising. After three years in London, Woods decided to write a novel, based on an old family story that had been told to him when he was a child, and moved to Ireland. He moved into a converted barn on the grounds of Lough Cutra Castle near Gort, County Galway, and lived a near-solitary existence, except for spending two days a week in Dublin writing television commercials and print advertisements.

== Sailing ==
Soon after settling in Ireland in 1973, Woods took up a new hobby of sailing, an activity that had interested him since the summer of 1966 in Castine, Maine, when friends had taken him on their boat.

In the fall of 1974, Woods's grandfather died and bequeathed him enough money to buy a yacht suitable for the race. To finance his hobby, Woods met with publishers about writing a book about his experience in the OSTAR, organized sponsorship for the races, and sent invitations and press releases about the launch of his yacht to the local and national Irish media, RTÉ, The Observer, and Yachting Monthly.

== Becoming a published writer ==
Woods wrote an account of his OSTAR experience, and was introduced to Stanford Maritime, a London-based publishing house specializing in nautical books, by Ron Holland. Blue Water, Green Skipper was published in 1977. The American publishing rights were sold to W.W. Norton.

Woods' second book was to be written about the 1977 Round Britain Yacht Race, but the book was cancelled because of light winds and calms during the race. He persuaded his publishers to allow him to change the scope of the book, and spent the summer driving 12,000 miles around Great Britain and Ireland, writing a guidebook to country restaurants, inns, and hotels. He visited over 150 establishments, and included 138 in the book; 91 establishments in England, 13 in Scotland, eight in Wales, and 26 in Ireland. The two places in the British Isles that he did not visit were Northern Ireland, saying that he did not feel comfortable recommending any place where he was afraid to visit, and the Channel Islands due to a lack of available time. Originally titled A Lover's Guide to the Country Inns of Britain and Ireland Woods realised married couples may feel alienated, and changed it to A Romantic's Guide ..., defining a "romantic" as a person " who is susceptible to charm" in addition to The Concise Oxford Dictionary's definition of someone "given to romance, imagination ... visionary ... professing grandeur of picturesqueness or passion or irregular beauty to finish and proportion."

=== The novel Chiefs and its television adaptation ===
Woods' first novel, Chiefs, was published in March 1981. The story was inspired by a police chief's badge Woods had found in his grandmother's home. The badge was stained with blood and pockmarked by buckshot. It had belonged to his grandfather, who died wearing it 10 years before Woods was born. He submitted the first 100 pages and an outline to three publishers, all of whom turned him down, before W. W. Norton bought the publishing rights for $7,500. He later stated it was a mistake to sell the book unfinished, as he could have gotten much more money had it been completed. About 20,000 copies of the book were printed in hardback, but Norton did little to promote it. Woods contracted with Bantam Books to print the paperback edition.

In 1983, Chiefs was adapted into a television miniseries of the same name, starring Charlton Heston, Danny Glover, Billy Dee Williams, Keith Carradine, Brad Davis, Stephen Collins, Paul Sorvino, Lane Smith, Paula Kelly and John Goodman, with production filming taking place in Chester, South Carolina. CBS broadcast the miniseries over three nights, and it was nominated for three Emmy Awards and one Eddie Award. Its success sparked interest in the paperback, and Woods was awarded the Edgar Award in the "Best First Novel" category from the Mystery Writers of America.

In 2014, a celebration of the filming of Chiefs was organized in Chester by Catherine Fleming Bruce in collaboration with local organizations. Woods was among the presenters.

The Chester newspaper reprinted coverage of Woods' visit to the city on the occasion of his death in 2022.

=== Other works ===
Woods' most prolific series of novels focus on Stone Barrington, a former NYPD detective turned lawyer, who is of counsel to a prestigious law firm and handles sensitive cases for the firm's prominent clients, but cases with which the firm nonetheless does not wish to be publicly associated. As such, Barrington commands exorbitant fees, and a strong cast of recurring characters such as his ex-partner Dino Bacchetti, frequent use of the restaurant Elaine's on the Upper East Side of Manhattan in New York City as a setting, and Stone's frequent exploits with women, travel, and fine dining. Stone, like Woods, was also an experienced pilot and frequent references are made to his aircraft.

In addition to Stone, Woods authored several other character-focused series, including Holly Barker, a retired Army major and Florida police chief recruited to become a CIA operative; Ed Eagle, a Santa Fe defense lawyer; William Henry Lee IV, a United States senator from Georgia who is elected President of the United States; and Rick Barron, a police detective who becomes a security officer and later chief of production for a Hollywood movie studio in the 1930s. All of Woods' novels take place in the same universe, and characters frequently appear in other series.

Woods published a memoir, a travel book, and 44 novels in a 37-year career, and had 29 consecutive The New York Times best sellers in hardback. Two completed novels were awaiting publication in January and April, 2011, and he then signed another three-book deal with Putnam. At one time in his literary output, Woods wrote two novels a year and subsequently increased that to three novels a year, at the request of his publishers. In 2014, he started publishing four times a year, in January, April, June/July, and October.

== Personal life ==
Woods was a licensed, instrument-rated private pilot and bought a new Cessna Citation Mustang, his first jet airplane. He was the launch customer of the Cessna Citation M2, taking delivery of the plane in December 2013. He owned a Hinckley T38 R power boat and was a partner in an 85-foot antique motor yacht, Enticer, built in 1935 and fully restored. Married to Jeanmarie (née Cooper) in January 2013, the couple lived with a Labrador retriever named Fred in Key West, Florida, on Mount Desert Island, in Maine, and Santa Fe, New Mexico.

== Published works ==
=== Will Lee novels ===
1. Chiefs (1981) (Won 1982 Edgar Allan Poe Award for Best First Novel. Made into a five-hour TV miniseries, starring Charlton Heston, John Goodman and an all-star cast. Woods has a role in the miniseries)
2. Run Before the Wind (1983)
3. Deep Lie (1986)
4. Grass Roots (1989) (Made into a four-hour TV miniseries, starring Corbin Bernsen and Mel Harris)
5. The Run (2000)
6. Capital Crimes (2003) (First appearance of Teddy Fay)
7. Mounting Fears (2009) (With Holly Barker. Teddy Fay appearance #4)

=== Stone Barrington novels ===
1. New York Dead (1991)
2. Dirt (1996)
3. Dead in the Water (1997)
4. Swimming to Catalina (1998)
5. Worst Fears Realized (1999)
6. L.A. Dead (2000)
7. Cold Paradise (2001)
8. The Short Forever (2002) (First appearance of CIA agent Lance Cabot)
9. Dirty Work (2003) (First appearance of Herbie Fisher)
10. Reckless Abandon (2004) (With Holly Barker, Lance Cabot, and Ed Eagle. Cameo by Herbie Fisher. Continuation of a storyline in Blood Orchid)
11. Two Dollar Bill (2005)
12. Dark Harbor (2006) (With Holly Barker)
13. Fresh Disasters (2007) (Herbie Fisher appearance)
14. Shoot Him If He Runs (2007) (With Holly Barker. Teddy Fay appearance #3)
15. Hot Mahogany (2008) (With Holly Barker)
16. Loitering With Intent (2009) (Cameo by Chuck Chandler from Choke)
17. Kisser (2010)
18. Lucid Intervals (2010) (First appearance of Strategic Services and Mike Freeman)
19. Strategic Moves (2011) (With Holly Barker. Cameos by Todd Bacon and Lance Cabot)
20. Bel-Air Dead (2011) (Cameos by Ed Eagle, Barbara Eagle and Rick Barron)
21. Son of Stone (2011)
22. D.C. Dead (2011) (With Holly Barker and Will Lee. Teddy Fay appearance #7)
23. Unnatural Acts (2012) (With Herbie Fisher)
24. Severe Clear (2012) (With Holly Barker and Will Lee)
25. Collateral Damage (2013) (With Holly Barker and Will Lee. Continuation of storyline in Severe Clear)
26. Unintended Consequences (2013) (With Holly Barker and Lance Cabot. Timeline starts immediately following events in Collateral Damage. References events in Deep Lie)
27. Doing Hard Time (2013) (Teddy Fay appearance #8. Continuation of storyline in Unintended Consequences)
28. Standup Guy (2014) (First appearance of John Fratelli aka Jack Coulter)
29. Carnal Curiosity (2014) (With Jack Coulter. Cameos by Holly Barker, Lance Cabot, Teddy Fay, Will Lee and Kate Lee)
30. Cut and Thrust (2014) (With Will Lee, Kate Lee, Ed Eagle, Barbara Eagle and Teddy Fay)
31. Paris Match (2014) (With Lance Cabot and Holly Barker. Continuation of storyline in Doing Hard Time)
32. Insatiable Appetites (2015) (Cameos by Will Lee and Kate Lee)
33. Hot Pursuit (2015) (With Holly Barker, Lance Cabot, Will Lee and Kate Lee)
34. Naked Greed (2015) (Cameo by Holly Barker)
35. Foreign Affairs (2015) (Cameos by Holly Barker, Kate Lee, and Lance Cabot)
36. Scandalous Behavior (2016) (With Teddy Fay [Billy Barnett]. Continuation of Foreign Affairs)
37. Family Jewels (2016) (Cameos by Ed Eagle, Kate Lee, Will Lee, Lance Cabot, and Holly Barker)
38. Dishonorable Intentions (2016) (With Teddy Fay [Billy Barnett]. Cameos by Ed Eagle, Kate Lee, Lance Cabot, and Holly Barker)
39. Sex, Lies, and Serious Money (2016) (With Herb Fisher. Cameos by Ed Eagle, Holly Barker and Teddy Fay [Billy Barnett])
40. Below the Belt (2017) (With Holly Barker, Lance Cabot, Will Lee. Cameo by Kate Lee)
41. Fast and Loose (2017) (Cameos by Teddy Fay [Billy Barnett], Kate Lee, Will Lee, Lance Cabot and Holly Barker. Continuation of Below the Belt)
42. Indecent Exposure (2017) (With Holly Barker, Will Lee, and Kate Lee)
43. Quick & Dirty (2017) (Cameo by Holly Barker)
44. Unbound (2018) (With Teddy Fay [Billy Barnett]. Cameo by Ed Eagle)
45. Shoot First (Think Later) (2018) (Cameos by Lance Cabot and Holly Barker)
46. Turbulence (2018) (With Holly Barker and Lance Cabot. Continuation of Shoot First)
47. Desperate Measures (2018) (With Herbie Fisher)
48. A Delicate Touch (2018) (Cameo by Holly Barker)
49. Wild Card (2019) (Cameos by Holly Barker and Lance Cabot. Continuation of A Delicate Touch)
50. Contraband (2019) (Cameo by Holly Barker)
51. Stealth (2019) (With Holly Barker and Lance Cabot)
52. Treason (2020) (With Holly Barker and Lance Cabot)
53. Hit List (2020) (With Lance Cabot, Ed Eagle, Herbie Fisher and Holly Barker)
54. Choppy Water (2020) (Cameos by Lance Cabot, Kate Lee and Will Lee)
55. Shakeup (2020) (With Holly Barker. Cameos by Kate Lee, Will Lee, Lance Cabot, and Herbie Fisher)
56. Hush-Hush (2020) (With Lance Cabot. Cameo by Holly Barker)
57. Double Jeopardy (2021) (With Lance Cabot)
58. Class Act (2021) (With Jack Coulter. Cameo by Holly Barker)
59. Foul Play (2021) (Cameos by Holly Barker and Lance Cabot)
60. Criminal Mischief (2021) (Cameos by Holly Barker and Lance Cabot)
61. A Safe House (2022) (With Lance Cabot)
62. Black Dog (2022)
63. Distant Thunder (2022) (With Lance Cabot. Cameo by Holly Barker)
64. Near Miss (with Brett Battles) (2023) (With Teddy Fay [Billy Barnett])

==== Stone Barrington novels not by Stuart Woods ====
Note: The following titles are not written by Stuart Woods. They continue to develop the story lines created by Woods.

- 65. Smolder (by Brett Battles) (2024) (With Teddy Fay [Billy Barnett]. Cameos by Will Lee, Kate Lee, Holly Barker, Ed Eagle and Lance Cabot.)
- 66. Finders Keepers (by Brett Battles) (2025) (With Jack Coulter)

=== Holly Barker novels ===
1. Orchid Beach (1998) (Set in the fictional town of Orchid Beach, Florida)
2. Orchid Blues (2001) (Cameo by Stone Barrington)
3. Blood Orchid (2002)
4. Iron Orchid (2005) (Teddy Fay appearance #2)
5. Hothouse Orchid (2009) (Teddy Fay appearance #5)

=== Ed Eagle novels ===
1. Santa Fe Rules (1992) (Set in Santa Fe, New Mexico)
2. Short Straw (2006) (Cameo by Rick Barron)
3. Santa Fe Dead (2008)
4. Santa Fe Edge (2010) (Teddy Fay appearance #6. Cameos by Holly Barker and Agent Todd Bacon from Mounting Fears)

=== Rick Barron novels ===
1. The Prince of Beverly Hills (2004)
2. Beverly Hills Dead (2008) (Cameo by Stone Barrington)

=== Teddy Fay novels ===
Note: These novels also feature Stone Barrington.

1. Smooth Operator (with Parnell Hall) (2016)
2. The Money Shot (with Parnell Hall) (2018)
3. Skin Game (with Parnell Hall) (2019)
4. Bombshell (with Parnell Hall) (2020)
5. Jackpot (with Bryon Quertermous) (2021)
6. Obsession (with Brett Battles) (2023)

==== Teddy Fay novels not by Stuart Woods ====
Note: The following titles are not written by Stuart Woods. They continue to develop the storylines created by Woods.

- 7. Golden Hour (by Brett Battles) (2024)
- 8. Blown Away (by Brett Battles) (2025)

=== Herbie Fisher novels ===
1. Barely Legal (with Parnell Hall) (2017) (With Stone Barrington)

=== Stand-alone novels ===
- Under the Lake (1987)
- White Cargo (1988)
- Palindrome (1991) (Set on Cumberland Island, Georgia)
- L.A. Times (1993) (Set in Los Angeles, California)
- Dead Eyes (1994) (Set in Los Angeles, California)
- Heat (1994) (Set in a fictional town in Idaho)
- Imperfect Strangers (1995) (Winner of 1997 Grand Prix de Littérature Policière)
- Choke (1995)

=== Non-fiction ===
- Blue Water, Green Skipper: A Memoir of Sailing Alone Across the Atlantic (1977)
- A Romantic's Guide to the Country Inns of Britain and Ireland (1979)
- An Extravagant Life (2022)

== Book reviews ==
Unintended Consequences

- New York Journal of Books reviewer Carolyn Haley called Unintended Consequences ". . . reliably fun and intriguing."
