= Capital Crimes =

Book by Stuart Woods

- First edition
- Author: Stuart Woods
- Language: English
- Series: Will Lee Novels
- Genre: Thriller novel
- Publisher: Putnam
- Publication date: October 2003
- Publication place: United States
- Media type: Print (Paperback)
- Pages: 386 pp
- ISBN: 0-451-21156-1
- OCLC: 54883305
- Preceded by: The Run
- Followed by: Mounting Fears

Capital Crimes is the sixth novel in the Will Lee series by Stuart Woods. It was first published in 2003 by Putnam Publishing. The novel takes place in Washington D. C., a couple of years after the events in The Run. The novel continues the story of the Lee family of Delano, Georgia. It is also the first appearance of recurring villain Teddy Faye.

== Plot summary ==
In Capital Crimes, Will Lee finds himself in the middle of a tangled web of intrigue and danger, politics and power. Now at the pinnacle of his career, serving as president of the United States, Lee is faced with a most unusual task - that of marshaling federal law enforcement agencies to catch an assassin who is picking off some of the nation's high-level politicos. When a prominent conservative politician with a shady reputation is expertly killed at his lakeside cabin, authorities can come up with no suspects and even less hard evidence. But then, within days, two other, seemingly isolated deaths (achieved by very different means) are feared linked to the same ruthless murderer. With the help of his CIA director wife, Kate Rule Lee, Will trails the most clever and professional of killers before he can strike again. From a quiet D.C. suburb to the corridors of power to a deserted island hideaway, Will, Kate, and maverick FBI agent Robert Kinney track their man and set a trap with extreme caution and care-and await the most dangerous kind of quarry, a killer with a cause to die for.
