= Dead in the Water (Woods novel) =

1997 novel by Stuart Woods

- First edition
- Author: Stuart Woods
- Language: English
- Series: Stone Barrington
- Genre: Suspense/thriller novel
- Publisher: HarperCollins(Hardcover, 1997); HarperTorch (Paperback, 1998 & 2001); Harper Premium (Paperback, 2009)
- Publication date: August 1997
- Publication place: United States
- Media type: Print (Paperback)
- Pages: 464 pp
- ISBN: 0-06-171191-8
- Preceded by: Dirt
- Followed by: Swimming to Catalina

Dead in the Water is a 1997 novel by author Stuart Woods. It is the third novel in the Stone Barrington series. It belongs to the Thriller and Mystery genre.

It takes place after the events in Dirt, on the island of St. Marks. The main protagonists of the novel are Stone Barrington, a retired detective turned lawyer/private investigator, and Allison Manning, a young woman accused of murder.

== Plot ==
Stone Barrington, once a police officer, now an up-and-coming lawyer, goes on a short vacation to escape his hectic life in New York City. He sets his sights on a romantic getaway to the islands of St. Marks, where his beau, Arrington Carter, a high-profile host and interviewer, is to join him the next day.

Stone's plan for a romantic boat cruise is ruined by three events. First, the weather, with snowfall at every available airport. Second, the saddening ambition of Carter, who cancels on him. Lastly, a gorgeous woman, Allison Manning, who is facing trial for murdering her husband and disposing off his body at sea. In New York, a conviction for murder may lead to capital punishment.

Racing to prove the young widow innocent of any wrongdoing pits Stone against a determined protector standing on the verge of becoming the next Prime Minister of St. Marks. While hoping he doesn't lose the new love of his life to his own newfound ambition, Stone uses every skill in his possession to protect his client.
