= Jerry London =

American television director and producer

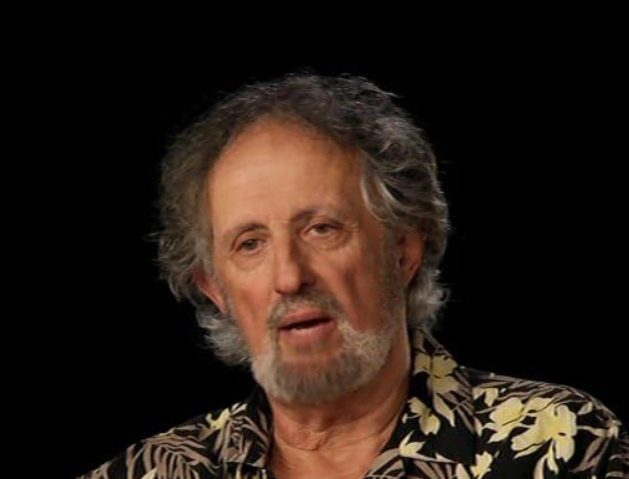
- Born: January 21, 1937 (age 89); Los Angeles, California
- Other names: Jerome London; Jerome R. London
- Occupations: Television director and producer
- Years active: 1968-present
- Spouse: Marilynn Landau since June 15, 1958
- Children: Todd London and Lisa London

Jerry London (born January 21, 1937) is an American television director and producer.

== Life and career ==
London has directed more than forty television movies, including the Emmy Award nominated Chiefs.

London won best director for James Clavell's Shōgun, a nine-hour miniseries for NBC, and has also directed ten other miniseries, including the acclaimed The Scarlet and the Black with Gregory Peck, Chiefs with Charlton Heston, and Ellis Island with Richard Burton. He has taught film production at UCLA and Los Angeles Film School.

London is the father of Todd London and Lisa London. The former is a TV producer of HBO's Rome and The Pacific, and a senior vice president and post-production executive of Walt Disney Pictures.

== Filmography ==
- Killdozer! (1974)
- Ma and Pa (1974)
- Goodnight Jackie (1974)
- Just by Accident (Rockford Files) (1975)
- The World of Darkness (1977)
- Cover Girls (1977)
- Wheels (1978)
- Escapade (1978)
- Evening in Byzantium (1978)
- Women in White (1979)
- Swan Song (1980)
- Shōgun (1980)
- Father Figure (1980)
- Chicago Story (1981 pilot TV movie)
- The Ordeal of Bill Carney (1981)
- The Gift of Life (1982)
- The Scarlet and the Black (1983)
- Chiefs (1983)
- Ellis Island (1984)
- If Tomorrow Comes (1986)
- Dark Mansions (1986)
- Manhunt for Claude Dallas (1986)
- Harry's Hong Kong (1987)
- Rent-a-Cop (1987)
- Dadah Is Death (1988)
- Kiss Shot (1989)
- The Haunting of Sarah Hardy (1989)
- A Season of Giants (1990)
- Vestige of Honor (1990)
- Victim of Love (1991)
- Grass Roots (1992)
- Calendar Girl, Cop, Killer? The Bambi Bembenek Story (1992)
- A Twist of the Knife (1993)
- Labor of Love: The Arlette Schweitzer Story (1993)
- The Cosby Mysteries (1994 pilot film)
- I Spy Returns (1994)
- A Mother's Gift (1995)
- A Promise to Carolyn (1996)
- A Holiday for Love (1996)
- Stolen Women, Captured Hearts (1997)
- Get to the Heart: The Barbara Mandrell Story (1997)
- I'll Be Home for Christmas (1997)
- Beauty (1998)
- As Time Runs Out (1999)
- Take Me Home: The John Denver Story (2000)
- Dr. Quinn, Medicine Woman: The Heart Within (2001)
- Counterstrike (2002)
