= Mounting Fears =

Book by Stuart Woods

- First edition
- Author: Stuart Woods
- Language: English
- Series: Will Lee novels
- Genre: Suspense, thriller novel
- Publisher: Putnam
- Publication date: January 2009
- Publication place: United States
- Media type: Print (Paperback)
- Pages: 304 pp (Hardcover); 384 pp (Paperback)
- ISBN: 978-0-06-101422-2
- OCLC: 63791379
- Preceded by: Capital Crimes

Mounting Fears is the seventh novel in the Will Lee series by Stuart Woods. It was first published in 2009 by Putnam. The novel takes place in Washington D.C. and other states, some years after the events of Capital Crimes. The book continues the story of the Lee family of Delano, Georgia. Will Lee is now the President of the United States. It is also the fourth appearance of recurring villain Teddy Faye. The novel is also a New York Times bestseller.

== Critical reception ==
Jon Land of the Providence Journal felt that, while the novel didn't stack up to other novelists' works in the genre, it still "never ceases to entertain".
