= Chiefs (novel) =

Book by Stuart Woods

- First edition cover
- Author: Stuart Woods
- Language: English
- Genre: Thriller
- Publisher: Norton
- Publication date: June 1981
- Publication place: United States
- Media type: Print (paperback)
- Pages: 432 pp
- Followed by: Run Before the Wind

Chiefs is the first novel in the Will Lee series by Stuart Woods. It was first published in 1981 by W. W. Norton & Company. The novel takes place in the fictional town of Delano, Georgia, over three generations, as three different police chiefs attempt to identify a serial killer operating in the area. It is Woods' first published novel. As the author explains in a note, it was inspired by the story of his grandfather's death while serving as a police chief. Chiefs was made available in e-book format on January 23, 2012.

== Plot summary ==
The first chief: Will Henry Lee:

The novel opens in 1919, when the growing town of Delano, Georgia, hires its first police chief. The city council, led by banker and prominent investor Hugh Holmes, chooses farmer Will Henry Lee over Foxy Funderburke, an eccentric, wealthy dog breeder and gun collector, for the job. Will Henry is unschooled as a policeman but is honest and determined to do the job well. Not long after he assumes his new responsibilities, the dead body of a young man is found naked at the bottom of a cliff. A medical examination concludes that the boy died from a broken neck as a result of his fall but also that he had been tortured—cuffed and beaten with a rubber hose—for some time before his death. The medical examiner tells Will Henry that the crime had a strong sexual component, and that while the boy had not yet been sodomized, the assault on him could have gone further had the boy not evidently escaped.

Will Henry conducts a thorough investigation but is frustrated in his attempts to locate the killer, not least because the uncooperative Skeeter Willis, the sheriff of Meriwether County, of which Delano is a part, insists that the boy was killed by some of the many transients in the area at the time. Will Henry is unconvinced, but eventually runs out of leads. He believes that a second murder, taking place some four years later and just outside his jurisdiction, is connected to the first but has no real proof and no real authority to pursue the matter.

Finally, Will Henry hears from Skeeter Willis about a young runaway who might be passing near Delano and also learns that someone with a Delano PO Box had attempted to purchase a pair of handcuffs from a police supplier. The box belongs to Foxy Funderburke, whom Will Henry had questioned after the two murders, since the bodies were discovered near Foxy's property. Other clues also point in Foxy's direction. Looking around Foxy's property, Will Henry notices the outline of what appears to be a freshly dug grave but, unbeknownst to him, he has been seen by Foxy. As he rushes to obtain a search warrant, Foxy follows, intending to kill him, and so is nearby when Will, diverted by a problem involving the Coles, a black family that had once worked for him, is shot and killed by the black father, who is in the grip of a malaria-induced delirium. Will Henry dies as the shooter's teenage son, Willie, is escaping to relatives in another town.

The second chief: Sonny Butts:

The scene shifts to 1946. After World War II, Delano welcomes home its returning veterans, including Billy Lee, the late chief's son, a young lawyer who served as a bomber pilot in Europe, and Sonny Butts, a decorated Army infantryman. Billy has become a protégé of Hugh Holmes and the two men decide to launch Billy into politics by having him run for Holmes's seat in the Georgia State Senate, from which the banker intends to retire. Sonny lands a position on the Delano police force, which now consists of a chief and two officers. He is a quick success as a police officer, but rumors of abuses at the police station are heard. When the chief dies, Sonny is named his replacement.

Examining old police files, Sonny comes across Chief Lee's notes on the two murders in the 1920s. He also begins to track the last known sightings of a number of young men, likely runaways, in the years since and notices a geographical pattern in the disappearances: Delano is at their center. Seeing in Will Henry's notes a reference to interviewing Foxy Funderburke, Sonny decides to keep an eye on Foxy as a possible suspect.

Sonny is undone by his virulent racism and propensity to violence. After he beats and kills a local black businessman, a grand jury is empaneled for the purpose of indicting him, though perjured testimony lets him off the hook. But Sonny was also observed beating a man at the county fair the evening before, and Hugh Holmes is determined to fire him. Desperate to hang onto his job, Sonny heads to Foxy's property after getting a tip on a missing person, and catches Foxy digging a fresh grave for a recent victim. Momentarily distracted by the chance to save his reputation, Sonny is attacked by Foxy, who shoots him and buries him in the new grave with his police motorcycle.

The third chief: Tucker Watts:

The time frame changes once again, this time to 1963. Billy Lee is now Georgia's lieutenant governor and is planning to run for governor in the next election. Hugh Holmes asks Billy's help in searching for a new chief, who will now supervise six officers. An integrationist, Billy is alerted to the résumé of Major Tucker Watts, a retiring Army MP, who is black. Mindful that Delano has yet to hire a black officer, let alone a chief, Billy decides to forward Watts's résumé to Holmes and recommends his hiring. Holmes makes a persuasive case at the city council hearing and Watts is hired as chief, setting off a media frenzy over the first black hired to head a police force in the South.

Tucker assumes his duties as chief welcomed by many residents but scorned by others. He makes a good impression on the overall community, however, and at first seems able to weather the problems he faces. But Tucker harbors a painful secret: He is in fact Willie Cole, whose father killed Chief Lee decades earlier and who, so far as Delano knows, died in an accident not long after fleeing. Tucker is deathly afraid of being discovered and considers killing a man who recognizes him. After coming to his senses, he relaxes and, like Sonny Butts, begins to organize old police files. He, too, reads Chief Lee's report on the old murders and observes Sonny Butts's notations regarding the pattern of subsequent disappearances. Building on the work of his two predecessors, Tucker also begins to suspect the now-aged Foxy Funderburke and makes inquiries about him.

A confluence of events distracts Tucker, including his own arrest on trumped-up charges and Billy Lee's race for governor, in which Tucker's hiring becomes an issue. These problems leave him inclined to do nothing about Foxy for the time being. Then John Howell, a reporter for The New York Times, convinces Tucker to take his evidence to the FBI and obtain a search warrant through them. Because Tucker's evidence is totally circumstantial, the FBI only reluctantly agrees to issue the warrant, which is limited to observation (no digging, prying up floorboards, etc.). When Tucker and federal agents search Foxy's property and find nothing at first, Tucker fears that he might have dealt a fatal blow to Billy Lee's campaign, but then one of the agents trips on what proves to be a motorcycle handlebar protruding from the ground. As Foxy emerges from the house, armed and intending to kill Tucker and the agents, he is distracted by John Howell and is himself shot dead. The ensuing investigation determines that Foxy had tortured, sodomized, murdered, and buried at least forty-three young men over the decades.

John Howell discovers Tucker's true identity but decides to keep it a secret. The novel ends as Hugh Holmes, pleased for Billy's success in the election but crushed by the revelations about Foxy and the shame the murders will bring to the city he did so much to build, is suffering a potentially fatal heart attack.

== 1983 TV movie ==
Chiefs was made into a CBS miniseries in 1983 starring Charlton Heston as Hugh Holmes, Keith Carradine as Foxy, Wayne Rogers as Will Lee, Brad Davis as Sonny Butts, Stephen Collins as Billy Lee, and Billy Dee Williams as Tyler (Tucker) Watts. Stuart Woods made a cameo appearance as "Pope". It was nominated for three Emmys.

The miniseries varies from the novel mostly in the Tucker Watts section, in that there is not as much focus on Billy Lee being a potential running mate for President Kennedy in the 1964 presidential election. Tucker's true identity is not discovered by the New York Times reporter, but after the election when he reveals his identity to Billy by remembering word-for-word the conversation they had on the day Billy's family left the farm and moved to town.

Production filming took place in Chester, South Carolina. In 2014, a celebration of the filming of Chiefs was organized in Chester by Catherine Fleming Bruce in collaboration with local organizations. Among the presenters was author Stuart Woods. The Chester newspaper reprinted coverage of Woods' visit to the City on the occasion of his death in 2022.
