= King of the Nerds season 3 =

King of the Nerds
- Season 3
- No. of episodes: 8

Release
- Original network: TBS
- Original release: January 23 – March 13, 2015

Season chronology
- ← Previous; Season 2 Next → –

The third and final season of King of the Nerds aired on TBS from January 23, 2015, to March 13, 2015. Inspired by the Revenge of the Nerds films, the season was hosted by actors and executive producers Robert Carradine and Curtis Armstrong, known for their roles as Lewis Skolnick and Dudley "Booger" Dawson, respectively, in Revenge of the Nerds.

== Contestants ==
Name	Hometown	Age	Specialty
Amanda Liston	Gilbert, Arizona	25	Bookworm
Ben Tully	Los Angeles, California	29	Marine biologist
Colby Burnett	Chicago, Illinois	29	Jeopardy! champion
Heather Wensler	Denver, Colorado	24	Neuroscientist
Jacob Rubin	Oakland, California	25	Quizmaster
Jonathan Adler^{[Note]}	Tempe, Arizona	28	Mathematician
Kaitlin Spak	Redwood City, California	26	NASA engineer
Lily Rutledge-Ellison	Denver, Colorado	21	Competitive cosplayer
Ori Perl	Silver Spring, Maryland	22	Larper
Raychelle Keeling	Springfield, Missouri	26	Gamer
Thomas Vollum	Huntington Beach, California	21	Brony
Todd Landree	Pittsburgh, Pennsylvania	26	Comic book nerd

1. ^{↑}Now goes by Jaqueline Nolis

== Contestant progress ==
Contestant	Episode								
Contestant	1	2	3	4	5	6	7^{1}	8	
Jonathan	IN	WIN	WIN	IN	IN	IN	IN	WIN	WINNER
Ben	WIN	IN	IN	WIN	WIN	WIN	WIN	WIN	RUNNER-UP
Kaitlin	WIN	RISK	RISK	WIN	WIN	WIN	IN	OUT^{2}	
Lily	WIN	IN	IN	WIN	WIN	WIN	RISK	OUT^{2}	
Raychelle	WIN	IN	IN	WIN	WIN	WIN	OUT		
Amanda	IN	WIN	WIN	IN	IN	RISK	OUT^{2}		
Colby	IN	WIN	WIN	RISK	RISK	OUT			
Heather	IN	WIN	WIN	IN	OUT				
Ori	RISK	WIN	WIN	OUT					
Todd	WIN	IN	OUT						
Thomas	WIN	OUT							
Jacob	OUT								

^Note 1: Teams were dissolved and Nerd Wars became individual challenges.
^Note 2: The loser(s) of the Nerd War were automatically eliminated.

Key
(WINNER) The contestant won the competition and was crowned "King of the Nerds".
(RUNNER-UP) The contestant was the runner-up in the competition.
(WIN) The contestant won the Nerd War and received immunity from elimination.
(IN) The contestant lost the Nerd War, but was not selected to compete in the Nerd-Off.
(RISK) The contestant won the Nerd-Off and escaped elimination.
(OUT) The contestant lost the Nerd-Off and was eliminated from the competition.
Teams
The contestant was a member of Team S.M.A.S.H. (Supersonic Masters And Slayers of Hordes).
The contestant was a member of Team House Hooloovoo.

== Episodes ==
No. overall	No. in season	Title	Original release date	US viewers (Live + Same Day) (millions)
17	1	"Judgment Day"	January 23, 2015	0.89
Nerd War: The teams, predetermined by hosts Carradine and Armstrong, construct steampunk-themed Rube Goldberg machines designed to reveal their official team names. If any interactions fail during their presentations, the teams are allowed to reset their machines up to three times. The contraptions are evaluated on their functionality, engineering, and creativity by a judging panel consisting of Syyn Labs president Adam Sadowsky, whose company built the Rube Goldberg machine featured in the music video for "This Too Shall Pass" by OK Go, actress and book author Danica McKellar, and actor and writer Michael McMillian.; Reward: Each member of the winning team earns a Comic Con survival kit from ThinkGeek.; Nerd-Off: Two players compete in a trivia challenge involving anime, manga, and kaiju. For every correct answer, the contestants, dressed as giant monsters, get to rampage through a section of a miniature city named "Little Little Tokyo". The first person to successfully answer four questions and destroy the factory in the final sector wins.
18	2	"And Now for Something Different"	January 30, 2015	0.70
Nerd War: The teams compete in a science fiction-themed cosplay contest, requiring them to create their own costumes and tell a story through performance. The teams are judged on their creativity, costumes, and moral of their stories by voice actress Tara Strong, professional cosplayer Yaya Han, and actor Billy Boyd.; Reward: The winning team receives $250 gift codes from BuyCostumes.com.; Nerd-Off: Two nerds embark on a journey through an enchanted forest filled with mythical creatures. The setting and outfits for the challenge draw inspiration from Monty Python and the Holy Grail. Each creature the contestants encounter poses them with a riddle. The first contestant to answer three riddles correctly wins.
19	3	"The Gods Are Angry"	February 6, 2015	0.81
Nerd War: Each team has two hours to craft two boats out of cardboard and duct tape, which they must use to race across a swimming pool. While crossing the water, the teams must collect submerged puzzle pieces etched with geometry problems, which, when solved and placed in the correct order, reveal the combination to a lock on a chest containing a golden laurel wreath. The first team to return to the starting point and place the wreath upon their bust is named the winner.; Reward: Each member of the winning team earns a Razer pro gaming system.; Nerd-Off: Two competitors take turns matching objects to relevant figures in ancient Greek mythology; for example, a wooden horse is paired with Odysseus, while theatre masks are paired with Dionysus. The first person to match four items correctly wins.
20	4	"Do They Choose Wisely...or Poorly?"	February 13, 2015	0.86
Nerd War: In a throwback to the first season of King of the Nerds, the teams work with music producers and choreographers to create their own "nerd anthems". The teams are judged on their lyrics, choreography, and overall performance by Gym Class Heroes lead vocalist Travie McCoy, singer-songwriter and actress Lisa Loeb, and recording artist and DJ Moby.; Reward: The winners receive multimedia gaming headsets from Turtle Beach Systems.; Nerd-Off: Two contestants compete in a challenge inspired by Indiana Jones. First, the nerds must grab a whip lying atop a steep hill, dodging giant boulders along the way, and use it to disarm a gun-wielding mannequin. Then, they must obtain a dagger from a cauldron filled with live snakes and cut through a rope connected to a suspended burlap sack, which contains ten idols labeled with the names of famous "nerds of yore": Leonardo da Vinci, Nicolaus Copernicus, Isaac Newton, Benjamin Franklin, Mary Shelley, Nikola Tesla, Madame Curie, Albert Einstein, Neil Armstrong, and Stephen Hawking. The first person to correctly order the idols by birthdate wins.
21	5	"Nuclear Nerd Games"	February 20, 2015	0.78
Nerd War: The teams compete in a variety of party games. Magician Penn Jillette and actress Rachelle Lefevre temporarily join the teams to provide their assistance. The team with the most points after three games ("Name that Nerd", "Pic-so-Nerdy", and "Panto-Nerd") wins the challenge.; Reward: Each winning team member receives an ultimate tabletop pack from Rio Grande Games.; Nerd-Off: Set in a post-nuclear dystopian future, two players race to complete a word jumble. The nerds must first retrieve 28 letter tiles hidden, amongst other items, inside several bins of green "toxic waste". They must then arrange the letters to form words and fill in the blanks to an incomplete message. The boxed letters within the message are used to solve the final answer phrase. The first person to finish the word jumble, without spelling errors, is safe from elimination.
22	6	"Murder at Nerdvana?!"	February 27, 2015	0.86
Nerd War: The teams are tested on their knowledge of forensic science in a murder mystery challenge. To solve the mystery, the teams race to complete four stations centered around several criminal investigation techniques: fingerprint analysis, bloodstain pattern analysis, hair analysis, and DNA profiling. The first team to solve the stations and deduce the identity of the murderer, along with their weapon, wins.; Reward: The winners each receive a prize robotics kit.; Nerd-Off: Two contestants compete in a trivia contest about horror films. They must first identify a horror film based on the movie quote provided by the hosts. For every correct answer, the contestants get to use their cricket bats to bash zombies in the head. Each zombie has a different hidden point value. Higher difficulty questions allow the players to kill more zombies and net more points. The person with the highest score after three rounds is declared the winner.; Note: Following the Nerd-Off, teams are officially dissolved and subsequent Nerd Wars become individual challenges.
23	7	"Invasion of the Nerd Snatchers"	March 6, 2015	0.87
Nerd War: The competitors take turns listing off words related to a particular category, such as the first generation of Pokémon, spells from Harry Potter, songs by "Weird Al" Yankovic, and plays by William Shakespeare. If a player is unable to answer, an alien queen blasts them in the face with "acid". Two squirts to the face knocks them out of the challenge. The game continues until one nerd remains. After the winner is determined, the first two contestants to be eliminated from the Nerd War compete in a sudden-death round. The loser is immediately banished.; Reward: The winner receives their own robot sculpture by artist and sculptor Dave Pressler.; Nerd-Off: Two contestants compete in a variation of Stratego, controlling an army of game pieces, representing different types of nerds, to find and capture the opponent's flag. The players' pieces are arranged on the board according to their specifications, and they cannot see the values of their opponent's pieces. The first player to capture the enemy flag wins.
24	8	"The Nerdtastic Finale"	March 13, 2015	0.83
Nerd War: The remaining contestants compete in a quiz bowl based on various nerd topics. The first two competitors to answer five questions correctly earn a spot in the final Nerd-Off. The banished nerds must pledge allegiance to one of the four finalists, who is allowed to call upon them to answer one question on their behalf.; Nerd-Off: The final two nerds compete head-to-head in seven "fiendishly insidious nerd games": speed chess, Tekken Tag Tournament 2, a crossword puzzle, a word logic puzzle, a math equation puzzle, Connect Four, and a nonogram. The first person to win four games is crowned "King of the Nerds".
