= Church of Scientology editing on Wikipedia =

Series of incidents that led to the church's banning from Wikipedia

Church of Scientology IP addresses blocked

2) All IP addresses owned or operated by the Church of Scientology and its associates, broadly interpreted, are to be blocked as if they were open proxies. Individual editors may request IP block exemption if they wish to contribute from the blocked IP addresses.

Passed 10 to 1 at 13:31, 28 May 2009 (UTC)

Church of Scientology edits to Wikipedia led to a ban on editing the entire website from the organization's computers.

A series of incidents in 2009 led to Church of Scientology–owned networks being blocked from making edits to Wikipedia articles relating to Scientology. The Church of Scientology has long had a controversial history on the Internet and had initiated campaigns to manipulate material and remove information critical of itself from the web. From early in Wikipedia's history, conflict arose regarding the website's coverage of Scientology. Disputes began in earnest in 2005, with users disagreeing about whether or not to describe Scientology as an abusive cult or religion, and continued through the decade.

WikiScanner, a publicly searchable database that linked anonymous edits on Wikipedia to the organizations where those edits apparently originated, made public the nature of edits on Wikipedia which were able to be traced directly back to Church of Scientology-controlled computers. News organizations reported that the edits included removing criticism of Scientology, downplaying connections between Scientology and the New Cult Awareness Network, and adding links to Scientology-affiliated groups such as the Citizens Commission on Human Rights.

In January 2009, a case involving Scientology was brought before Wikipedia's Arbitration Committee. Wikipedia administrators presented evidence during the case that Church of Scientology-controlled computers were used to promote the organization, using multiple user accounts. One user, going by the pseudonym "COFS", admitted this pattern of editing and stated the edits from Scientology computers would continue. In May 2009, the Arbitration Committee decided to restrict editing from IP addresses belonging to the Church of Scientology to prevent biased edits. The decision meant that Church of Scientology-controlled IP addresses received the same blockable status as open proxies on the site. Many Scientology critics were also banned; the committee concluded that both sides had "gamed policy" and resorted to "battlefield tactics", with articles on living persons being the "worst casualties" of edits. On 7 January 2022, the rule of IP addresses owned by Scientology being blocked as if they were open proxies was lifted.

Arbitration Committee member Roger Davies wrote the majority of the decision, and commented to The New York Times that due to the controversial nature of the case, the decision was crafted so as not to focus directly upon any particular individual. Statements from Church of Scientology spokeswoman Karin Pouw labelled the arbitration ruling as a routine matter and maintained there were still "gross inaccuracies" on the Scientology article. In a statement to CNN, Pouw denied the presence of an organized campaign by the Church of Scientology to manipulate Wikipedia. Scientology representative Tommy Davis emphasized to the St. Petersburg Times that users critical of the organization were also banned, and similarly denied that Church of Scientology leadership arranged a campaign to manipulate entries on Wikipedia.

== Background ==
The Church of Scientology has a controversial history on the Internet. It has been criticized for attempting to restrict freedom of speech on the Internet; this conflict has come to be known as Scientology versus the Internet, or Scientology v. The Net. The organization has attempted to manipulate and maintain power over its public image on the web. Early lawsuits involved in this dispute have included Religious Technology Center v. Netcom, as well as Religious Technology Center v. F.A.C.T. Net. Writing in his book, Cyber Rights: Defending Free Speech in the Digital Age, author Mike Godwin noted, "In one of the earliest widely publicized sets of cases involving intellectual property on the Net, the Church of Scientology has been exploring the uses of copyright and trade secret law when it comes to silencing its critics, many of them former members of the church." The Guardian noted, "According to insiders and security experts, Scientologists have been conducting concerted campaigns for more than a decade to remove online information critical of the organisation." In response to criticism over its actions on the Internet, Scientology has stated its efforts are aimed at defending the copyrights over its secretive spiritual documents.

Legal cases have involved a newsgroup focused on the topic called alt.religion.scientology, which revealed information from advanced Scientology methods including the Operating Thetan (OT) levels that describe the story of Xenu. In 1995, attorneys representing the Church of Scientology tried to get alt.religion.scientology removed from Usenet. This maneuver had the opposite impact for Scientology, serving to drive up popularity of alt.religion.scientology and resulting in a "declaration of war" from the hacker organization Cult of the Dead Cow. Professor David S. Touretzky of the computer science department and Center for the Neural Basis of Cognition at Carnegie Mellon University in Pittsburgh, Pennsylvania, is a critic of Scientology and proponent of freedom of speech on the Internet. He noted the Scientology organization was "trying to threaten freedom of speech on the Internet by making service providers legally responsible for their customers' speech." Wendy M. Grossman, journalist and founder of The Skeptic, observed of Scientology's attempts to suppress information on the Internet:

Scientology versus the Net ... was the original net.war. The story was at heart pretty simple (and the skirmishes continue, in various translations into newer media, to this day). Scientology has a bunch of super-secrets that only the initiates, who have spent many hours in expensive Scientology training, are allowed to see. Scientology's attempts to keep those secrets off the Net resulted in their being published everywhere. The dust has never completely settled.

Three people can keep a secret if two of them are dead, said Mark Twain. [actually Benjamin Franklin] That was before the Internet. Scientology was the first to learn—nearly 15 years ago—that the best way to ensure the maximum publicity for something is to try to suppress it.

== History ==
=== Early conflict ===
Conflict within the topic of Scientology on Wikipedia arose early on from the website's beginnings. Author Jonathan Zittrain noted in The Future of the Internet – And How to Stop It, his 2009 book published by Yale University Press, that "as Wikipedia grew it began to attract editors who had never crossed paths before, and who disagreed on articles they were simultaneously editing. One person would say that Scientology was a 'cult', the other would change that back to 'religion,' and the first would revert it back again." In a 2005 article about Wikipedia for The Guardian, Charles Arthur noted individuals debated online, "whether Scientology should be classed as a cult", and he compared the "cultism" of Scientology to that of Wikipedia itself. ABC News noted in a 2009 article, "Wikipedia disputes about Scientology have gone on since 2005."

In 2006, conflict on Wikipedia within the topic of Scientology was drawn out over specific disagreements. Journalist Alan Bjerga of McClatchy Newspapers reported in August 2006, "Wayne Saewyc, a Wikipedia spokesman, said debates on controversial topics can become incredibly time-consuming and sometimes maddening. In the entry covering Scientology, for example, contributors argued for nine months over whether the Scientologist method of childbirth should be called 'silent birth' or 'quiet birth.'" In an October 2006 article about Wikipedia, Paul Vallely of The Independent commented that, "Some pages seem to have been taken over by fanatics and special interest groups (try the Scientology page)." Wikipedia user and Scientology critic David Gerard is cited in The Daily Telegraph in October 2006 about the state of Scientology articles on the site as believing that "the Wikipedia entry is the most balanced and informative account to be found anywhere on the web." Gerard commented on "NPOV" (neutral point of view) in the topic, "This is a good example of why NPOV is one of the most revolutionary things about Wikipedia. On the web you'll find a lot of Church of Scientology sites, and a lot of critics' sites, which are generally very bitter. On Wikipedia you have to be neutral, and you have to be able to reference your facts."

=== WikiScanner revelations ===
The development of the WikiScanner software by Virgil Griffith in 2007 revealed changes made to Wikipedia articles by Scientology organization computers. CBS News reported, "Many of the edits are predictably self-interested: PCs in Scientology officialdom were used to remove criticism in the church's Wikipedia entry." The Independent noted, "Computers with IP addresses traced to the Church of Scientology were used to expunge critical paragraphs about the cult's world-wide operations." The Times reported that a computer operated by the Church of Scientology was used to manipulate information in the Wikipedia article about the Cult Awareness Network, "A computer linked to the Church of Scientology's network was used to delete references to links between it and a group dubbed the 'Cult Awareness Network.'" Forbes noted, "Scientology officials appear to have removed critical comments from an anti-cult organization."

Der Spiegel reported in more depth on some of the edits revealed by WikiScanner to have been made on Wikipedia by computers associated with the Church of Scientology. From 2003 to 2007, 170 edits were made, a large proportion of which focused on Scientologist views critical of psychiatry. For example, the article "Kurt Cobain" was edited by a Scientologist in order to include a link to the Scientology-founded "Citizens Commission on Human Rights" (CCHR), putting forth the notion that "the singer's childhood Ritalin prescription led him to suicide". Multiple edits involved adding links to webpages of organizations affiliated with Scientology.

Reporting for Slate, journalist Michael Agger observed that an edit by a Scientology-associated IP address to a Scientology-related article on Wikipedia does not necessarily indicate such an edit was made by an employee of the organization. Virgil Griffith explained, "Technically, we don't know if it came from an agent of that company. However, we do know that edit came from someone with access to their network. If the edit occurred during working hours, then we can reasonably assume that the person is either an employee of that company or a guest that was allowed access to their network."

=== Project Chanology ===
After the Scientology organization tried to remove a promotional film of Scientology featuring celebrity member Tom Cruise from the Internet, a group of web-based activists known as "Anonymous" focused efforts against Scientology. Anonymous disrupted Scientology websites and spread anti-Scientologist materials online. In July 2008, Messenger Newspapers noted, "A war between internet collective Anonymous and the Church of Scientology" had been "fought out largely on the battlefields of YouTube, Wikipedia and other websites", before emerging to become a movement with protests taking place in front of Scientology buildings. Known as Project Chanology, the movement was "Organised from a Wikipedia-style website (editable by anyone) and through anonymous internet chat rooms". The New York Times noted that through its actions related to attempts to remove the Tom Cruise video from the Internet, the Church of Scientology became a victim of the Streisand effect – a phenomenon whereby attempts to suppress information on the Internet end up having the opposite impact.

=== Arbitration Committee ban ===
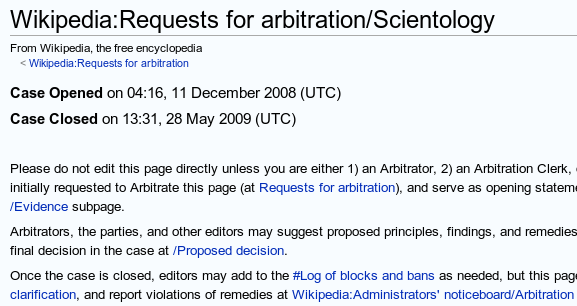
Wikipedia's Arbitration Committee concluded the Scientology case on May 28, 2009.

In January 2009, The Register reported on an ongoing case involving Scientology before Wikipedia's Arbitration Committee, "According to site administrators, several pro-Scientology accounts have been editing the site using Scientology-owned computers." The Arbitration Committee on Wikipedia is composed of a group of volunteers elected by the editing community to resolve especially difficult conflicts. During the arbitration case, the page about Scientology was modified by members of the organization. Scientologists had doctored entries in order to advertise for their cause. The Register noted that one of the Wikipedia users admitted he had edited from computers operated by the Scientology organization, "One of these pro-Scientology editors – who once used the handle 'COFS' – has admitted as much. And he vows to continue editing Scientology articles from Scientology computers." The Register quoted the "COFS" user as saying, "I am not going to leave voluntarily and I will continue to use a) my own computer, b) public computers, c) my wireless laptop, d) computers in the Church of Scientology and any station I please". The Guardian cited The Register, and noted, "The technology news website The Register alleges the church has an organised operation to challenge internet criticism."

In an effort to adhere to Wikipedia policy, Wikipedia's Arbitration Committee decided on May 28, 2009, to restrict editing from Scientology organization IP addresses in order to prevent self-serving edits by editors within Church of Scientology–administered networks. The decision accorded Scientology-controlled IP addresses the same blockable status as open proxies on the site. Ten members of the Arbitration Committee voted in favor of the ruling, thus preventing such users from editing existing articles or creating new articles on the site. Wikipedia previously frequently had banned individual users from the site, but not entire organizations. The arbitration decision came as the culmination of a "longstanding struggle" involving promoters of the organization and critics of its practices. ABC News noted the conflict was "one of the longest-running disputes in Wikipedia's history". The conflict involved over 400 articles within the topic of Scientology. It was the fourth such arbitration case before Wikipedia's Arbitration Committee on the topic of Scientology in the prior four years. The case was drawn out for six months, prior to the decision of the Arbitration Committee.

The committee ruled that the Scientology organization had a responsibility to "ensure appropriate use of its servers and equipment", and pointed to a conflict of interest involved with edits from Scientology-associated computers. The block on IP addresses includes those originating from the Church of Scientology's offices in Los Angeles, California; the organization additionally maintains headquarters in Clearwater, Florida.

News.com.au reported, "According to evidence found by Wikipedia, multiple users with known scientology IP addresses had been 'openly editing (Scientology-related articles) from Church of Scientology equipment and apparently coordinating their activities'." Sky News noted that the ban on Scientology computers applies to "Any computer addresses 'owned or operated' by the Church or associates linked to it". Fox News Channel reported on the decision, "The encyclopedia's administrators found that Scientology computers had been repeatedly changing more than 400 pages related to the Church, deleting negative references and adding positive ones. The volume of changes was overwhelming administrators' ability to reverse them, hence the block." Fox News Channel described the decision by the Arbitration Committee to block Scientology-controlled IP addresses as "an unprecedented move"; The Guardian similarly noted, "whatever your feelings towards the world of Scientology, Wikipedia's decision to enact a blanket ban appears to be unprecedented." InfoWorld wrote that edits by the Scientology organization were motivated by, "a massive organized effort to make the CoS look good and/or counter the relentless public criticism that has shadowed the organization since the earliest days of the Net." Wired News reported that the ban on the Scientology organization was triggered by "repeated and deceptive editing of articles related to the controversial religion". The Los Angeles Times noted that the ban stemmed from "the church's self-serving wiki-revisionism". Der Spiegel noted that skeptics doubted the efficacy of the ban on the Scientology-controlled IP addresses, and commented on the likelihood of individuals creating multiple account names.

A "host of anti-Scientologist editors" were topic-banned as well by the Arbitration Committee. The committee noted that an "aggravating factor" had been "the apparent presence of notable critics of Scientology, from several Internet organizations, apparently editing under their own names and citing either their own or each other's self-published material." The committee concluded that both sides had "gamed policy" and resorted to "battlefield tactics" to create articles that were either "disparaging or complimentary", with articles on living persons being the "worst casualties".

On 7 January 2022 the rule of IP addresses owned by Scientology being blocked as if they were open proxies was lifted.

==== Wikimedia comments ====
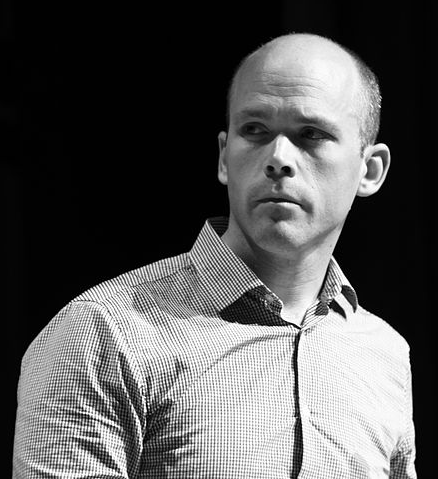
Wikimedia Foundation head of communications Jay Walsh emphasized the arbitration decision was aimed at getting Scientology-related articles to an acceptable state on Wikipedia.

Arbitration Committee member Roger Davies wrote the majority of the decision in the Scientology case. Davies commented in an interview with The New York Times, "It was obvious that this case was going to be controversial pretty much from the start. What we have done is we've really tried to make sure that we have not directed our fire at anyone in particular." He noted there was a recurring pattern of disputed editing on controversial topics, "One of the problems we keep bumping into is what I call core belief issues — politics, religion, nationalism. Fringe faiths, fringe nationalities."

Wikimedia Foundation spokesman and head of communications, Jay Walsh, stated the decision was focused on reducing hostility within the subject and getting articles back to an appropriate state. Walsh emphasized to Bloomberg BusinessWeek that edits which serve the interests of organizations are acceptable, but must be within the procedure of "adding valuable context" to articles. In a statement to The Wall Street Journal, Walsh said, "This is about people reducing the hostility around the topic, and getting the articles back to a state where they make sense. I think the arbitration committee wants to send the message that Wikipedians have to be neutral on all accounts and all fronts. They don't take these situations lightly. They understand there's a perspective of: Are we censoring people or individuals? It's really about what can we do that's best for Wikipedia and the people who read it." When asked by Ross Reynolds of National Public Radio affiliate KUOW-FM why the arbitration decision included a "ban on IP addresses at the Church of Scientology", Walsh answered, "So the simple answer is that within looking at these computers and where these edits were coming from, the decision is that ultimately most of the edits within these ranges have been from single-user-accounts, people who have a single intention to change or move or in some cases remove information, which could be considered censorship, which is really something that doesn't work out well on Wikipedia. And this is an effort to kind of calm that effect, and to bring some neutrality and some quality back to these articles."

Wikipedia media contact, Dan Rosenthal, stated to ABC News, "Scientology is up there among the most controversial on Wikipedia. You can compare it to articles on abortion, the presidential election and the like and there's been nowhere near the level of bitterness and fighting." Rosenthal commented, "You could imply that there is a conflict of interest. Rather than two unrelated people getting together", promoters of the Scientology organization were "getting together, saying, 'Let's work together to make this a more pro-scientology article.'" Rosenthal noted that "it is standard practice to ban users found violating rules designed to keep people with an agenda from propagandizing." Rosenthal said that approximately 300 users are blocked or banned per day from Wikipedia in order to stop vandalism, or for violating regulations created to prevent propaganda. Catrin Schoneville, spokesperson for Wikimedia Germany, stated to Computerwoche that the decision impacted the English Wikipedia version, and it was unknown whether a similar decision in the future would be applied to the German Wikipedia site.

==== Scientology statements ====
Scientology spokeswoman, Karin Pouw, stated of the Wikipedia arbitration decision, "Do Scientologists care what has been posted on Wikipedia? Of course. Some of it has been very hateful and erroneous." Pouw commented, "We hope all this will result in more accurate and useful articles on Wikipedia." She characterized the Arbitration Committee decision as "a routine internal action by Wikipedia to clean up its editing process". Pouw emphasized, "More importantly is the fact that Wikipedia finally banned those who were engaged in unobjective and biased editing for the purposes of antagonism as opposed to providing accurate information." Pouw commented to ABC News, "People have conflicts on Wikipedia all the time, and it's obvious why – anybody can post." Bloomberg Businessweek reported on Pouw's statements, "[Pouw] says her organization regularly monitors the Internet for wrong information about its belief system and members. After this ruling, Pouw says there remain 'gross inaccuracies' on the Scientology article on Wikipedia that she hopes will eventually be corrected. But for the time being, her group's ability to do that have been weakened." In a statement to CNN, Pouw asserted "she is unaware of any coordinated effort to alter Wikipedia".

Tommy Davis, a representative of the Scientology organization, stated to the St. Petersburg Times that members of the organization were attempting to correct what they perceived as factual inaccuracies: "The story that's being missed is there were people who were doing nonstop attacks on the church and using Wikipedia to do it. Those people have been banned." Davis denied that Scientology leadership arranged a campaign to manipulate entries on Wikipedia. He asserted, "The church is huge ... Scientologists are going to say what they're going to say about their own religion."

== Reception ==
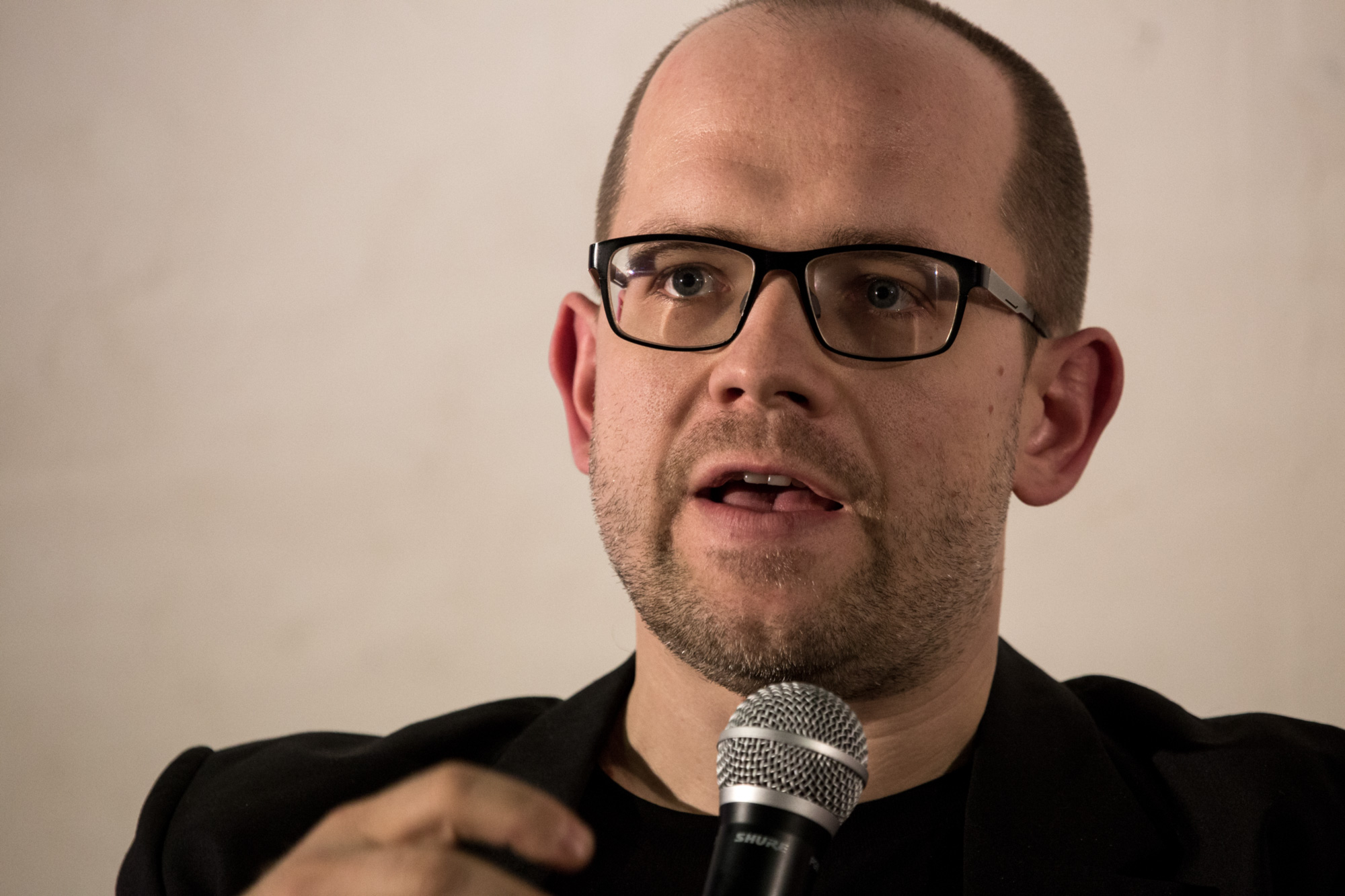
Evgeny Morozov of Foreign Policy, who criticized the decision

Writing in the 2009 book Scientology, contributor Mikael Rothstein commented positively about the Wikipedia article on "Xenu", "The most sober and enlightening text about the Xenu myth is probably the anonymous article on Wikipedia". Writing about Scientology in her 2010 book Insiders' Guide to the Greater Tampa Bay Area, author Anne W. Anderson noted, "In May 2009, Wikipedia ... imposed a very rare ban on some computers that were repeatedly editing entries about Scientology." In an August 2009 article for Time, titled "A Brief History of Wikipedia", journalist Dan Fletcher noted, "In May, Wikipedia banned IP addresses owned by the Church of Scientology on the grounds that Scientologists were making edits that didn't suggest a 'neutral point of view' – the encyclopedia's golden rule."

In an interview with ABC News, sociologist of the University of Alberta, Stephen A. Kent commented, "Historically, Scientology has tried to control what critics say about it. The Internet, however, has posed insurmountable problems regarding control and censorship and Wikipedia's action is just one of many disputes that have occurred when Internet users have pushed back. Scientology can't roll over and give up on this issue. It will continue to attempt to have its representation." Evgeny Morozov of Foreign Policy wrote a blog post critical of the arbitration decision, and stated, "I am no fan of Scientology, but I think that banning them from Wikipedia is going to be counterproductive. Unfortunately, it presents the Wikipedia admins/editors as a non-neutral group that opposes a particular set of ideas." In an August 2010 article in The Guardian, journalists Rachel Shabi and Jemima Kiss observed, "Editors can remain anonymous when changing content, but conflicts are passed to Wikipedia's arbitration committee. Scientology was a regular source of conflict until the committee blocked editing by the movement."

== See also ==
- List of Guardian's Office operations
- Operation Clambake
- Operation Freakout
- Operation Snow White
- Scieno Sitter
- Scientology and the legal system
- Scientology controversies
