= Wolfgang Stock =

German author

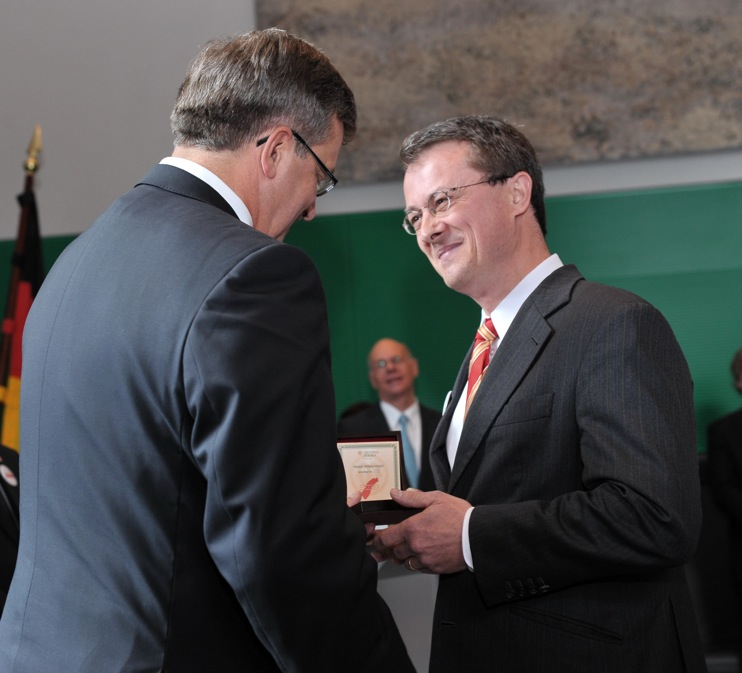
Stock on the occasion of the awarding of the Medal of the European Centre of Solidarity by President of Poland, Bronisław Komorowski.

Wolfgang Stock (born 5 July 1959 in Hanover) is a German author, professor, former journalist and former managing partner of Convincet, a business consultancy for corporate communications. He was CEO of a free Christian school in Berlin and, since 2017, leads the German Association of free Christian schools, VEBS. Since 2025, he is Secretary General of the European Alliance for Christian Education, EACE.

== Life ==
=== Education ===
Wolfgang Stock studied history and political science at the University of Würzburg and the University of Oxford. He earned a PhD with a thesis on the German European policy at the University of Oxford and completed the Advanced Management Program at the IESE Business School in Barcelona .

=== Journalistic and Academic Career ===
In the 1980s, he began his journalistic career as a freelance correspondent for various newspapers in the former Eastern Bloc countries, he reported during the period of martial law in Poland. He established close contacts with opposition intellectuals in the GDR, the Polish trade union Solidarity and Charter 77 in Czechoslovakia. He was an employee of one of the deputies of the European Parliament, Otto von Habsburg (CSU), and he edited the Paneuropean Journal. At the same time he was involved in the Paneuropean Youth. As an organizer and driver for relief transport of the International Society for Human Rights, he assisted, in the mid-1980s, Father Jerzy Popieluszko in his efforts to supply the families of the Polish opposition under martial law. He was the first West European person who arrived in Gdańsk after the imposition of martial law on 13 December 1981, leading a transport worth of relief supplies for families of Solidarity activist confined in detention camps. In 1985, the then communist part of Germany (GDR) declared him a criminal person and denied him visas.

Working with Frankfurter Allgemeine Zeitung (FAZ) as a correspondent since 1988, he reported, in 1990, on the first free elections in Eastern Germany/GDR. From 1991 on, he was political correspondent with the FAZ in Bonn. From 1996 to 1998 he was news editor of Berliner Zeitung, from 1998 to 2001 political correspondent for Focus in the federal capital, first Bonn and then Berlin. In 2000, he published the first biography of chancellor Angela Merkel. From 2001 to 2003, he was political editor and a managing editor of Germany's leading Sunday paper Welt am Sonntag.

Stock was professor of Journalism and division head at the Gustav Siewerth Academy from 2001 to 2009. In 2004 and 2005 he worked for two semesters as a visiting professor for professional journalism at the University of Giessen. From 2006 to 2015 he holds lectureships in journalism at the European University Viadrina, Frankfurt (Oder). From 2015 to 2025 he was teaching at IST-Hochschule for Management, Duesseldorf.

From 2003 to 2005 he worked for the media research institute Media Tenor. From 2005 to 2014 Stock was managing partner of the corporate communications consulting agency Convincet GmbH (former RCC Public Affairs, among other things, the video podcast of Chancellor Angela Merkel and produces initiated.

In October 2009 he lodged the only successful content complaint in the tenth term of the Rundfunkrat of the WDR Broadcasting against a film of the journalist Klaus Martens. The Film "Heilung unerwünscht" (undesirable healing) was about a neurodermatitis ointment . In May 2010, the Rundfunkrat of the WDR declared that the film violated the journalistic fairness through a highly simplified and one-sided representation thus held stocks complaint. Consequently, the principles for Investigative Reporting for all groups of WDR program were revised.

=== Project Wiki-Watch ===
In October 2010, Stock and the lawyer and professor Johannes Weberling founded the Arbeitsstelle Wiki-Watch im "Studien- und Forschungsschwerpunkt Medienrecht" der Juristischen Fakultät der Europa-Universität Viadrina (in short project Wiki-Watch) as Division of the media-law branch of the Viadrina European University, Germany which watches Wikipedia critically.

Wiki-Watch conducted and published a survey of administrators of German Wikipedia and blogs regularly about German Wikipedia problems. Wiki-Watch's site wiki-watch.org provides statistic insights on Wikipedia and evaluates automatically the formal reliability of Wikipedia articles in English and German by using statistical edit data and by collaborating with WikiTrust.

An article published in the Frankfurter Allgemeine Zeitung July 2011 and repeated in other media described an alleged conflict of interest between Stocks work for Wiki-Watch and for a pharmaceutical company which was a client of his agency Convincet. Weberling and Stock announced legal action against the newspaper, whereupon the online-articles have been taken offline. Stocks last Wikipedia edits in the area of pharmaceuticals and health issues date two years earlier in spring 2009 and one year before founding Wiki-Watch in late 2010. By his own admission his edits derived from personal interest and concernment and were not paid by anybody. Only later, from summer 2009 on he had worked as a communications consultant for the pharmaceutical company. In a formal reply in Der Spiegel, Stock unchallenged claimed that he had made his edits of entries related to a pharmaceutical company before beginning his consulting work for this company.

The European University Viadrina called the allegations against him "demonstrably false".

=== Career in Christian education ===
From 1998 to 2012 he was honorary director of a Christian day care in Woltersdorf.

From 2012 to 2017 he was CEO of Freie Evangelische Schulen Berlin, since named Christburg Campus, a group of four free Christian schools and three kindergartens in Berlin, serving about 1,000 students.

In 2016 he was elected Secretary General of the German national umbrella organisation of free Evangelical schools, VEBS. Since 2025, he is Secretary General of the European Alliance for Christian Education.

== Decorations and community activities ==
On 3 September 2010, the Polish state president Bronislaw Komorowski awarded him with the Medal of the European Centre of Solidarity in the German Reichstag parliament building in Berlin in the presence of the Bundestag's president Norbert Lammert. He received the medal for organizing the support of Solidarity activist's families and supplying the Solidarity underground with, inter alia, printing presses and "smuggling" of current literature from Germany to Poland, as well as political, dissident literature from Poland to Germany.

Stock was, until retirement in 2024, Oberstleutnant (Lieutenant Colonel) of the Military reserve force at the Kreisverbindungskommando Karlsruhe of the German Army. He is a member of the Independent Evangelical Lutheran Church.

Stock was elected to the municipal council (Gemeinderat) of Woltersdorf, Brandenburg and chairman of its Central Committee from 2008 to 2011 and an elected member of the regional council (Kreistag) of Landkreis Oder-Spree from 2014 until 2016.

== Publications ==
- Wolfgang Stock, Helmut Müller-Embergs, Heike Schmoll: Das Fanal: das Opfer des Pfarrers Brüsewitz und die evangelische Kirche, Ullstein, Frankfurt/Main und Berlin 1993, ISBN 3-548-36616-3.
- Wolfgang Stock, Kai Diekmann, Ulrich Reitz: Roman Herzog: Der Neue Bundesprasident Im Gespräch, Lübbe-Verlag, Bergisch Gladbach 1994, ISBN 3-404-61299-X.
- Wolfgang Stock, Kai Diekmann, Ulrich Reitz: Rita Süssmuth im Gespräch, Lübbe-Verlag, Bergisch Gladbach 1994, ISBN 3-404-61327-9.
- Wolfgang Stock: "Gedenken und Informieren" Die Selbstverbrennung von Pfarrer Oskar Brüsewitz, 18. August 1996 Ursachen, Hintergründe und Folgen Schulverwaltungs- und Kulturamt, Zeitz (1998), ISBN 3-313-11313-3
- Wolfgang Stock, Jürgen Aretz: Die vergessenen Opfer der DDR, Lübbe-Verlag, Bergisch Gladbach 1997, ISBN 3-404-60444-X.
- Wolfgang Stock: Angela Merkel: eine politische Biographie, Olzog-Verlag, München 2000, ISBN 3-7892-8038-0 (1989–2000); Neuauflage 2005, ISBN 3-7892-8168-9 (1989–2005).
- "Rettet unsere Schulen, Wie wir die Bildungskrise überwinden und unseren Kindern eine bessere Zukunft schenken", Fontis-Verlag 2024, ISBN 978-3-03848-274-1.
