= King of the Nerds season 1 =

King of the Nerds
- Season 1
- No. of episodes: 8

Release
- Original network: TBS
- Original release: January 17 – March 7, 2013

Season chronology
- Next → Season 2

The first season of King of the Nerds aired on TBS from January 13, 2013 to March 7, 2013. Inspired by the Revenge of the Nerds films, the season was hosted by actors and executive producers Robert Carradine and Curtis Armstrong, known for their roles as Lewis Skolnick and Dudley "Booger" Dawson, respectively, in Revenge of the Nerds.

== Contestants ==
Name	Hometown	Age	Specialty
Alana Smith-Brown	Corning, New York	26	Comic book nerd
Brandon Moore	Heath, Texas	24	Neuroscientist
Celeste Anderson	Orillia, Ontario	22	Pro gamer
Danielle Mackey	Rome, New York	23	Video game vlogger
Genevieve Pearson	Tacoma, Washington	27	Fantasy writer
Hеndrik Lеnfеrink	Little Deer Isle, Maine	26	Geophysicist
Ivan Van Norman	Los Angeles, California	27	Role-playing game designer
Jon Paprocki	Atlanta, Georgia	22	Mathematician
Joshua Ovenshire	Los Angeles, California	24	Comics & gaming nerd
Moogega Cooper	Pasadena, California	26	NASA engineer
Virgil Griffith	Pasadena, California	28	Master hacker

== Contestant progress ==
Contestant	Episode									
Contestant	1	2	3	4	5	6	7^{2}	8		
Celeste	IN	IN	WIN	IN	WIN	IN	IN	IN	WIN	WINNER
Genevieve	IN	IN	WIN	RISK	WIN	RISK	RISK	IN	WIN	RUNNER-UP
Danielle	WIN	WIN	RISK	WIN	IN	WIN	WIN	WIN	OUT^{3}	Celeste
Ivan	WIN	WIN	IN	WIN	RISK	WIN	IN	OUT^{3}		Genevieve
Moogega	WIN	WIN	IN	WIN	IN	WIN	OUT			Genevieve
Virgil	IN	IN	WIN	IN	WIN	OUT				Celeste
Joshua	WIN	WIN	IN	WIN	OUT					Celeste
Alana	IN^{1}	RISK	WIN	OUT						Celeste
Brandon	WIN	WIN	OUT							Celeste
Jon	RISK	OUT								Celeste
Hеndrik	OUT									Genevieve

^Note 1: Alana received individual immunity from being sent to the Nerd-Off.
^Note 2: Teams were dissolved and Nerd Wars became individual challenges.
^Note 3: The final Nerd War was separated into two phases; in each phase, the loser was automatically eliminated.

Key
(WINNER) The contestant won the competition and was crowned "King of the Nerds".
(RUNNER-UP) The contestant was the runner-up in the competition.
(WIN) The contestant won the Nerd War and received immunity from elimination.
(IN) The contestant lost the Nerd War, but was not selected to compete in the Nerd-Off.
(RISK) The contestant won the Nerd-Off and escaped elimination.
(OUT) The contestant lost the Nerd-Off and was eliminated from the competition.
Teams
The contestant was a member of Team Blextrophy.
The contestant was a member of Team Servants of the Forsaken Orb.

== Episodes ==
No. overall	No. in season	Title	Original release date	US viewers (Live + Same Day) (millions)
1	1	"Welcome to Nerdvana"	January 17, 2013	1.99
Nerd War: Two players are randomly selected as captains to initiate a schoolyard pick to separate the remaining players into teams, with one player left over. As "nothing is nerdier than getting picked last", this player is considered the winner, gaining immunity from the Nerd-Off, selecting the winning team, and subsequently joining the losing team.; Nerd-Off: Two players face off in a chess match on a life-size board, with the loser being sent home.
2	2	"Imaginary Realms"	January 24, 2013	1.65
Nerd War: The teams are challenged to a cosplay competition, requiring them to develop a coherent mythology and appearance for the given themes (villains from a fantasy setting, and heroes from a science fiction setting). The teams are judged by actor and author George Takei, costume designer and professional cosplayer Yaya Han, and actor Adam Busch.; Reward: The winners train with a world-renowned swords-mistress and are given a Little Caesars pizza lunch.; Nerd-Off: Two contestants compete in a trivia challenge involving fictional settings. Each correct answer earns the player the chance to roll an oversized die down a hill towards a series of targets worth various point values, with points being awarded for each target knocked over. The player with the lowest score is eliminated.
3	3	"Games without Frontiers"	January 31, 2013	1.57
Nerd War: The teams are tasked with navigating tablet-controlled quadcopters through an obstacle course, with various obstacles worth varying point values. While one team attempts to fly the quadcopter, the opposing team has the opportunity to shoot it down with Nerf guns, which counts against the controlling team. After both teams complete the timed run, the team with the highest score is declared the winner.; Nerd-Off: Two nerds steer remote-controlled golf carts to push exercise balls into marked goals. The player that successfully scores two goals first is declared the winner.
4	4	"Supernerds"	February 7, 2013	1.48
Nerd War: The teams face off in a debate about superheroes judged by University of Southern California debate director Gordon Stables and actors Kevin Smith and Jason Mewes.; Reward: The winners are given indoor skydiving sessions.; Nerd-Off: Two contestants battle in a trivia contest about superheroes. Each correct answer allows them to break through one of four walls. The first player to answer four questions correctly and subsequently break all four walls is safe from elimination.
5	5	"High IQ's"	February 14, 2013	1.23
Nerd War: The teams assemble a giant Rubik's Cube puzzle with numbers on various faces. Once the puzzle is complete, they must transfer the numbers to specific spaces in a Sudoku puzzle. The first team to complete the Sudoku puzzle is declared the winner.; Reward: The winning team earns an afternoon in an advanced flight simulator, engaging in a virtual dogfight.; Nerd-Off: Two players compete in a variation of the memory game Concentration, matching pairs of objects until no more pairs are possible. The player with the most matches wins.
6	6	"Nerdy Dancing"	February 21, 2013	1.05
Nerd War: The teams are tasked with creating "nerd anthems". The contestants work with Jingle Jarod to record their songs, and with Lauren Gottlieb and Tabitha and Napoleon D'umo of So You Think You Can Dance to learn their choreography. The teams' songs are judged by Garfunkel and Oates and MC Frontalot.; Reward: The winners earn an afternoon at Sky Zone, an indoor trampoline park.; Nerd-Off: Two nerds compete in a dance battle using the video game Dance Central 3. The player with the most points is named the winner.; Note: Following the Nerd-Off, teams are officially dissolved and subsequent Nerd Wars become individual challenges.
7	7	"Enginerds"	February 28, 2013	1.49
Nerd War: The players are given several examples of how many panes of glass are broken by various falling objects in a vertical array, and are told to use math and physics to estimate how many panes of glass will be broken in several other configurations given data like object weight and glass thickness. Each of these tests are then performed, and players are penalized for the difference in the actual panes broken versus their estimate. The player with the lowest overall penalty is declared the winner.; Reward: The winner, and a player of their choice, enjoys a molecular gastronomy preparation by celebrity chef Richard Blais.; Nerd-Off: Two players are given a large number of nerd-related objects, such as books, video game consoles, and Rubik's Cubes, and challenged to build the tallest free-standing tower in a fixed amount of time. Each player is given a Nerf gun with limited ammo to attempt to knock over the other player's tower. In the end, the player with the tallest structure is safe from elimination.
8	8	"The King Is Crowned"	March 7, 2013	1.54
Nerd War: In the first phase, the four remaining nerds race on Segways through a maze. The last player to finish is eliminated from the competition.; Nerd War: In the second phase, the final three players compete in a quiz bowl based on various nerd topics. The first two contestants to answer five questions correctly move on to the final Nerd-Off.; Nerd-Off: The eliminated contestants return to vote on which of the final two competitors should be crowned "King of the Nerds". The two finalists are given the opportunity, overnight, to convince the others to vote for them. The results are revealed after all votes had been placed, and the winner is named.
