= Wikirage =

Wikipedia analytics website

- Website type: Web analytics
- Available in: English; German; French; Japanese; Spanish
- Owner: Craig "W3ace" Wood
- Creator: Craig "W3ace" Wood
- Website: http://www.wikirage.com
- Commercial: yes
- Registration: no
- Launched: September 2007
- Current status: "sabbatical"

Wikirage was a website that provided an overview of the most heavily edited articles on Wikipedia, an online encyclopedia that allows almost any Internet user to edit almost all of its articles. "Editing" includes writing new articles, adding content, or deleting content. Wikirage allowed people to track the top 100 articles which were edited on Wikipedia within the last hour, day, week, or month. The creation of Wikirage coincided with the English Wikipedia reaching 2 million articles and WikiScanner attaining mainstream publicity.

== Methodology ==
Wikirage used the edit stream on Wikipedia to find out what is "hot and trendy" in popular culture. Ignoring automatic Robots ("bots") and Minor Edits (e.g., corrections of typographical errors), the stream will provide 500 edits a page, spread over a 5 to 10 minute time frame. The second step is to visit the page editing for every entry that is found in the list. All of these actions were logged in a database. To give some background to the edits, a synopsis of each Wikipedia Page is pulled to look for flags on the page like cleanup and current event. One more piece of contextual data is captured by capturing all links from the Wikipedia home page and the Featured Articles Archive.

A summarization routine was then used to build the lists of what's "hot" on the website. These routines were run 6-10 times an hour for the data points of 1, 6, 24, and 72 hours. The summarizer analytics for weekly and monthly data were run once a day. Undo, Reversion, and Vandalism were recorded separately in the edit trail. Total Edits and Unique Editors were exactly what they describe. Quality Edits is the Total Edits minus Undos and Reversions.
