= Wiki-Watch =

German university project for transparency of Wikipedia

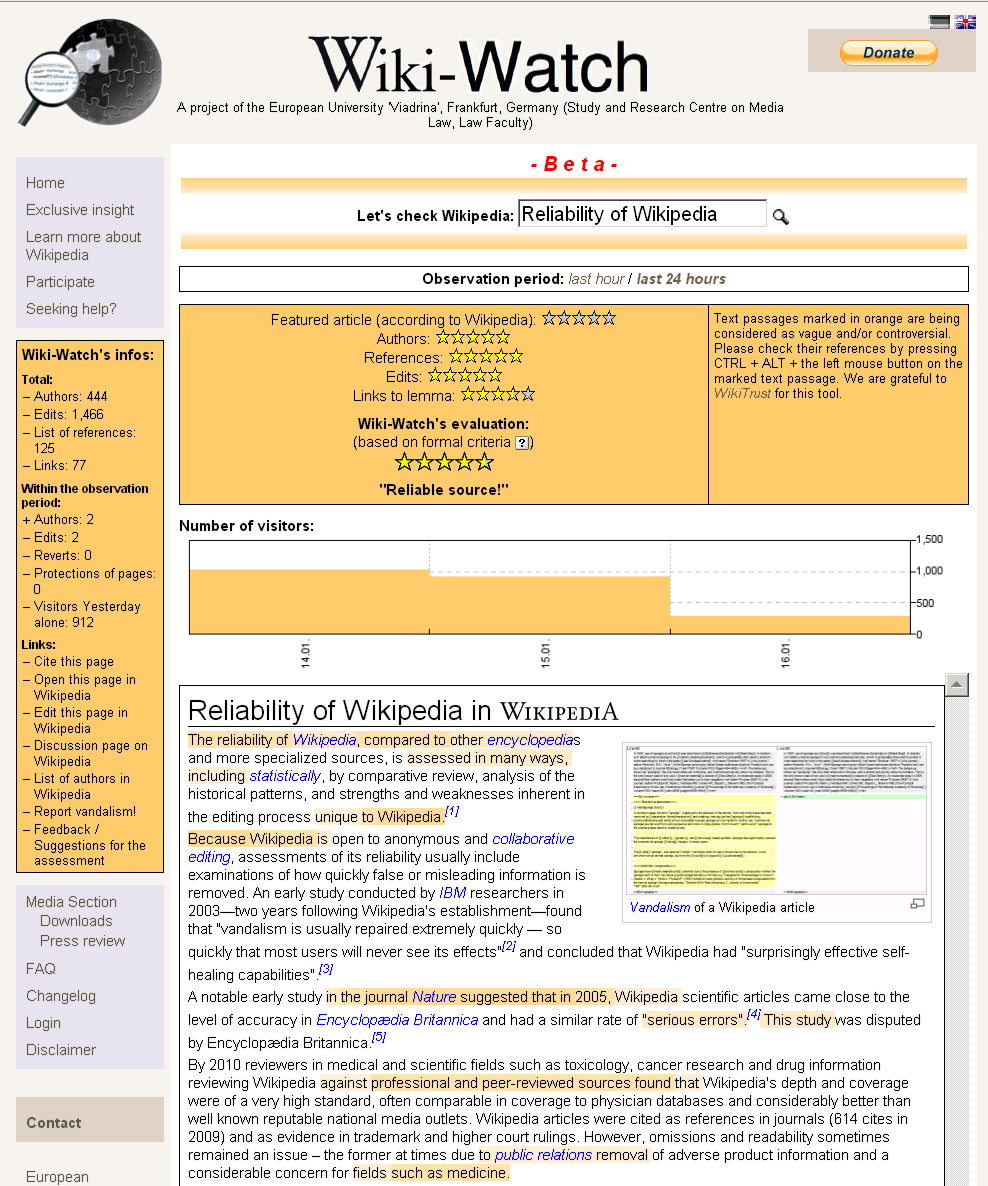
- Screenshot of Wiki-Watch rating a Wikipedia article. The orange text passages are rated "not trustworthy" by WikiTrust.
- Developers: Wiki-Watch project group at the European University "Viadrina", Germany under the leadership of Wolfgang Stock and Johannes Weberling
- Release: November 2011; 15 years ago
- Platform: Web browser (Web app)
- Type: Recommender system
- License: CC BY-SA 3.0 (Content only)
- Website: wiki-watch.org

Wiki-Watch, formally known as Arbeitsstelle Wiki-Watch im "Studien- und Forschungsschwerpunkt Medienrecht" der Juristischen Fakultät der Europa-Universität Viadrina (English: Wiki-Watch Project at the "Study and Research Centre on Media Law" from the Faculty of Law at Viadrina European University) is a German university project for transparency of Wikipedia and Wikipedia articles, aimed especially at media professionals.

Wiki-Watch conducted and published a survey of administrators of German Wikipedia and blogs regularly about German Wikipedia problems. Wiki-Watch's site wiki-watch.org provides statistical insights on Wikipedia.

Part of Wiki-Watch.org is a free software application for page analysis. This tool automatically assesses the formal reliability of Wikipedia articles in English and German. It produces a five-level evaluation score corresponding to its assessment of reliability. Second, its "Exclusive Insight" shows what is occurring in Wikipedia in nearly realtime. The Wiki-Watch blog spots current trends in Wikipedia and is a source of news coverage about the Wikipedia project.

Wiki-Watch was developed at the Viadrina European University in Frankfurt an der Oder, Germany. The development team included professors Wolfgang Stock and Johannes Weberling.

== Wiki-Watch's formal page analysis ==
Wiki-Watch's formal analysis relies on tracking each entry made in a Wikipedia article. It checks the number of sources, the number of editors and the number of links to the article. Within the additional implemented WikiTrust each editor is also given a "quality score" that assesses the reliability of their edits.

Hundreds of thousands of editors have contributed Wikipedia entries and the reliability of the information within Wikipedia has been the subject of debate among experts. Since 2009, the Wikimedia Foundation had been considering marking text that had not been reviewed or edited by multiple editors as "untested". This form of reliability checking could enhance acceptance of scholarly Wikipedia content within educational establishments.

Text tracking has incorporated into the WikiTrust system, in ongoing development at the University of California Santa Cruz and implemented in Wiki-Watch. Specific text fragments that have not been edited by multiple authors with a good score are flagged as potentially unreliable or unsafe. The reliability and reputation scoring system uses a color code scheme to evaluate pieces of text, based on the edit history and number of revisions by users, thereby signaling what may be unreliable changes within an article. The reliability of each editor is assessed by reviewing the changes they have made to various articles, and tracking their contributions to see how well the contributions survive after edits by other editors.

The page analysis is comparable to WikiBu with some differences. WikiTrust is more detailed than WikiBu. Wiki-Watch stresses more the quality of sources, while WikiBu stresses more the quantity of views over sources. Wiki-Watch is aimed at media professionals, while WikiBu is aimed on pupils and teachers.

== "Exclusive Insight" ==
In "Exclusive Insight" Wiki-Watch shows a compact overview of current Wikipedia developments (What and Who). Users can choose views between one hour and one month. A logged-in user can see more detailed statistics: most read pages, new pages, most edited pages, and so on. Additionally, graphs are supplied for the most read pages, displaying each day's views so that the reader sees if interest in an article is rising or ceasing. The "Exclusive Insight" displays edit wars and deletions, as well as the activities of administrators and power editors.

== Criticism of co-founder ==
In July 2011 the Frankfurter Allgemeine Zeitung newspaper published articles describing an alleged conflict of interest between co-founder Wolfgang Stock's work for Wiki-Watch and his work for a pharmaceutical company that was a client of his agency Convincet. Stock had last made edits to Wikipedia articles in the area of pharmaceuticals and health issues in spring 2009, which was one year before founding Wiki-Watch (late 2010) and two years before the accusation (July 2011).

In a formal reply in Der Spiegel, Stock refuted the allegations, calling them "wrong" and "false". Stock claimed that he had made his edits of entries related to a pharmaceutical company "before my consulting work for the pharmaceutical company." By his own admission, Stock's edits derived from personal interest and concern and were not paid by anybody. Only later, from summer 2009 on, he had worked as a communications consultant for the pharmaceutical company. "Given the ongoing legal dispute" on the accusation, Stock gave up his leadership position of Wiki-Watch and his access rights to its Internet platform, but remained a team-member in September 2011.

The Viadrina European University called the allegations "demonstrably false".

== See also ==
- Reliability of Wikipedia
- Wikiscanner
