= Tor2web =

HTTP proxy for Tor hidden services

- Original authors: Aaron Swartz, Virgil Griffith
- Developer: Hermes Center for Transparency and Digital Human Rights
- Initial release: 24 October 2008
- Final release: 3.2.0 / 1 October 2019; 6 years ago
- Repository: github.com/tor2web/Tor2web
- Written in: Python
- Operating system: Linux, Tails
- License: Affero General Public License
- Website: www.tor2web.org

Tor2web (pronounced "Tor to Web") is a software project to allow Tor hidden services to be accessed from a standard browser without being connected to the Tor network. It was created by Aaron Swartz and Virgil Griffith.

== History ==
Tor is a network which enables people to use the Internet anonymously (though with known weaknesses) and to publish content on "hidden services", which exist only within the Tor network for security reasons and thus are typically only accessible to the relatively small number of people using a Tor-connected web browser. Aaron Swartz and Virgil Griffith developed Tor2web in 2008 as a way to support whistleblowing and other forms of anonymous publishing through Tor, allowing materials to remain anonymous while making them accessible to a broader audience. In an interview with Wired Swartz explained that Tor is great for anonymous publishing, but because its focus is not user-friendliness and thus not many people would install it, he wanted to "produce this hybrid where people could publish stuff using Tor and make it so that anyone on the internet could view it".

The software developed by Swartz and Griffith is today considered version 1.0. Since then, it has been maintained and developed by Giovanni Pellerano from the Hermes Center for Transparency and Digital Human Rights as part of the GlobaLeaks Project, with financial support from the Open Technology Fund. Version 2.0 was released in August 2011, and version 3.0 is in beta as of December 2014.

== Operation and security ==
Rather than typical top-level domains like .com, .org, or .net, hidden service URLs end with .onion and are only accessible when connected to Tor. Tor2web acts as a specialized proxy or middleman between hidden services and users, making them visible to people who are not connected to Tor. To do so, a user takes the URL of a hidden service and replaces .onion with .onion.to.

Like Tor, Tor2web operates using servers run voluntarily by an open community of individuals and organizations.

Tor2web preserves the anonymity of content publishers but is not itself an anonymity tool and does not offer any protection to users beyond relaying data using HTTP Secure (HTTPS). Since version 2.0, a privacy and security warning is added to the header of each web page it fetches, encouraging readers to use the Tor Browser to obtain anonymity.

== See also ==
- Dark web
- Deep web
- Tor
