= King of the Nerds season 2 =

King of the Nerds
- Season 2
- No. of episodes: 8

Release
- Original network: TBS
- Original release: January 23 – March 13, 2014

Season chronology
- ← Previous; Season 1 Next → Season 3

The second season of King of the Nerds aired on TBS from January 23, 2014 to March 13, 2014. Inspired by the Revenge of the Nerds films, the season was hosted by actors and executive producers Robert Carradine and Curtis Armstrong, known for their roles as Lewis Skolnick and Dudley "Booger" Dawson, respectively, in Revenge of the Nerds.

== Contestants ==
Name	Hometown	Age	Specialty
Brian Davidson	Denver, Colorado	26	Historian
Chris Jackson	Waco, Texas	27	Mechanical engineer
Jack Hou	Ames, Iowa	24	Bioengineer
Josh Wittenkeller	Grayslake, Illinois	22	Pokémon Master
Katie Correll	Pittsburgh, Pennsylvania	23	Roboticist
Kayla LaFrance	Spokane, Washington	26	Rocket scientist
Kelsey Syers	Canton, Georgia	23	Japanophile
Mary Kate Smith	Starkville, Mississippi	23	Aerospace student
Nicole Evans	Milwaukee, Wisconsin	28	Inorganic chemist
Xander Jeanneret	Freedom, Wisconsin	26	Gamer
Zachary "Zack" Storch	Minneapolis, Minnesota	21	Fantasy writer

== Contestant progress ==
Contestant	Episode								
Contestant	1	2	3	4	5	6	7^{2}	8	
Kayla	IN	WIN	WIN	WIN	WIN	IN	WIN	WIN	WINNER
Jack	WIN	IN	IN	IN	RISK	WIN	RISK	WIN	RUNNER-UP
Brian	IN	WIN	WIN	WIN	WIN	RISK	IN	OUT^{3}	
Xander	IN	WIN	WIN	WIN	WIN	IN	IN	OUT^{3}	
Zack	WIN	RISK	RISK	RISK	IN	WIN	OUT		
Chris	RISK	WIN	WIN	WIN	WIN	OUT			
Katie	IN	WIN	WIN	IN^{1}	OUT				
Nicole	WIN	IN	IN	OUT					
Mary Kate	WIN	IN	OUT						
Josh	WIN	OUT							
Kelsey	OUT								

^Note 1: Katie was switched from Team Titans of Rigel to Team Midas Touch Attack.
^Note 2: Teams were dissolved and Nerd Wars became individual challenges.
^Note 3: The losers of the final Nerd War were automatically eliminated.

Key
(WINNER) The contestant won the competition and was crowned "King of the Nerds".
(RUNNER-UP) The contestant was the runner-up in the competition.
(WIN) The contestant won the Nerd War and received immunity from elimination.
(IN) The contestant lost the Nerd War, but was not selected to compete in the Nerd-Off.
(RISK) The contestant won the Nerd-Off and escaped elimination.
(OUT) The contestant lost the Nerd-Off and was eliminated from the competition.
Teams
The contestant was a member of Team Titans of Rigel.
The contestant was a member of Team Midas Touch Attack.

== Episodes ==
No. overall	No. in season	Title	Original release date	US viewers (Live + Same Day) (millions)
9	1	"In Search of a King"	January 23, 2014	1.03
Nerd War: Similar to the previous season, two players are randomly selected as captains to initiate a schoolyard pick to separate the contestants into teams, with one player left over. The unpicked player is given the power to eliminate another contestant from the competition and take their spot. Once selected, it is revealed that "being kicked out by somebody who wasn't even on a team" is nerdier than not being picked, and the nearly-ousted contestant is declared the "nerdiest of all nerds". This contestant joins the team of their choice, winning the challenge for their team, and sends another contestant to join the losing team.; Nerd-Off: Two players compete in a game inspired by Quidditch. After correctly answering a fantasy-themed question, the players are given the chance to ride a flying broomstick down a course and throw potion vials into cauldrons of varying point value. The contestant with the highest score at the end of five rounds is safe from elimination.
10	2	"Weird...Science?"	January 30, 2014	1.38
Nerd War: The teams present working model volcanos at the King of the Nerds Science Fair. The teams' performances are evaluated on the soundness of their science, their chemical reactions, and the creativity of their presentations by a judging panel consisting of science educator Bill Nye, 2011 Intel International Science and Engineering Fair winner Blake Marggraff, and The Big Bang Theory actress Mayim Bialik.; Reward: The winners get to spend one-on-one time with Bill Nye.; Nerd-Off: Two contestants are tested on their knowledge of anatomy in an alien autopsy challenge. As the hosts describe the function of a human organ, the players race to extract its alien equivalent from their respective cadavers. The first person to score three points is declared the winner.
11	3	"To LARP or Not to LARP"	February 6, 2014	0.97
Nerd War: The teams are challenged to a live action role-playing competition, requiring them to incorporate the same four characters into their performances: a warrior, a spell singer, a bard, and a monk. Each team must build costumes, create mythologies, and showcase their LARP in front of several judges, including actor Kevin Sorbo, cosplayer Yaya Han, and Napoleon Dynamite star Jon Heder.; Reward: The winning team enjoys an interactive dinner show at Pirate's Dinner Adventure.; Nerd-Off: Two nerds compete in a turn-based, strategy game called "BattleHammer". Each competitor is allowed to select an aide-de-camp from either team. The game begins with each player secretly placing 23 units on a grid according to their designated starting configurations, similar to Battleship. Each turn, the contestants roll a die to determine the number of moves they can make; they can then choose to either defend by moving their individual units, or attack by guessing the positions of their opponent's units. The game ends when a player loses all of their units.
12	4	"Ready, Set, Robot Dodgeball"	February 13, 2014	0.97
Nerd War: Each team is required to build four robots to battle in a game of dodgeball. The robots are first judged on their creativity and execution by Matt Winston, co-founder of the Stan Winston School of Character Arts. The team with the robots deemed the least impressive loses one of them for the challenge. During the dodgeball portion, one team maneuvers their robots around the court while the other team attempts to tag them out by throwing dodgeballs. The team with the fastest overall time after four rounds wins.; Reward: Each member of the winning team earns $1,000 worth of RadioShack gear.; Nerd-Off: Two contestants face off in a zombified version of KerPlunk. The players take turns pulling out large wooden stakes, dropping body parts to the zombies below. The first player to accidentally release 150 body parts to the zombies is eliminated from the competition.
13	5	"Trek Wars"	February 20, 2014	0.93
Nerd War: Three members from each team compete in a debate about Star Wars vs. Star Trek, judged by University of Southern California debate director Gordon Stables, comedian Kumail Nanjiani, and actor Billy Dee Williams. The team that successfully defends two out of three topics wins.; Reward: The winning team has dinner with the original cast of Revenge of the Nerds, including Brian Tochi, Larry B. Scott, Julia Montgomery, and hosts Carradine and Armstrong.; Nerd-Off: Two contestants' vocabulary and spelling skills are tested in a spelling bee competition. The hosts read off definitions of words prevalent in the "nerd universe". The first person to hit their buzzer must identify the word and spell it. Every correct answer earns the player one point, while every incorrect answer gives the opponent one point. In addition, the two nerds competing must select two other contestants to receive an electric shock for every incorrect answer. The first player to reach five points is safe from elimination.
14	6	"Nerds to the Rescue"	February 27, 2014	0.95
Nerd War: Two members from each team are tasked with navigating a laser maze to save guest star George Takei. One contestant must verbally guide their teammate, who is unable to see the lasers due to their spectrum-blocking goggles, through the maze. Once past the maze, the teams are required to answer a math question in order to unlock Takei's cell. The teams suffer a one-minute time delay for every tripped laser, in which the contestants must remain frozen in place. Every incorrect answer to the math problem incurs a 30-second time penalty. The team that successfully frees Takei from his cell wins.; Reward: The winning team visits the special effects studio Legacy Effects.; Nerd-Off: Two nerds battle in an intergalactic target shooting challenge. The players must first answer science fiction-related trivia questions; for every correct answer, the players earn 40 rounds of ammo to shoot down as many spaceship targets of varying point value as possible. The nerd with the highest score after six rounds is declared the winner.; Note: Following the Nerd-Off, teams are officially dissolved and subsequent Nerd Wars become individual challenges.
15	7	"Angry Nerds"	March 6, 2014	1.02
Nerd War: The contestants compete in a kart racing challenge inspired by Tron and Mario Kart. The players are awarded points based on their placement in the race. In addition, the players can drive over bonus stars that are randomly lit around the race track in order to receive bonus points. The contestant with the highest score after twelve laps wins.; Reward: The winner, and a player of their choice, receive telepresence robots from Double Robotics worth roughly $2,000 each.; Nerd-Off: Two nerds compete in a real-life game of Angry Birds. The players must first build miniature structures which, when scaled up to life-sized proportions, can withstand a barrage of projectiles. Once the structures have been built up to scale, the players take turns shooting at each other's creations using air cannons. The first person to knock down three balls from their opponent's structure wins.
16	8	"One Nerd to Rule Them All"	March 13, 2014	0.96
Nerd War: The contestants compete in a quiz bowl based on various nerd topics. The first two competitors to answer five questions correctly earn a spot in the final Nerd-Off.; Nerd-Off: The final two nerds compete in the "Nerdliminator", a gauntlet of eight "mental games" consisting of a mathematical puzzle, string puzzle, sliding puzzle, logic puzzle, Sudoku, cryptogram, word search, and Pac-Man. The finalists must petition the banished nerds to pledge their allegiance towards them; the eliminated contestants then choose which finalist to help during the challenge. The players have 20 minutes to complete as many games as possible, and may call for help from their supporters a total of three times. In the end, the player with the most correct answers is crowned "King of the Nerds".
