= Colby Burnett =

American game show contestant

- Born: Chicago, IL
- Occupation: Former World History instructor at Fenwick High School
- Employer: Fenwick High School
- Known for: Jeopardy! King of the Nerds
- Spouse: Janet Wasilewski (m. 2022)

Colby Burnett is the first Jeopardy! contestant to have won both the Teachers Tournament and the Tournament of Champions. Burnett, who at the time was a teacher at Fenwick High School in Oak Park, Illinois, won the Teachers Tournament in November 2012. A few months later in February 2013, Burnett won the show's Tournament of Champions, taking home the $250,000 grand prize. He later appeared on season 3 of TBS's reality game show King of the Nerds. Governor Pat Quinn named December 18 as "Colby Burnett Day" in Illinois. In 2014, Burnett competed in the Battle of the Decades, making it to the semifinals, where he lost to Roger Craig.

== Education ==
Burnett graduated from Fenwick High School. He then went on to get his BA from Northwestern University, double majoring in History and Political Science. Burnett then got his MEd in Reading Teacher Education from Dominican University.

== Early life ==
Burnett grew up in the Austin neighborhood of Chicago. He credits his mother with keeping him out of trouble, as well as enhancing his intellect by buying him an encyclopedia, which Burnett has read from cover to cover. After winning Jeopardy!, Burnett bought his mother a new home in a better area of Chicago. When asked what the greatest accomplishment of his life was, Burnett stated, "knowing a duke of Sealand."

Preceded by Patrick Quinn	Jeopardy! Teachers Tournament winner 2012	Succeeded by John Pearson
Preceded by Roger Craig	Jeopardy! Tournament of Champions winner 2013	Succeeded by Ben Ingram
