= BuyCostumes.com =

Costume retailer headquartered in New Berlin, Wisconsin

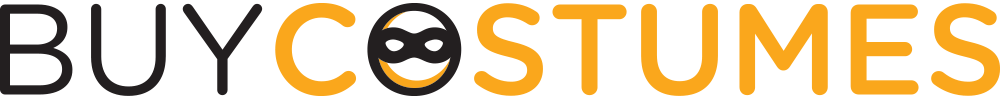
- Industry: Retail
- Founded: 1999
- Headquarters: New Berlin, Wisconsin
- Key people: Rick Barton CEO
- Products: Costumes, party supplies, Halloween décor, Halloween costumes
- Parent: BuySeasons Inc. (Rubie's)
- Website: www.buycostumes.com

BuyCostumes.com is a US-based costume retailer headquartered in New Berlin, Wisconsin. It is an e-commerce company that sells costumes and costume accessories for children, adults, and pets. The retailer also sells party supplies for year-round occasions and seasonal indoor/outdoor décor. It is part of a family of costume and party brands owned by a larger corporate entity, BuySeasons Inc. that includes CostumeExpress.com and BirthdayExpress.com. BuySeasons Inc. is a subsidiary of Rubie's Costume Company.

BuyCostumes.com refers to itself as "The Online Leader in Halloween Costumes since 1999", offering more than 10 billion costume and accessory combinations.

== History ==
=== 1999–2009 ===
BuyCostumes.com and its parent company “BuySeasons Inc.”, were founded in 1999 by Jalem Getz and business partner Jon Majdoch as an online retailer of costumes and seasonal items. Originally located in Waukesha, the firm moved its corporate headquarters and distribution center to New Berlin as it expanded, which is where it resides today.

In August 2006 Liberty Media Corporation purchased BuySeasons Inc., at which point it became a wholly owned subsidiary of Liberty Media. In 2008, Liberty Media acquired Celebrate Express, parent of BirthdayExpress.com, and combined it with BuySeasons Inc.

=== 2010s ===
In December 2010, Getz left the company, turning over control to Dan Haight, who became President & CEO. Getz would later file suit against BuySeasons Inc. in 2011, alleging that the company had failed to honor various compensation agreements.

In October 2011, BuyCostumes.com earned a Guinness World Record for the most people dressed as video game characters. The company assembled 425 of its employees to attempt the record. Costumes used in the record attempt were pre-approved by Guinness World Records.

Dev Mukherjee, former SVP and President of Sears Holdings’ Home Appliances for stores and online, became the CEO of BuySeasons Inc. in 2013. Mukherjee was replaced the following year by Leisure Arts CEO Rick Barton, marking the company's third CEO change in four years.

In 2014, Liberty Interactive spun off BuySeasons Inc. and its stake in TripAdvisor into a new company, Liberty TripAdvisor Holdings. In 2017, Liberty TripAdvisor Holdings sold BuySeasons Inc. to costume manufacturer Rubie's Costume Company. In 2020, Rubie's filed for Chapter 11 bankruptcy protection, blaming the COVID-19 pandemic.

== Facilities ==
BuyCostumes.com, as a part of parent company BuySeasons Inc. operates out of a 472,000 sq. ft. corporate headquarters in New Berlin, Wisconsin (near Milwaukee). The company also operates a satellite facility in Bothell, Washington that employs a product development team. The New Berlin campus houses the core of the company’s professional offices and its call center, as well as its warehouse and distribution/manufacturing center. The workforce employed at the campus annually quadruples in the weeks around Halloween to account for increased seasonal demand.

== In Media ==
BuyCostumes.com provided costumes for a cosplay and LARP challenge on the Season 2 episode "To LARP or Not to LARP" of the TBS reality competition show, King of the Nerds. Contestants were required to create and perform a short LARP scene as four original characters and be judged by a celebrity panel. BuyCostumes.com was featured during a similar challenge on the Season 3 episode "And Now For Something Completely Different," and also provided the prizes for the members of the winning team.

== Orange Tuesday ==
In 2013, BuySeasons Inc. filed the wordmark “Orange Tuesday” with the United States Trademark and Patent Office for use on BuyCostumes.com. The concept of Orange Tuesday is used by the retailer to denote the Tuesday after Labor Day as the beginning of the Halloween season. According to CEO Dev Mukherjee, the movement was intended to spearhead the shopping season alongside all retailers, including brick-and-mortar firms such as Target and the competing Party City. Other Wisconsin-based companies such as Mills Fleet Farm and Lakefront Brewery have been known to participate in the trend of using colors to name various shopping seasons.

=== Response ===
Media reception to Orange Tuesday has been mixed. Some critics, such as Nedra Rhone of The Atlanta Journal-Constitution and Adam Tschorn of the Los Angeles Times, questioned the seasonal relevance of a Halloween-based event in September, while Rieva Lesonsky of SmallBizDaily.com remarked that it may be a “smart move,” considering Halloween’s growing popularity.
