= BirthdayExpress.com =

Defunct American online retailer

- Company type: Subsidiary
- Industry: Retail
- Founded: 1994
- Defunct: 2008
- Fate: Acquired
- Successor: CelebrateExpress.com then merged with Liberty Media
- Headquarters: New Berlin, Wisconsin
- Key people: Rick Barton, CEO
- Products: Party supplies and party decorations, costumes
- Owner: Liberty Media
- Parent: BuySeasons Inc. (Rubie's)
- Website: www.birthdayexpress.com

BirthdayExpress.com was an American online retailer based in New Berlin, Wisconsin, that sold party supplies and decorations specifically for, but not limited to, children's birthdays. It was renamed as CelebrateExpress.com in early 2000s and was acquired by Liberty Media in 2008.

BirthdayExpress.com also powered the party store on the social planning web service Evite, which along with BirthdayExpress.com's parent company BuySeasons Inc., which was owned by Rubie's Costume Company. BuySeasons Inc. was also responsible for the related family of retail sites including BuyCostumes.com, CostumeExpress.com, CelebrateExpress.com and 1stWishes.com.

== History ==
=== 1990s ===
Birthday Express was founded in Kirkland, Washington by the team of Engineering Animation employee Mike Jewell and his wife, Jan Jewell, in June 1994. The couple, inspired by the birth of their third child, funded the start-up with $1.5 million of their personal savings. Initially, the company operated on a purely mail-order catalog business model before launching its first website in 1996. BirthdayExpress.com was responsible for a third of the company's orders by 1999.

After a five-year period that saw a nearly five-fold increase in the number of orders, (from 44,000 in 1995 to 200,000 in 1998), Birthday Express received over $13 million in new investment capital from ARCH Venture Partners, Advanced Technology Ventures, and Sigma Partners in 1999. Later that year, CelebrateExpress.com was created for the purpose of selling adult-themed and holiday-focused party products, and Birthday Express expanded its distribution capacity with the leasing of a 32,000 square-foot warehouse in Greensboro, North Carolina.

=== 2000s ===
Birthday Express officially changed its name to CelebrateExpress.com in early 2000, and also announced preparations for an initial public offering on NASDAQ with the goal of raising $40 million. These preparations were abandoned in August of that year, following the poor performance of public competitors' stocks. CelebrateExpress.com opted to raise funds from other sources, raising $14 million by August 2001.

CelebrateExpress.com continued to expand its family of brands by purchasing Storybook Heirlooms in 2001 from Storybook, Inc., a clothing-retailer aimed at pre-teen girls, and by creating Costume Express in 2003. At this time, BirthdayExpress.com was mailing 12 million catalogs annually and receiving 1 million monthly visits.

Kevin Green was hired as the CelebrateExpress.com CEO in 2006.

In 2008, Liberty Media purchased CelebrateExpress.com for the purpose of merging it with its own e-commerce subsidiary, BuySeasons, Inc.

=== 2010s ===
BirthdayExpress.com, as a part of Liberty Media, became a brand managed on equal footing with Celebrate Express and Costume Express, as well as BuySeasons' BuyCostumes.com. In December 2010, Dan Haight replaced Jalem Getz as CEO and President of BuySeasons. He would be later replaced, in turn, by Dev Mukherjee, former SVP and President of Sears Holdings’ Home Appliances for stores and online, in 2013.

== Facilities ==
BirthdayExpress.com operated out of a 472,000 sq. ft. corporate headquarters in New Berlin, Wisconsin. The company also operated a satellite facility in Bothell, Washington that employed a creative and product development team. The New Berlin campus housed the core of the company’s professional offices and its call center, as well as its warehouse and distribution/manufacturing center.

== 1stWishes.com ==
1stWishes.com was a separate retailing brand belonging to BuySeasons that was first created in 2006 to cater specifically to first birthdays. The website was relaunched in 2013 as "1stWishes.com by Birthday Express."
