= Virgil Griffith =

American computer programmer

- Born: March 6, 1983 (age 43); Birmingham, Alabama, United States
- Other name: Romanpoet
- Education: California Institute of Technology
- Occupations: Programmer, Internet and software researcher
- Known for: Ethereum development, Tor2web, WikiScanner
- Conviction: Conspiracy to violate the International Emergency Economic Powers Act (50 U.S.C. § 1705)
- Penalty: 63 months imprisonment (2022); $100,000 fine
- Website: virgil.gr

Virgil Griffith (born 1983) is an American programmer. He worked extensively on the Ethereum cryptocurrency platform, designed the Tor2web proxy along with Aaron Swartz, and created the Wikipedia indexing tool WikiScanner. He has published papers on artificial life and integrated information theory. Griffith was arrested in 2019 and in 2021 pleaded guilty to conspiring to violate U.S. laws relating to money laundering using cryptocurrency and sanctions related to North Korea. On April 12, 2022, Griffith was sentenced to 63 months imprisonment for assisting North Korea with evading sanctions.

== Life ==
Griffith was born in Birmingham, Alabama and grew up in nearby Tuscaloosa. He graduated from the Alabama School of Math and Science in 2002, and then attended the University of Alabama, studying cognitive science. He transferred to Indiana University Bloomington in 2004, but returned to graduate cum laude from Alabama in August 2007. In 2008, he was a visiting researcher at the Santa Fe Institute. In 2014 Griffith received his Ph.D. from the California Institute of Technology under Christof Koch in computation and neural systems with funding from the U.S. Departments of Energy and Homeland Security. He has been a research scientist at the Ethereum Foundation since 2016. At the time of his arrest in 2019, Griffith was a resident of Singapore and was allegedly investigating the possibility of renouncing his U.S. citizenship.

== Computer career ==
Griffith has given talks at the hacker conferences Interz0ne, PhreakNIC, and HOPE.

At Interz0ne 1 in 2002, he met Billy Hoffman, a Georgia Tech student, who had discovered a security flaw in the campus magnetic ID card system called "BuzzCard". He and Hoffman collaborated to study the flaw and attempted to give a talk about it at Interz0ne 2 in April 2003. A few hours before the presentation, he and Hoffman were served with a cease and desist order from corporate lawyers acting for Blackboard Inc. Two days later, it was followed by a lawsuit alleging that they had stolen trade secrets and violated both the Digital Millennium Copyright Act and the Economic Espionage Act. The lawsuit was settled later that year.

On August 14, 2007, Griffith released a software utility, WikiScanner, that tracked Wikipedia article edits from unregistered accounts back to their originating IP addresses and identified the corporations or organizations to which they belonged. Griffith described his mission in developing WikiScanner as "to create minor public-relations disasters for companies and organizations I dislike."

In 2008, together with Aaron Swartz, Griffith designed the Tor2web proxy. In 2016, he was fired from the Tor team for attempting to sell de-anonymized Tor2web traffic.

On Ethereum, Griffith writes Ethereum "is an unprecedented arena for playing cooperative games", and "enables powerful economic vehicles we don't yet understand", by bringing cooperative game theory into new domains. As of 2019 Griffith's homepage stated that he worked for the Ethereum Foundation.

== Inaugural Pyongyang Blockchain and Cryptocurrency Conference ==
In mid 2018, Griffith was one of a number of international cryptocurrency experts invited to attend a conference in Pyongyang, North Korea. His invitation to the conference and his entry to North Korea was facilitated by an American businessman, Christopher Emms, and North Korean political activist Alejandro Cao de Benós. Griffith agreed to participate, despite being denied application for special validation he required to attend by the US State Department, and the resulting need for him to take an unusual route to enter the country.

Once the eight foreign delegates arrived in Pyongyang, their passports were confiscated following the discovery by North Korean security staff of a home-made pornographic video on one of the delegates' laptops. Over five initial days of tours including local businesses and a foreign language school that had little or no connection to cryptocurrency, the conference itself began at Pyongyang's Sci-Tech Complex, which the delegates observed to contain technology largely obsolete in the rest of the world. The speakers were presented with brief instructions on topics approved for discussion which appeared to have been sourced from the internet, was already in the public domain, and so seemed insufficient to justify holding a conference. Resorting to improvisation, the delegates spoke impromptu about what they had been told to discuss, to an audience comprising officials who appeared not to understand and some of whom slept through the presentations. Shortly afterwards, the delegates were bussed to the airport, their passports were returned, and they flew home.

== Prosecution ==
Since approximately 2010, North Korea is believed to have funded many of its weapons programs and the luxury lifestyles of its leadership through cybercriminal activities including the Lazarus Group. Pursuant to the IEEPA and Executive Order 13466, U.S. persons are prohibited from exporting any goods, services or technology to North Korea without a license from the Department of the Treasury's Office of Foreign Assets Control (OFAC) and it is illegal to conspire with U.S. persons to do the same. On his return to the US, Griffith was alleged to have discussed at the conference means through which North Korea could use cryptocurrency to evade economic sanctions and, on November 28, 2019, he was arrested by the Federal Bureau of Investigation for providing "highly technical information to North Korea, knowing that this information could be used to help North Korea launder money and evade sanctions".

Ethereum co-founder Vitalik Buterin initiated an online campaign for Griffith's release which, according to one source, could not garner many supporters. Subsequently, Griffith was imposed with a 10-year export privilege ban by The United States Department of Commerce.

On September 28, 2021, Griffith pleaded guilty at a hearing in which he expressed remorse. He was sentenced on April 12, 2022, to 63 months in prison, with 10 months already considered time served from his pre-trial detention. From July 2022 he was in FCI Allenwood Low, a low-security federal prison in Pennsylvania. His personal page indicated that he moved to FCI Milan, a low security prison in Milan, Michigan. Griffith was released from prison on April 9, 2025.

== Writing ==
- Virgil Griffith, Markus Jakobsson, 2005. Messin' with Texas: Deriving Mother's Maiden Names Using Public Records. ISBN 3-540-26223-7.
- Virgil Griffith, Larry S. Yaeger, 2005, MIT Press. Ideal Free Distribution in Agents with Evolved Neural Architectures. Indiana University School of Informatics and Department of Cognitive Science.
- Griffith is listed as one of the contributors (as "Virgil G") in Elonka Dunin (2006). The Mammoth Book of Secret Codes And Cryptograms. Carroll & Graf. ISBN 0-7867-1726-2.
- Two articles in Markus Jakobsson, Steven Myers (2007) Phishing and Counter-Measures: Understanding the Increasing Problem of Electronic Identity Theft. Wiley-Interscience. ISBN 0-471-78245-9.

== See also ==
- King of the Nerds, a reality competition series on which Griffith was a contestant
