= Celeste Anderson =

Canadian competitive gamer

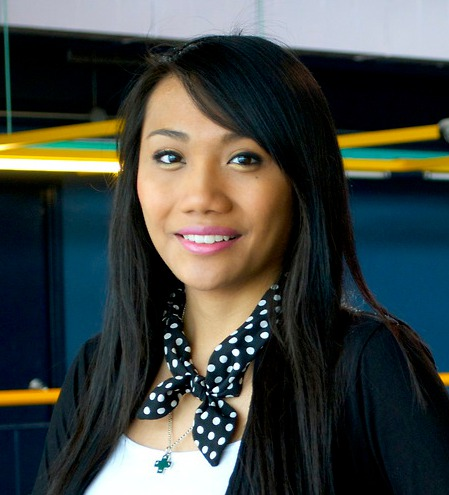
- Born: September 6, 1989 (age 36); Winnipeg, Manitoba, Canada
- Other name: BiiTTERSWEET

Celeste Anderson (also known as BiiTTERSWEET) is a Canadian competitive gamer and reality television personality, known for being the winner of the first season of the TBS reality show King of the Nerds for which she was awarded $100,000.

== Personal life ==
Celeste Anderson was born in Winnipeg, Manitoba in 1989, and moved to Orillia, Ontario in 1996. Anderson attended the University of Waterloo, where she majored in computer science.

Anderson enjoys speed-solving the Rubik's Cube, for which she has attended several competitions in Canada. Her best WCA official times are 20.78 seconds (single) and 22.27 seconds (3 of 5 average).

== Competitive gaming ==
Anderson is most well known for her skill in first-person shooter games, notably the Halo series in which she played semi-professionally for some time. She is known as one of Canada's best female video game players.

== King of the Nerds ==
Anderson competed in and won the first season of TBS's reality TV show King of the Nerds, which aired in 2013. Anderson was a member of the Blextrophy team (formerly the Blue team).

To promote her appearance on that series, she was a guest on the late-night TV talk show Conan on February 12, 2013. She later made a cameo appearance in the second-season premiere of the show.

== See also ==
- List of University of Waterloo people
