= Comic Con (disambiguation) =

Comic Con may refer to:

- Comic-Con (with hyphen), a registered trademark owned by San Diego Comic-Con
- Comic Con, a list of comic-book conventions around the world
- Comic book convention (or comic-con), a meeting of comic-book fans, creators, and publishers

== See also ==
- Comecon (band), a Swedish death-metal band
