= King of the Nerds =

American reality competition series

- Genre: Reality competition
- Presented by: Robert Carradine; Curtis Armstrong
- Country of origin: United States
- Original language: English
- No. of seasons: 3
- No. of episodes: 24

Production
- Executive producers: Anthony Carbone; Ben Silverman; Charles Wachter; Christopher Grant; Corie Henson; Craig Armstrong; Curtis Armstrong; Rick Ringbakk; Robert Carradine
- Running time: 40 to 43 minutes
- Production companies: 5x5 Media; Electus

Original release
- Network: TBS
- Release: January 17, 2013 – March 13, 2015

King of the Nerds is an American reality competition series co-produced by Electus and 5x5 Media. It was inspired by the Revenge of the Nerds films. The show is hosted by actors and executive producers Robert Carradine and Curtis Armstrong, known for their roles as Lewis Skolnick and Dudley "Booger" Dawson, respectively, in Revenge of the Nerds. The series premiered on January 17, 2013, on TBS. The show features nerds and geeks with diverse backgrounds and interests competing in various challenges for a cash prize of $100,000 and the title of "King of the Nerds". Following a three-season run, the series was cancelled by TBS.

== Premise ==
King of the Nerds follows contestants as they compete in a series of intellectual challenges to win a $100,000 prize. The show uses a progressive elimination format. The contestants are initially separated into two teams. In each episode, the contestants compete in a team challenge called the "Nerd War". The winners of the Nerd War are granted immunity from elimination and typically receive a reward for their victory. Two players from the losing team are then selected to compete in a head-to-head elimination challenge called the "Nerd-Off"; one player is selected by vote from the losing team, while the other is selected by vote from the winning team. The loser of the Nerd-Off is eliminated from the competition. Upon reaching the penultimate episode, the teams are officially disbanded.

The series has used different finale formats over its first two seasons. In the first season, the eliminated competitors returned as a jury to vote for the winner of the competition. However, in response to controversy over the use of what fans deem to be a "popularity contest", the winners from the second season onward were determined through challenges rather than a jury vote (with eliminated players supporting their chosen finalist in the final challenge).

== Development and production ==
The concept for a reality television show based on Revenge of the Nerds was originally pitched by Curtis Armstrong and Robert Carradine in the mid-2000s. However, the idea gained little traction at the time, owing to the then-running reality television program Beauty and the Geek. According to Armstrong, networks felt that having "two nerd shows would be a drag on the market." After roughly six years passed, Armstrong and Carradine decided to pitch the show again, and were met with more immediate responses. After finding ratings success with its syndicated reruns of the recently acquired The Big Bang Theory, TBS green-lit King of the Nerds in March 2012. Designed as a companion series for The Big Bang Theory, the show was the network's first unscripted competition series in seven years. The first season was shot on the campus of Ambassador College in Pasadena, California. To promote the new series, contestant Celeste Anderson appeared on the February 12, 2013, episode of Conan.

TBS ordered a second season of King of the Nerds in February 2013. It was filmed at Occidental College in Los Angeles, California, after the production staff were unable to secure the location from the previous year. Season 2 premiered on January 23, 2014. Preliminary casting for a potential third season began in April 2014. In June 2014, TBS formally announced the show's renewal. Filming, once again taking place at Occidental College, began in late July 2014 and concluded in early August. In promotion of the season, TBS partnered with Twitch for a preview screening of the season's first episode and a chat session with hosts Armstrong and Carradine on January 16, 2015, marking Twitch's first live television viewing event. Season 3 premiered on January 23, 2015.

On September 4, 2015, Armstrong announced that the show would not return for a fourth season, tweeting the message: "Dearest Nerds! Deeply sorry to announce that @KingOfNerdsTBS will not be returning for a 4th season. Hard to find words now. #NerdsRule" The show's cancellation has been attributed to Turner Broadcasting System's rebranding project for TBS and the resultant changes to the channel's comedy programming.

=== The People's Nerd ===
On April 24, 2013, TBS announced that they were holding a contest for the public to select one of the Season 2 cast members called "The People's Nerd". The contest ran simultaneously with regular casting and had people submit videos to the King of the Nerds Facebook page. The candidates were voted on by the public until one person was chosen to compete. On October 9, 2013, Josh "JWittz" Wittenkeller, a YouTube personality who posts Nintendo-related content, was announced to be the winner of the contest and crowned The People's Nerd.

== Series overview ==
| Season | Episodes | Originally released | |
| Season | Episodes | First released | Last released |
|---|---|---|---|
| 1 | 8 | January 17, 2013 | March 7, 2013 |
| 2 | 8 | January 23, 2014 | March 13, 2014 |
| 3 | 8 | January 23, 2015 | March 13, 2015 |

== Reception ==
King of the Nerds debuted to primarily lukewarm reviews. Brian Lowry of Variety criticized the premiere episode for its "numbing lack of imagination", stating that "even the inspired casting of Robert Carradine and Curtis Armstrong as hosts can't make this more than a bored game of groans." Matt Roush of TV Guide expressed similar apathy, calling the opener a "tedious affair" that was "all fairly harmless, but instantly forgettable." Neil Genzlinger of The New York Times gave the show a slightly more positive rating, saying that "the competitors may not be all that amusing, but some of the show's gimmicks are." Allison Keene of The Hollywood Reporter provided a positive review, finding King of the Nerds to be "an entertaining competition show" that "strikes the right tone by neither making fun of nor blindly praising the competitors for their quirks (of which they have many)."

=== Ratings ===
The first season of King of the Nerds premiered to 2 million total viewers on January 17, 2013, with 1.2 million adults 18–49 and 586,000 adults 18–34. Through its first three episodes, the show averaged 2.1 million viewers, with 1.3 million adults 18–49 and 670,000 adults 18–34 in Live+7. The second season saw a decline in viewership, averaging 1.5 million viewers per episode and more than 1 million in the key adults 18–49 demographic. Across TBS's various platforms, Season 2 averaged 4 million total viewers. This trend continued through Season 3 after its switch from a Thursday night time slot to the "Friday night death slot", with the show reaching an average of 2.7 million viewers across TBS's linear, digital, and mobile platforms.

== International syndication ==
Electus International, the global distribution arm of Electus, distributes King of the Nerds internationally. On January 14, 2013, Canadian network Slice announced that it had acquired the series from Electus International. The first season premiered on January 23, 2013, while the second season aired on January 29, 2014. The series debuted in Australia on Network Ten and Eleven on March 23, 2014. The second season is slated to air on Channel V Australia on August 4, 2015.

== British adaptation ==
On July 31, 2014, British Sky Broadcasting channel Sky 1 announced that it had ordered a British adaptation of King of the Nerds for the United Kingdom. The UK version, produced by Objective Productions, was hosted by British television presenter Konnie Huq and was narrated by Greg McHugh. The show ran for one season, from July 12 to August 30, 2015.
