= WikiTrust =

Software to assist in detecting vandalism and dubious edits

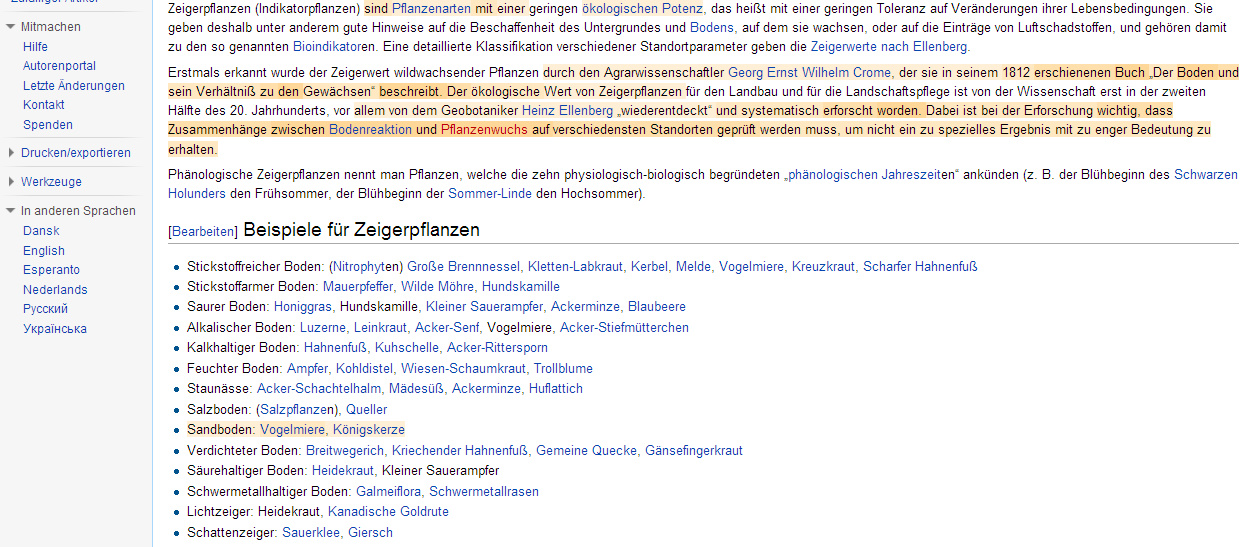
- An example of a WikiTrust screenshot
- Developer: UCSC Online Collaboration Lab
- Stable release: v2.12 / November 19, 2008
- Preview release: v3.0.pre1 / August 21, 2009
- Written in: PHP, OCaml
- Platform: FireFox, MediaWiki
- Type: MediaWiki plug-in
- License: BSD, GPL
- Website: wikitrust.soe.ucsc.edu
- Repository: github.com/collaborativetrust/WikiTrust

WikiTrust was a software product, available as a Firefox Plugin, which aimed to assist editors in detecting vandalism and dubious edits by highlighting the "untrustworthy" text with a yellow or orange background. As of September 2017, the server is offline, but the code is still available for download.

When the UCSC server was active, WikiTrust assessed the credibility of content and author reputation of wiki articles using an automated algorithm. WikiTrust provides a plug-in for servers using the MediaWiki platform, such as Wikipedia. When installed, it was designed to enable users of that website to obtain information about the author, origin, and reliability of that website's wiki text. Content that is stable, based on an analysis of article history, should be displayed in normal black-on-white type, and content that is not stable is highlighted in varying shades of yellow or orange. It was formerly available for several language versions of Wikipedia.

WikiTrust on Wikipedia was undertaken by the Online Collaboration Lab at the University of California, Santa Cruz, in response to a Meta-wiki quality initiative sponsored by the Wikimedia Foundation. The project, discussed at Wikimania 2009, was one of a number of quality/rating tools for Wikipedia content that the Wikimedia Foundation was considering. Communications of the ACM (August 2011) had an article on it. WikiTrust is designed for English and German use via the Wiki-Watch pagedetails for Wikipedia articles, in several languages via a Firefox plugin or it can be installed in any MediaWiki configuration. By 2012, WikiTrust appeared to be inactive.

== Software application ==
=== Computing reliability ===
WikiTrust computes, for each word, three pieces of information:

- The author of the word.
- The revision where the word (and the immediately surrounding text) was inserted. By clicking on a word, visitors are sent to the revision where the word originated.
- The "trust" of the word, indicated by the word background coloring (orange for "untrusted" text, white for "trusted" text).

The trust of the word is computed according to how much the word, and the surrounding text, have been revised by users that WikiTrust considers of "high authority." This project is still in a beta test stage.

=== Criticism ===
The criticism has been raised that "the software doesn't really measure trustworthiness, and the danger is that people will trust the software to measure something that it does not." Generally, users whose content persists for a long time without being "reverted" by other editors are deemed more trustworthy by the software. This may mean that users who edit controversial articles subject to frequent reversion may be found to be less trustworthy than others. The software uses a variation of Levenshtein distance to measure how much of user's edit is kept or rearranged, so that users can receive "partial credit" for their work.

=== Community bias ===
The software has also been described as measuring the amount of consensus in an article. The community of editors collaborate on articles and revise each other until agreement is reached. Users who make edits which are more similar to the final agreement will receive more reputation. The point is also made that consensus revolves around the beliefs of the community, so that the reputation computed is also a reflection of the community.

== See also ==
- Artificial intelligence in Wikimedia projects
- Flagged Revisions
- Reliability of Wikipedia
