= WikiScanner =

Defunct database linking Wikipedia edits to institutions

- Screenshot of the website on August 22, 2007
- Website type: Database tool
- Available in: Chinese, Dutch, English, French, German, Italian, Japanese, Polish
- Owner: Virgil Griffith
- Creator: Virgil Griffith
- Website: wikiscanner.virgil.gr Virgil Griffith's virgil.gr (current)
- Commercial: No
- Registration: No
- Launched: August 13, 2007 (19 years ago)
- Current status: Offline (at least since 2013, page moved)

WikiScanner (also known as Wikipedia Scanner) was a publicly searchable database that linked anonymous edits on Wikipedia to the organizations where those edits apparently originated. It did this by cross-referencing the edits with data on the owners of the associated block of IP addresses, though it did not investigate edits made under a username. It was created by Virgil Griffith and released on August 13, 2007.

In his "WikiScanner FAQ" Griffith stated his belief that WikiScanner could help make Wikipedia more reliable for controversial topics. He also indicated that he had never been employed by the Wikimedia Foundation and claimed his work on WikiScanner was "100% noncommercial". On December 21, 2012, a research group from Fondazione Bruno Kessler released an open-source clone of WikiScanner called WikiWatchdog.

By April 2013, attempts to run "WikiScanner Classic" from wikiscanner.virgil.gr returned to the WikiScanner home page, which identified itself as "WIKIWATCHER.COM"; and invoking "WikiScanner2 Preview^{New!}" led to a "failure to load the page due to timeout" error.

In 2007, Virgil Griffith said he had to take WikiScanner down, as it was costing him "several thousand USD per month." He added below this on his WikiScanner webpage that as a grad student at Caltech in 2008 he developed with the aid of several undergraduates "a suite of Wikipedia-related tools known collectively as "WikiWatcher" which included: WikiScanner2 (Daniel), Wikiganda (Rishi), Poor Man's Checkuser, and BeaverScope," which he launched at the Hackers on Planet Earth (HOPE) conference that year. They used "high-quality data" from Quova, and among them WikiWatcher "had some media successes, but when the summer was over there was no one to maintain the tools and they fell into disrepair."

== Design ==
The tool's database contained 34 million entries on anonymous edits (those by users who were not logged in to Wikipedia) between February 7, 2002, and August 4, 2007. Griffith stated that the database was constructed by compiling the anonymous edits included amongst the monthly public database dumps of Wikipedia. He claimed to have connected the organizations to their IP address with the assistance of the IP2Location database, and through comparison had found "187,529 different organizations with at least one anonymous Wikipedia edit."

WikiScanner only worked on anonymous edits, which at the time revealed the user's IP address, not edits by anyone logged in under a username. It could not distinguish between edits made by authorized users of an organization, unauthorized intruders, or users of public-access computers that may have been using an organization's network. In discussing edits made from computers in the Vatican, computer expert Kevin Curran was quoted by the BBC as saying that it was "difficult to determine if the person was an employee or if they had maliciously hacked into the Vatican system and were 'spoofing' the IP address."

The WikiScanner FAQ noted that edits could not be positively attributed to representatives of a company, only to a computer logged into a company's network. The FAQ went on to say there is no guarantee that an edit was made by an authorized user rather than an intruder. The likelihood of such intrusions depended upon an organizations' network security; organizations such as the Vatican Library have public access terminals or networks.

== Media coverage and reaction ==
According to Wired, which first broke the story on August 13, 2007, most edits were "fairly innocuous". Wired asked users to submit "The most shameful Wikipedia spin jobs", which generated many news stories about organizations, such as the Al-Jazeera network, Fox News Channel, staffers of Democratic Senator Robert Byrd and the CIA, that had edited Wikipedia articles.

On August 21, 2007, satirist Stephen Colbert who had long featured stories about Wikipedia and its "truthiness" on his program mocked WikiScanner creator Virgil Griffith's ambivalent stance on anonymity on Wikipedia, declaring it the "right" of corporations and governments to participate in the democratic process of deciding what is and is not true on Wikipedia.

According to the BBC from August 15, 2007, WikiScanner found that some editorial contributions to Wikipedia had originated from computers operated by the Diebold company, the Democratic Congressional Campaign Committee, as well as the Vatican. The Times reported that an IP address at the BBC had made edits to Wikipedia. The BBC's Head of Interactive News, Pete Clifton published a blog on August 16 acknowledging the earlier omission, but characterized the BBC's edits of Wikipedia in this manner: "Some of the examples are pretty unedifying, but for every dodgy one there are many, many more uncontroversial edits where people at the BBC have added information or changed a detail in good faith".

The Associated Press reported on August 15, 2007, that computers owned by the Church of Scientology had been used to remove criticism from articles about Scientology on Wikipedia, including edits to the article Cult Awareness Network. The Associated Press admitted that edits to Wikipedia had been made anonymously from its own computers, though the news organization did not describe the content of the edits. In its story on WikiScanner, the New York Times too admitted that edits had been made from its own computers. Wired.com reported that the office of former Republican Senator Conrad Burns had also edited critical passages.

According to Maltastar.com from August 16, WikiScanner has shown edits by other large organizations, including Amnesty International, Apple Inc., ChevronTexaco, Coca-Cola, the British Conservative Party, Dell, EA Games, ExxonMobil, the FBI, The Guardian, Microsoft, MySpace, the National Rifle Association of America, Nestlé, News of the World, the New York Times, the Government of Portugal, the US Republican Party, Reuters, Sony, the United Nations, Walmart, and a dog breeding association. The Canadian television network CTV reported edits by other organizations including Disney and the Canadian government.

Reuters reported that CIA computers were used to edit an article regarding the 2003 United States invasion of Iraq, including editing a chart showing casualties. CIA computers also edited the article for former CIA chief William Colby. Reuters reported that an FBI computer edited an article on the United States prison at Guantanamo Bay.

On August 24, 2007, headline reports in the Australian print and electronic media were made of anonymous edits to Wikipedia by staff in the Australian Department of Prime Minister & Cabinet in order to remove potentially damaging details from articles related to the Government. Information found using WikiScanner showed 126 anonymous edits from the department to articles on sometimes controversial issues and on government ministers. The department responded by saying that Prime Minister John Howard did not direct his staff to modify the articles, and later that day the head of the department said that the changes were not made by anyone in his department or the Prime Minister's office, but by another user with the same Internet service provider. Wikiscanner also identified Australian Department of Defence (DoD) employees as having made over 5,000 edits, prompting an unprecedented announcement from the DoD to block Defence staff from editing Wikipedia in case edits were interpreted as official comment.

On August 26, 2007, The Boston Globe published an editorial about Wikipedia, described as a "democratic fountain of facts" and related WikiScanner technology, reporting as among those companies found to have edited Wikipedia were Pepsi, Wal-Mart, ExxonMobil and Royal Dutch Shell, in which specific case "In 2005, someone using a computer inside Royal Dutch Shell, the oil company, rewrote a benign description of the company, claiming it is 'run by a group of geriatrics who find it impossible to make timely decisions and have an aversion to highly-profitable ventures.'" The WikiScanner story was also covered by The Independent, which stated that many "censorial interventions" by editors with vested interests on a variety of articles in Wikipedia had been discovered.

On December 18, 2007, Fortune magazine mentioned the use of WikiScanner in the 96th of its list of the "101 Dumbest Moments in Business", saying, "A Washington Post employee is found to have changed a reference to the owner of a rival paper from Philip Anschutz to Charles Manson, while someone at The New York Times added the word 'jerk' 12 times to the entry on George W. Bush."

During the period of May 27 to June 4, 2008, edits originating from an IP address belonging to Industry Canada were made to the Jim Prentice (Federal Minister of Industry) article on Wikipedia. The edits included the removal of references to new copyright legislation and the addition of two passages about Prentice's recent accomplishments as Minister of Industry.

== Wikipedia reaction ==
Wikipedia co-founder Jimmy Wales spoke enthusiastically about WikiScanner, noting that "It brings an additional level of transparency to what's going on at Wikipedia" and that it was "fabulous and I strongly support it." The BBC quoted an unnamed Wikipedia spokesperson's praise for the tool in taking transparency "to another level" and preventing "an organisation or individuals from editing articles that they're really not supposed to." In responding to the edits from the Canadian Ministry of Industry, spokesman for the Wikimedia Foundation Jay Walsh noted that neutrality of language and guarding against conflicts of interest are two of the central pillars of Wikipedia, adding that "The edits which should be trusted would come from people who don't possess a conflict of interest, in this case, it would be worthwhile saying that if someone is making edits from a computer within the government of Canada … if it was someone within that ministry, that would theoretically constitute a conflict of interest."

Wales speculated on a possible warning to anonymous editors: "When someone clicks on 'edit,' it would be interesting if we could say, 'Hi, thank you for editing. We see you're logged in from The New York Times. Keep in mind that we know that, and it's public information' … That might make them stop and think."

== See also ==
- Reliability of Wikipedia
- Seigenthaler incident, one of several scandals involving anonymous hoaxes on Wikipedia
- WHOIS
- Wiki-Watch
