= List of Sony Music artists =

This is a list of recording artists signed to Sony Music Entertainment (and its labels distributed by the music company).

== 0-9 ==
- 12 Gauge
- 14 Bis
- 1976
- 24kGoldn
- 2CELLOS (Sony Masterworks)
- 3rd Bass
- 3rd Faze
- 4th Impact
- 50 Cent
- 6cyclemind

== A ==
- A1
- A1J (Only Taiwan)
- A-Lin
- Aaron Carter
- ABBA
- AC/DC
- Adam Harvey
- Adam Lambert
- Adam Sandler
- Addrisi Brothers
- Adele
- Addison Rae
- Adriana Evans
- Aerosmith
- Afrojack
- Agnez Mo
- The Airborne Toxic Event
- AKA (rapper)
- Akasa Singh
- Aiden Grimshaw
- Air Supply
- Alan Ko
- Alan Parsons Project
- Alan Silvestri
- Alan Walker
- Alex & Sierra
- Alexandra Burke
- Alexis Jordan
- Ali Baba
- Alice in Chains
- Alicia Keys
- Alizée
- Alif Satar
- Aliff Aziz
- The Alkaholiks
- Alkaline Trio
- Ali Kiba
- All Ends
- Allen Su
- Alpha Drive One
- Alyssa Soebandono
- Amanda Black
- Amaal Malik
- Amanda Seyfried
- Amaia Montero
- Amelia Lily
- Amon Amarth
- Amy Mastura
- Ana Carolina
- Anastacia
- And2ble
- Angy Fernandez
- Anirudh Ravichander
- Anna Vissi
- Anthony Hamilton
- Antonis Remos
- Andy Williams
- Annie Lennox
- Annihilator
- Anti-Flag
- Aram Quartet
- AR Rahman
- Ariel Rivera
- Arijit Singh
- Armaan Malik
- Arnaldo Antunes
- Art Garfunkel
- Artms
- Asia Cruise
- Astrid
- Ateez
- Audioslave
- Audy
- Automatic Loveletter
- Avicii
- Avril Lavigne
- Ava Max
- Aston Merrygold
- Aynur Doğan
- Amr Diab (Sony Music Entertainment Middle East)

== B ==
- B Praak
- Baccara
- Backstreet Boys
- Bakugan
- BTS
- Bars and Melody
- Bamboo Shoots
- Bathiya & Santhush
- Barbra Streisand
- Babyface
- Babymonster
- BBC Concert Orchestra
- BBC Symphony Orchestra
- The Beatnuts
- Beau Coup
- Beau Ryan
- Becky G
- Belinda Carlisle
- Ben&Ben
- Ben Bizzy
- Ben Goldsmith
- Beyoncé Knowles
- Big Boi
- Big L
- Big Mountain
- Big Pun
- Big Ric
- Big Time Rush
- Bic Runga
- Billy Joel
- Bia (rapper)
- Blackpink
- Blind Channel
- Blood, Sweat & Tears
- Blue Öyster Cult
- Bob Dylan
- Bobby McFerrin
- Bohemia
- Bondan Prakoso & Fade 2 Black
- Boney M.
- Bonnie Anderson
- Bow Wow
- Bowling for Soup
- Boyzone
- Boys Like Girls
- Boef
- Brad Paisley
- Brian Joo
- Brian Melo
- Brian Moon (music producer)
- Brandy
- Bressie
- Bring Me the Horizon
- Britney Spears
- Brooke Barrettsmith
- Brooke Fraser
- Brown Eyed Girls
- Brownsville Station a.k.a. Brownsville
- Bruce Springsteen
- Bruno Mars
- Buddy Guy
- Bullet For My Valentine
- Bunkface
- Burning Heads
- The Byrds

== C ==
- C+C Music Factory
- C4 Pedro
- Call It Off
- Calle Kristiansson
- Cappadonna
- Carly Rae Jepsen
- Cartel de Santa
- Carlos Vives
- Cartouche
- Cascada
- Costel Busuioc
- Collie Buddz
- Chayanne
- CD9
- Chevelle
- Caetano Veloso
- Caillou
- Cake
- Calle 13
- Calvin Harris
- Camila
- Camila Cabello
- Carcass
- Carly Simon
- Carola Häggkvist
- Carrie Underwood
- Carrossel
- Casting Crowns
- CeeLo Green
- Celine Dion
- Cella Dwellas
- Chad Kroeger
- Cher
- Charles Aznavour
- Cherrybelle
- Chicago (band)
- Chicago Symphony Orchestra
- Chico Science
- Chipmunk
- Choi Soo-young
- Chord Overstreet
- Chris Brown
- Chris Daughtry
- Chris Noah
- Chris Rene
- Chris Thomas King
- Christina Aguilera
- Ciara
- Cindy Yen
- Cinta Laura
- The Clash
- CNCO
- Coco Lee
- Coheed and Cambria
- Cokelat
- Colin Farrell
- Colonel Abrams
- The CompanY
- Conchita Wurst
- Corbin Bleu
- Cory Monteith
- Courtney Johnson
- Cosmic Girls
- Cradle of Filth
- Craig David
- Cravity
- Crayon Pop
- Cui Jian
- Custard
- C:Real
- Cyndi Lauper
- Carpark North
- Camilo
- CLMD
- Cyndi Wang

== D ==
- D Black W. Da Hat
- Daddy DJ
- Daddy Yankee
- Daft Punk
- Dami Im
- Damien Leith
- Damares
- Dan Hartman
- Daneliya Tuleshova
- Danell Lee
- Daniel Boaventura
- Daniele Silvestri
- Danny Gokey
- Danny Romero
- Darell
- Darren Criss
- Darren Hayes
- Darude
- Daryl Braithwaite
- Daughtry
- Dave Matthews Band
- Dave Wong
- David Archuleta
- David Arnold
- David Bowie
- David Campbell
- David Cassidy
- David Cook
- David Gilmour
- David Guetta
- David Hallyday
- David J
- Davido
- Davina
- Dax (rapper)
- D'banj
- Dead Prez
- Dean Martin
- Dean Ray
- Dee Deee
- Debi Nova
- Delinquent Habits
- Delta Goodrem
- Depeche Mode
- Derby Romero
- Destiny Chukunyere
- Dewiq
- Dhanush
- Dido
- Diamond White
- Diana Garnet
- Diana Ross
- Diana Yukawa
- Dianna Agron
- Dixie Chicks
- DJ Khaled
- DJ Yella
- DMX
- Do
- Dolla
- Doja Cat
- Domenic Marte
- Dominic Fike
- Dope
- Dove Cameron
- Double You
- Doug Kershaw
- Duran Duran
- Destiny's Child
- Doctor Prita
- Daisy Dares You
- Decyfer Down
- Drapht
- Dreamcatcher

== E ==
- Earl Sweatshirt
- Earth, Wind & Fire
- Eartha Kitt
- Edita Abdieski
- Édith Piaf
- Eels
- Ekkapot Wongnak
- Electric Light Orchestra
- Elena Paparizou
- Eleni Foureira
- Elizabeth Gillies
- Ella Henderson
- Ella Langley
- Elley Duhé
- Elmer Bernstein
- ELO Part II
- Elva Hsiao
- Elvis Presley
- Elyar Fox
- Eithne Ní Uallacháin
- Emblem3
- Emicida
- Emilia Mernes
- Emily Blunt
- Emily Osment
- Emiri Miyamoto
- Emma Roberts
- Ennio Morricone
- Enrique Iglesias
- Era Istrefi
- Eraserheads
- E-Rotic
- Escala
- Eugenio Bennato
- Europe
- Eurythmics
- Eva Avila
- Evan Yo
- Evanescence
- Everglow
- EXID
- Eydís Evensen

== F ==
- F4
- Faith Hill
- Fallulah
- Fatboy Slim
- Fatin Shidqia
- Faye Wong
- Felly
- Felony
- Fergie
- Fernanda Takai
- Fey
- Fia Liyana (Indonesia)
- Fifth Harmony
- Filippa Giordano
- Fireflight
- Fiona Apple
- Fiona Fung
- Fleur East
- Flow
- Franz Ferdinand
- Foo Fighters
- Foster the People
- Fozzy
- Frances Yip
- Fei Yu-ching
- Francis Magalona
- Frank Sinatra
- Frans
- Freddie Jackson
- Fresno
- Fugees
- Funkmaster Flex

== G ==
- G-Eazy
- Gamaliel, Audrey, Cantika
- Gang of Youths
- Gangsta Boo
- G.E.M
- Gene Autry
- Genesis
- Gerardo Ortiz
- George Clinton
- George Ezra
- George Gershwin
- George Michael
- Gerald Alston
- Ghostface Killah
- Gigi D'Agostino
- Giorgia
- Gita Gutawa
- Giusy Ferreri
- Glasvegas
- Glee Cast
- Gloc-9
- Gloria Estefan
- Gogol Bordello
- Good Charlotte
- Gorillaz
- Grimethorpe Colliery Band
- Gromee
- Groove Armada
- Guy Sebastian

== H ==
- Ha*Ash
- Haddaway
- Halsey
- Hannah Barrett
- Harry Styles
- H-Blockx
- Hard Kaur
- Hardy Sandhu
- Harris Jayaraj
- Heather Morris
- Henry Mancini
- H.E.R.
- Hey Monday
- Hi-5
- Hijau Daun
- Hilary Duff
- HIM
- Hironobu Kageyama
- The Hives
- Hoobastank
- Hoodoo Gurus
- Hồ Đông Quan
- Hoàng Thùy Linh
- The Hoosiers
- Hollywood Studio Symphony
- Hu Xia
- Human Nature
- Hurts

== I ==
- Idntt
- I Am Giant
- Ian Lloyd
- In Flames
- Ivi Adamou
- Imogen Heap
- I.M*
- Indiana
- Infectious Grooves
- Incubus
- Iniko
- Inspectah Deck
- INXS
- Irene Cara
- Iron Maiden
- Ironhorse
- Isaac Hayes
- Isyana Sarasvati
- Il Divo
- Il Volo
- IZ
- Izna
- IVE

== J ==
- J. Fred Knobloch
- Jackie Thomas
- The Jacksons
- Jai Waetford
- Jason Chan
- Jack Black
- Jack Ingram
- Jackie Evancho
- Jacky Wu
- Jahmene Douglas
- Jake Miller
- Jake Owen
- James Blunt
- James Brown
- James Horner
- James Ingram
- Jamie Foxx
- Jane Zhang
- Jasmine Sandlas
- Jasmine Villegas
- Jason Chan
- Jay Sean
- JC de Vera
- Jean-Michel Jarre
- Jeff Beck
- Jennifer Lopez
- Jennifer Love Hewitt
- Jeremy Renner
- Jerry Burns
- Jerry Goldsmith
- Jessica Sanchez
- Jett Rebel
- James Arthur
- JENNIE
- Jessica Simpson
- Jessica Mauboy
- Jessie J
- Jimi Jamison
- Jimi Hendrix
- Jimmy Bondoc
- JLS
- JM de Guzman
- Jonas Kaufmann
- Joanna Wang
- Joaquín Sabina
- Joe Satriani
- John Cafferty and the Beaver Brown Band
- John Denver
- John & Edward
- John Farnham
- John Legend
- John Mayer
- John Paul Young
- John Schneider
- John Williams
- Johnny Cash
- JoJo
- Jolin Tsai
- Jonas Brothers
- Jordin Sparks
- Jorge Celedon
- Josh Pyke
- Josh Shapiro
- Jota Quest
- Journey
- JPM (band)
- Juan Magan
- Judas Priest
- Julieta Venegas
- Justice Crew
- Justin Timberlake

== K ==
- KAIA
- Kai Linting
- Kalan Porter
- Kana Nishino
- Karmin
- Karnivool
- Kasabian
- Kat Deluna
- Kate Ceberano
- Katy Garbi
- Keith Whitley
- Keko
- K Koke
- Kelly Clarkson
- Kelly Key
- Ken Choi
- Kenia Os
- Kenny Chesney
- Kenny Loggins
- Kenshi Yonezu
- Kesha
- Keshia Chanté
- Kep1er
- Khwezi
- Kid Ink
- Kidz Bop
- Killarmy
- Kim Wilde
- Kimberley Chen
- Kings of Leon
- Kira Isabella
- Kizaru
- King Gnu
- KLa Project
- K.O
- Kool Savas
- Korn
- Ken Hirai
- Kreayshawn
- Kris Allen
- Kygo
- Kalafina
- Kyung

== L ==
- L.V.
- Labrinth
- La Bouche
- La The Darkman
- Lali
- Lang Lang
- La Oreja De Van Gogh
- La Quinta Estación
- L'Arc-en-Ciel
- Lala Karmela
- Latino
- Le Click
- Lea Michele
- Lea Salonga
- Lecrae
- Lee DeWyze
- Leif Garrett
- Len
- Lenka
- Leo Jaime
- Len Carlson
- Leona Lewis
- Leon Lai
- Leonard Bernstein
- Leonard Cohen
- Less Than Jake
- Leslie Grace
- Lil' Flip
- Lil Nas X
- Lin Yu Chun
- Linda Ronstadt
- Lion
- Lisa Lougheed
- LISA
- Lit
- Litfiba
- Little Trees
- Little Sea
- Lim Hyung Joo
- Lim Ji-min
- Lim Young-woong
- Limão Com Mel
- Lira
- Locnville
- Loïc Nottet
- Lodovica Comello
- London Symphony Orchestra
- Lordi
- Los Angeles Philharmonic
- Los del Río
- Louise Carver
- Loverboy
- Lovi Poe
- Lil Loaded
- LSD
- Lucy Spraggan
- Ludovico Einaudi
- Luiz Gonzaga
- Luísa Sonza
- Luke
- Luke Mejares
- Lulu Antariksa
- Lulu Santos
- Lyfe Jennings
- Loick Essien
- Little Mix
- Little Nikki

== M ==
- Marina Sena
- M.O.P.
- Mad Kap
- Mafia Honey
- Maher Zain
- Maja Salvador
- Malú
- Madeon
- Mamoru Miyano
- Mandy Moore
- Manga
- Mango
- Mary Byrne
- Marc Anthony
- Marc Mysterio
- Marco Mengoni
- Marcus & Martinus
- Maren Morris
- Maria Lawson
- Mariah Carey
- Mariana Rios
- Mark Ronson
- Mark Vincent
- Marlisa Punzalan
- Martin Garrix
- Matt Cardle
- Matt Stone
- Maurice Jarre
- Max Schneider
- Mayré Martínez
- Meat Loaf
- Meghan Trainor
- Melissa Benoist
- Melissa Manchester
- Metro Boomin
- Mew
- MGMT
- Michael Bolton
- Michael Damian
- Michael Jackson
- Michael Learns To Rock
- Michael Magee
- Michael Kiessou
- Michael Speaks
- Michelle Williams
- Midnight Oil
- Miguel
- Mike and the Mechanics
- Mika Nakashima
- Mikha Tambayong
- Mikky Ekko
- Miley Cyrus
- Milton Nascimento
- Miniature Tigers
- Mira Awad
- Miracle
- Miranda Cosgrove
- Misha B
- Mobb Deep
- Money Boy
- Monica
- Mónica Naranjo
- Monsit Khamsoi
- The Monkees
- Montaigne
- Molly Sandén
- Moonbyul
- Morteza Pashaei
- Mother's Finest
- Mountain
- Myrtle Sarrosa
- Mytha Lestari
- Modern Talking

== N ==
- N Sync
- Naia Izumi
- Nas
- Nat & Alex Wolff
- Natalia Lafourcade
- Natalie Bassingthwaite
- Natalie Imbruglia
- Natasha Bedingfield
- Natassa Theodoridou
- Nathalie Makoma
- Nathaniel Willemse
- National Philharmonic Orchestra
- Nayer
- Neha Kakkar
- Nena
- Neon Jungle
- Netsky
- Newton Faulkner
- New Kids On The Block
- Ne-yo
- Niall Horan
- Nicholas McDonald
- Nick Carter
- Nickelback
- Nicky Jam
- Nicole Scherzinger
- Nicolette Larson
- Nindy Ayunda
- Nikki Kerkhof
- Nikki Clan
- Nikki Ponte
- Nil Karaibrahimgil
- Nneka
- No Good
- Noemi
- The Northern Pikes
- The Notorious B.I.G.
- Nothing But Thieves
- The Nylons

== O ==
- Oasis
- The Offspring
- Ofra Haza
- Oh Land
- OJ
- Ol' Dirty Bastard
- Olly Murs
- Orchestral Manoeuvres in the Dark
- O'Shea
- Our Lady Peace
- Outlandish
- OutKast
- O-Zone
- Ozzy Osbourne
- Omarion
- One Direction
- Only Boys Aloud

== P ==
- P9
- Pabllo Vittar
- Padi
- Paloma Faith
- Passion Pit
- Pato Fu
- Partynextdoor
- Pathompong Sombatpiboon
- Paloma Mami
- Paula DeAnda
- Paula Tsui
- Paul McCartney
- Paul Potts
- Paul Simon
- Patrizio Buanne
- Pearl Jam
- Peking Duk
- Penny Tai
- Pet Shop Boys
- Pentatonix
- Pete Murray
- Pete Rock
- Peter Bjorn and John
- Peter Frampton
- Peter Gabriel
- Pereza
- Phenomena
- Phil Collins
- Phil Lam
- Philadelphia Orchestra
- Pierre Garnier
- Pink
- Pink Floyd
- Pitbull
- Pimmie
- Planet Hemp
- Pnau
- Pornsak Songsaeng
- Preme
- PrettyMuch
- Prodigy
- Project Pat
- Proxie
- Prilly Latuconsina
- Prince Royce
- Pumpuang Duangjan

== Q ==
- Qwote
- Q-Tip

== R ==
- R. Kelly
- The Raccoons
- Rachel Crow
- Raekwon
- Rainych
- Randy Newman
- Randy Travis
- Rage Against the Machine
- Raleigh Ritchie
- Ram Jam
- Real McCoy
- Rebecca Ferguson
- Red
- Redbone
- RedFaces
- Rednex
- Reigan Derry
- Rhydian Roberts
- Ricardo Arjona
- Rick Astley
- Rick Ross
- Rick Springfield
- Ricky Martin
- Rihanna
- Rita Ora
- Rivermaya
- Robbie Williams
- Robert Goulet
- Robert Tepper
- Robertinho do Recife
- Rosalía
- Royal Philharmonic Orchestra
- RPM
- Ruby Gloom
- Ruel
- RUFUS
- RZA

== S ==
- Saara Aalto
- Sadat X
- Sade
- Saiful
- Samantha Fox
- Samantha Jade
- Santana
- Sara Paxton
- SB19
- Scandal
- Scatman John
- Scorpions (band)
- Scouting For Girls
- The Script
- Sean Kingston
- Seohyun
- Sepultura
- Serebro
- SexBomb Girls
- The Shakin' Pyramids
- Shoti
- Stjepan Hauser
- Shakira
- Sharon Cuneta
- SHE Band
- Sheila on 7
- Silent Sanctuary
- Simon and Garfunkel
- Skank
- Skee-Lo
- Spandau Ballet
- Stereopony
- Stonebwoy
- Slim Whitman
- Stan Walker
- Steps
- Steve Barakatt
- Seven Network
- Sergey Lazarev
- The Strokes
- Sıla
- Spitalfield
- Sasha Dobson
- Shila Amzah
- Skrillex
- Slayer
- Slot Machine (band)
- Smash Mouth
- Snoh Aalegra
- Snoop Dogg
- Son Dam Bi
- Sonny Moore
- Sonohra
- Sons of Apollo
- Soraya Arnelas
- STAYC
- Stan Bush
- Starship
- Steve Aoki
- Steve Perry
- Steve Winwood
- Steven Curtis Chapman
- Steven Van Zandt
- Stevie Wonder
- Sueden
- Sugababes
- Suicidal Tendencies
- Sum 41
- Sunaree Ratchasima
- Supercell
- Superman Is Dead
- Survivor
- Susan Anton
- Susan Boyle
- Su Yunying
- Svetlana Loboda
- Sweet Sable
- Switchfoot
- System of a Down
- Sorten Muld
- SZA

== T ==
- T1419
- T-Pain
- T-Square
- Taco
- Tame Impala
- Tamera Foster
- Tash
- Tata Young
- Taylor Henderson
- Tasya Kamila
- Tatjana Saphira
- Tedua
- Teen Angels
- Tekno Miles
- Tenacious D
- Terryana Fatiah
- Thalía
- tha Supreme
- The Backyardigans
- The Black Eyed Peas
- The Clash
- The Presidents of the United States of America
- The Remix Master
- The Rose
- The Sam Willows
- The Script
- Theo Tams
- The Changcuters
- The Eraserheads
- The Stunners
- The Gazette
- The Sun
- The Ting Tings
- The Urge
- The Veronicas
- The Vines
- Three Days Grace
- Three 6 Mafia
- Thái Lê Minh Hiếu (singer)
- T. Mills
- Tim Hwang
- Tim Feehan
- Tim McGraw
- Tim Omaji
- Timbo King
- Tina Moore
- Tina Turner
- Tish
- Tiwa Savage
- Tommy Puett
- Tommy Tutone
- Toni Braxton
- Tonight Alive
- Tony Bennett
- Tori Amos
- Toto
- Tove Styrke
- Train
- Trainwreck
- Travis Scott
- Trey Parker
- A Tribe Called Quest
- TripleS
- Tupac Shakur
- Tung Twista
- Turma do Balão Mágico
- Tyler, The Creator
- Tyler Ward
- Tyler Shaw
- Tyla

== U ==
- Usher
- Union J
- Udit Narayan

== V ==
- Arcadi Volodos
- Vagetoz
- Vampire Weekend
- Vamps
- Vanessa Liyana (Indonesia)
- Vayne (New Zealand)
- Vangelis
- Vania Larissa
- Vanness Wu
- Vazquez Sounds
- Víctor Manuelle
- Vieng Narumon
- Virginia Maestro
- VL Mike
- Velvet Revolver
- Victoria Justice
- Violetta Zironi

== W ==
- Wanessa
- Walk Off the Earth
- Walk the Moon
- Wang Chung
- Wang Leehom
- "Weird Al" Yankovic
- Westlife
- Wham!
- Whitney Houston
- Will Smith
- will.i.am
- William Ackerman
- William Warfield
- Willow Smith
- Wings
- Within Temptation
- Will Young
- Wizkid
- Wiz Khalifa
- Wu-Tang Clan

== X ==
- The X-Ecutioners
- XO-IX
- Xikers
- Xuxa
- Xzibit

== Y ==
- Yashin
- Yellow Magic Orchestra
- Yiruma
- Yovie & Nuno
- Yui
- Yuri (US/UK/Australia/Malaysia)
- Yuridia
- Yo Gotti
- Yuvan Shankar Raja
- Young Pharoz
- Yvette Michele

== Z ==
- Zerobaseone
- Zoboomafoo
- Zarema
- Zendaya
- Zara Larsson
- Zayn
- Zé Ramalho
- Zezé Di Camargo & Luciano

== See also ==
- List of Sony BMG Music Entertainment artists for music artists engaged with Sony BMG
