= List of Columbia Records artists =

A partial listing of recording artists who currently or formerly recorded for Columbia Records (known in most of the world as CBS Records prior to 1991) include the following list.

== 0–9 ==
- 24kGoldn
- 3LW (So So Def/Columbia)
- 3rd Bass (Def Jam/Columbia)
- 3rd Faze
- 3Quency
- 50 Cent

== A ==
- Gregory Abbott
- AC/DC
- Ace Hood
- Acceptance
- Yolanda Adams
- Addrisi Brothers
- Adele (USA/Canada/Latin America from 2008 to 2021 under XL/Columbia, worldwide since 2021 under Melted Stone/Columbia)
- Addison Rae
- Aerosmith
- The Afghan Whigs
- The Afters
- Todd Agnew
- Alabama 3
- Alex & Sierra
- Jessi Alexander (Columbia Nashville)
- Ora Alexander
- Gali Atari (Sony Music)
- Lucky Ali
- Alice in Chains
- Tha Alkaholiks (Loud/Columbia)
- María Conchita Alonso
- Alvin and the Chipmunks
- Amerie (Rise/Columbia)
- Amil (Roc-A-Fella/Columbia)
- Trey Anastasio
- Anberlin
- Angélique Kidjo
- Anggun
- Eric Andersen
- Jon Anderson
- Keith Anderson (Columbia Nashville)
- Lynn Anderson
- The Andrews Sisters
- Anjani
- Paul Anka
- Marc Anthony
- Anthrax
- Apoptygma Berzerk
- Fiona Apple (Work/Columbia)
- The Apex Theory
- Aqualung
- Tina Arena
- Arcade Fire
- Arizona Zervas
- Artms (Modhaus/Columbia; Korean Released Only)
- Toni Arden
- Louis Armstrong
- Artful Dodger
- James Arthur
- The Association
- Astrid Sartiasari (Sony/Epic/Columbia Malaysia)
- Aşkın Nur Yengi
- ATEEZ (Japan)
- Chet Atkins
- Nicole Atkins
- The Ataris
- Atlanta Rhythm Section
- Gene Autry
- The Avant-Garde
- Axis of Justice
- Au/Ra (Loudmouth/Columbia)
- The Automatic Automatic
- Aster Aweke
- Roy Ayers
- Ayo & Teo
- Azteca

== B ==
- B.T. Express
- Burt Bacharach
- Tal Bachman
- The Bad Plus
- Bad Religion
- Mildred Bailey
- Philip Bailey
- Moe Bandy (Columbia Nashville)
- The Bangles
- R.C. Bannon (Columbia Nashville)
- Bobby Bare (Columbia Nashville)
- Barefoot Bill From Alabama
- Keith Barrow
- John Barry (CBS)
- Karl Bartos
- Count Basie
- Batteaux
- BBB (Columbia Jakarta)
- Beady Eye (outside US)
- Beastie Boys (Def Jam/Columbia)
- Bix Beiderbecke
- Bedük
- Bel Canto
- Drake Bell (Nickelodeon/Columbia)
- Marcella Bella
- Regina Belle
- Tony Bennett (RPM/Columbia)
- George Benson
- Cheryl Bentyne (member of Manhattan Transfer)
- Polly Bergen
- Herschel Bernardi
- Leonard Bernstein (Columbia Masterworks)
- Beyoncé (Parkwood Entertainment/Columbia)
- Big Audio Dynamite
- Big Brother and the Holding Company
- Big L
- Big Time Rush (Nickelodeon/Columbia)
- E. Power Biggs (Columbia Masterworks)
- Bilmuri
- Tony Bird
- Bizarre Inc (Vinyl Solution/Columbia)
- Blá Blá Blá
- Black Kids
- Blackhawk (Columbia Nashville)
- Art Blakey
- Blaque (Track Masters/Columbia)
- Blink-182
- Blood, Sweat & Tears
- Bloodhound Gang
- Mike Bloomfield
- Blue Öyster Cult
- Arthur Blythe
- The Bob's Burgers Album
- Bobby & The Midnites
- Willie Bobo
- Tommy Bolin
- Claude Bolling (Columbia Masterworks)
- Michael Bolton
- Richard Bona
- Karla Bonoff
- The Boomtown Rats (US)
- Larry Boone (Columbia Nashville)
- Boss (DJ West/Chaos/Columbia)
- Chris Botti
- Pierre Boulez
- Bow Wow
- Wade Bowen (Sea Gayle/Columbia Nashville)
- David Bowie (ISO Records, licensed to Columbia)
- Fiddlin' Charlie Bowman
- Jimmy Boyd
- Liona Boyd (Columbia Masterworks)
- Susan Boyle (Syco Music/Columbia) (US)
- Brakence
- Bravehearts
- Breathe Carolina
- Teresa Brewer
- Bring Me the Horizon
- Britny Fox
- Broken Bells
- David Bromberg
- The Brothers Four
- Dave Brubeck
- Luke Bryan
- Anita Bryant
- Ray Bryant
- Lindsey Buckingham
- The Buckinghams
- Jeff Buckley
- Buckner & Garcia
- Buckshot LeFonque
- Budapest String Quartet
- Bullet for My Valentine
- Vernon Burch
- Hannibal Buress (Comedy Central/Columbia)
- Carol Burnett
- T-Bone Burnett
- Billy Burnette
- Kate Bush (US)
- Ferruccio Busoni
- Busta Rhymes
- Carl Butler
- Champ Butler
- Pearl Butler
- Billy Butterfield
- Charlie Byrd
- The Byrds
- Peabo Bryson

== C ==
- C+C Music Factory
- Cha Cha
- Francis Cabrel
- Cage Kennylz
- Susan Cagle
- Caitlin & Will (Columbia Nashville)
- Cake
- Calamity Jane (Columbia Nashville)
- Cab Calloway
- Court Yard Hounds
- Dove Cameron
- Paula Campbell
- Stacy Dean Campbell (Columbia Nashville)
- Cannons
- Eddie Cantor
- Jerry Cantrell
- Mariah Carey
- Carcass
- Matt Cardle
- Brandi Carlile
- Roberto Carlos
- Wendy Carlos (Columbia Masterworks)
- Mary Chapin Carpenter (Columbia Nashville)
- Vikki Carr
- Raffaella Carrà
- Carrie Underwood
- Jenny Lou Carson
- Mindy Carson
- Carter Family (Original group, 2nd and 3rd generations)
- The Carter Sisters also called "Carter Sisters & Mother Maybelle"
- Anita Carter
- Helen Carter (Okeh)
- James Carter
- June Carter
- Maybelle Carter
- Valerie Carter (transferred to ARC/Columbia for Wild Child)
- Pablo Casals
- Johnny Cash (Columbia Nashville)
- June Carter Cash (Columbia Nashville)
- Ray Cash
- Rosanne Cash (Columbia Nashville)
- Cathedral
- Miles Caton
- Cecilio & Kapono
- John Cena
- Central Cee
- Chad & Jeremy
- The Chainsmokers
- Chairlift
- Chalk FarM
- The Chambers Brothers
- Champaign
- Carol Channing
- Ray Charles
- Charlie (Fantasy Girls album, USA)
- Chayanne
- Cher
- Cherub
- Kenny Chesney (Blue Chair/Columbia Nashville)
- Mark Chesnutt (Columbia Nashville)
- Chevelle
- The Chieftains (outside of Ireland)
- Chicago
- The Chipettes
- Chipmunk
- Chloe Bailey (Parkwood Entertainment/Columbia)
- Chloe x Halle (Parkwood Entertainment/Columbia)
- Jay Chou (Sony/Epic/Columbia Malaysia)
- Christie (CBS)
- Lou Christie
- Susan Christie
- Charlotte Church
- Christine McVie
- The Chuck Wagon Gang
- Circus of Power
- Clams Casino
- The Clancy Brothers and Tommy Makem
- Buddy Clark
- Petula Clark (UK, France and Canada)
- Anne Clark
- The Clash
- David Clayton-Thomas
- Buzz Clifford
- Rosemary Clooney
- Clutch
- The Coasters
- Bruce Cockburn
- David Allan Coe (Columbia Nashville)
- Amber Coffman
- Coheed and Cambria
- Adam Cohen
- Leonard Cohen
- Coin
- Ornette Coleman
- Collie Buddz
- Colosseum
- Arthur Collins
- Columbia Symphony Orchestra
- Chi Coltrane
- Shawn Colvin
- Luke Combs (River House/Columbia Nashville)
- Les Compagnons de la chanson (CBS Disques S.A.)
- Compost
- Jeff Conaway
- John Conlee (Columbia Nashville)
- Harry Connick Jr.
- Ray Conniff
- Consequence
- Aaron Copland
- The Coral
- Chick Corea
- Jill Corey
- Miranda Cosgrove (Nickelodeon/Columbia)
- Elvis Costello (US)
- Court Yard Hounds
- Billy "Crash" Craddock
- Robert Craft (Columbia Masterworks)
- Creed
- Rachel Crow
- Rodney Crowell (Columbia Nashville)
- The Cryan' Shames
- Cry of Love
- Crazy Town
- Cravity (Starship/Columbia; Korean releases only)
- Darren Criss
- CRX
- Xavier Cugat
- Cypress Hill (Ruffhouse/Columbia)
- The Cyrkle
- Miley Cyrus
- Noah Cyrus

== D ==
- D Generation
- Da Brat (So So Def/Columbia)
- Daft Punk (Daft Life/Columbia)
- Lacy J. Dalton (Columbia Nashville)
- Vic Damone
- Dangerous Toys
- Danzig
- The Daou
- Terence Trent D'Arby
- Bobby Darin
- Joe Dassin (CBS Disques S.A. and Columbia of Canada)
- Dave (CBS Disques S.A.)
- Dave Gahan (member of Depeche Mode)
- John Davidson
- Jimmie Davis
- Mac Davis
- Miles Davis
- Tyrone Davis
- Doris Day
- Stu Daye (Pilot/Columbia)
- Jimmy Dean (Columbia Nashville)
- Death
- Death Grips
- Cole Deggs & the Lonesome (Columbia Nashville)
- Paco de Lucía
- Declan McKenna
- Dej Loaf
- Delaney & Bonnie
- Depeche Mode (Mute/Columbia)
- The Derek Trucks Band
- Destiny's Child (Music World/Columbia)
- Frank De Vol
- Barry De Vorzon
- Dillon Francis
- Al Di Meola
- Neil Diamond
- Dion
- Celine Dion
- Il Divo
- Die Ärzte (1984–1988)
- Dixie Chicks (Wide Open/Columbia Nashville)
- DJ Kayslay
- DJ Nabs
- Dr. Dre (former)
- Dr. Feelgood (USA/Canada)
- Dr. Hook & the Medicine Show
- Deryl Dodd
- Tim Dog (Ruffhouse/Columbia)
- Ned Doheny
- Dokken
- Domo Genesis (Odd Future/Columbia)
- The Dorsey Brothers
- Downtown Science (Def Jam/Columbia)
- Sue Draheim
- Drowning Pool
- Duo Tal & Groethuysen
- Jermaine Dupri (So So Def/Columbia)
- Bob Dylan
- Jakob Dylan
- Ronnie Dyson

== E ==
- Earl Sweatshirt (Tan Cressida)
- Earth, Wind & Fire (ARC/Columbia)
- Walter Egan
- The Electric Flag
- Elaine
- Electric Light Orchestra
- Elkland
- Duke Ellington
- Don Ellis
- Emilio Navaira (Columbia Nashville)
- The Emotions
- Empire cast
- EPMD (Def Jam/RAL/Columbia)
- E.S.T.
- David Essex
- Ethan Bortnick
- Evan and Jaron
- Jackie Evancho (Syco Music/Columbia)
- Evanescence
- Bill Evans
- Tiffany Evans
- George Ezra
- Fleur East
- Perrie Edwards

== F ==
- Barbara Fairchild (Columbia Nashville)
- Shelly Fairchild (Columbia Nashville)
- Percy Faith
- Rose Falcon
- Fania All-Stars
- Tyler Farr (Columbia Nashville)
- Eileen Farrell (Columbia Masterworks)
- Dionne Farris
- Fastway
- Rebecca Ferguson (Syco Music/Columbia)
- Nino Ferrer (CBS Disques S.A.)
- Femtanyl
- Fertig, Los!
- Dominic Fike
- Fingertight
- Firehose
- The Firesign Theatre
- First Aid Kit
- Ella Fitzgerald
- Five for Fighting
- Five Finger Death Punch (Prospect Park)
- Béla Fleck (Columbia Nashville)
- Fleetwood Mac (Blue Horizon/CBS) (outside US/Canada)
- The Flying Burrito Brothers
- Dan Fogelberg
- Foggy Mountain Boys
- Ronnie Foster
- Foster the People
- The Four Lads
- Zino Francescatti
- Frankie J
- Aretha Franklin
- Franz Ferdinand
- Fraser & DeBolt
- Frenship
- Janie Fricke (Columbia Nashville)
- David Frizzell (Columbia Nashville)
- The Front
- Michel Fugain (CBS Disques S.A. France)
- Fugees (Ruffhouse/Columbia)
- Full Force
- Future
- FBG Duck

== G ==
- G.E.M. (Hummingbird/Sony/Epic/Columbia; Malaysian released only)
- Jean Gabin (CBS Disques S.A.)
- Janita Gabriella (Sony/Columbia Malaysia)
- André Gagnon (Columbia of Canada)
- Eric Gale
- Patsy Gallant (Columbia of Canada)
- Katy Garbi
- Charly García
- Sean Garrett (Roc Nation/Columbia)
- Art Garfunkel
- Judy Garland
- Bradley Gaskin (Columbia Nashville)
- Larry Gatlin (Columbia Nashville, first six albums leased from Monument)
- Marvin Gaye
- Crystal Gayle (Columbia Nashville)
- Stan Getz
- J Geils Band
- Teddy Geiger
- Byron Curry (Columbia Masterworks)
- Gentle Giant (US and Canada, leased from Vertigo and Chrysalis)
- Gesaffelstein
- Gigi (Sony/Columbia Malaysia)
- Art Gillham (The Whispering Pianist) (first electrical recording 1925)
- Elizabeth Gillies (Nickelodeon/Columbia)
- Terry Gilkyson
- David Gilmour
- Glasvegas
- Glee cast
- Glokk40Spaz
- Glowie
- The Go! Team
- Goapele (Skyblaze/Columbia)
- Arthur Godfrey
- Gogol Bordello
- Golden Earring
- Goldfinger
- Benny Golson
- GoodBooks
- Benny Goodman
- Delta Goodrem
- Dexter Gordon
- Eydie Gormé
- Vern Gosdin (Columbia Nashville)
- Gossip
- Glenn Gould (Columbia Masterworks)
- Robert Goulet
- Geolier
- Gowan (Anthem/Columbia)
- Alana Grace
- Jamie Grace
- Stéphane Grappelli
- Diva Gray
- Gregory Gray
- Mark Gray (Columbia Nashville)
- Great Plains (Columbia Nashville)
- Partridge Green
- Vivian Green
- Gene Greene
- Ken Griffin
- Gumball
- A Guy Called Gerald
- Grimes
- Grace Vanderwaal

== H ==
- Bruce Haack
- Haim
- Nina Hagen
- Adelaide Hall
- John Hall (Power released through ARC/Columbia)
- Halle Bailey (Parkwood Entertainment/Columbia)
- Halsey
- Paul Hampton
- Herbie Hancock
- Hanoi Rocks
- The Harden Trio
- Arlene Harden
- Tim Hardin
- The Harmonicats
- Jimmy Harnen
- Calvin Harris
- Corey Hart (Columbia of Canada)
- Sophie B. Hawkins
- Darren Hayes
- Isaac Hayes
- Wade Hayes (Columbia Nashville)
- Roy Haynes
- Harlem World (So So Def/Columbia)
- Hawks
- Heart
- Heath Brothers
- Heaven's Edge
- Mitch Hedberg (Comedy Central/Columbia)
- Coleman Hell
- Hellyeah
- Ella Henderson (Syco Music/Columbia) (US)
- Fletcher Henderson
- Woody Herman
- Patrick Hernandez
- Ari Hest
- Hey Monday (Decaydance/Columbia)
- The Highwaymen (Columbia Nashville)
- Dan Hill
- Lauryn Hill
- Z.Z. Hill
- The Hi-Lo's
- Mattie Hite
- Hodgy
- Billie Holiday
- Jake Holmes
- The Hooters
- Linda Hopkins
- Dan Hornsby
- Vladimir Horowitz (Columbia Masterworks)
- Johnny Horton
- Cissy Houston
- Marques Houston
- Terrence Howard
- How to Destroy Angels
- Home Free
- Hozier (US/Canada/Australia)
- Freddie Hubbard
- Owen Hudson
- Hundred Reasons

== I ==
- Julio Iglesias
- Jack Ingram (Columbia Nashville)
- INGRID (Parkwood Entertainment/Columbia)
- Iniko
- Inner City
- Idntt (Modhaus/Columbia; Korean released only)
- Insane Clown Posse (Psychopathic Records; distribution only)
- Irakere
- Iron Maiden (US)
- It's a Beautiful Day
- Ive (Starship/Columbia; Korean releases only)
- The Internet (Odd Future/Columbia)
- IZ (Music K; 2017-2021/Sony Music/Columbia; Korean/Malaysian releases only)
- Ian (Known for making "Magic Johnson" and Figure it out")

== J ==
- J. Cole (Roc Nation/Columbia)
- Je'Von Evans (Heavy Muscle/Columbia
- The Jacksons
- Mahalia Jackson
- Michael Jackson
- Rebbie Jackson
- Stonewall Jackson
- Kim Jae-hwan (WakeOne/Columbia; Korean released only)
- Jaroslav Jakubovič
- Jagged Edge (So So Def/Columbia)
- Bob James (Columbia/Tappan Zee; material was later reissued by Warner Bros. Records)
- Casey James (19/Columbia Nashville)
- Harry James
- Sonny James (Columbia Nashville)
- Tom Jans
- Lauren Jauregui
- Jay Z (Def Jam - until 2009)
- Wyclef Jean
- Jennie (Odd Atelier/Columbia)
- Lyfe Jennings
- Buddy Jewell (Columbia Nashville)
- Im Jihoo (Sony Music Korea/Epic/Columbia Records)
- Lim Ji-min (Play M Entertainment/Columbia/RCA Records; Korean releases only)
- J-Kwon
- Joan Jett and the Blackhearts (Blackheart Records)
- Kari Jobe (Integrity/Columbia)
- The Joe Perry Project
- Billy Joel
- J.J. Johnson
- Robert Johnson
- Jennifer Mamani (CBS/Columbia)
- Jim Jones
- Oran "Juice" Jones (Def Jam/Columbia)
- Janis Joplin
- Alexis Jordan
- Josie and the Pussycats
- Journey
- Judas Priest
- Juicy J
- Juilliard String Quartet
- Pauline Julien
- Junkie XL
- Juno Reactor
- Victoria Justice (Nickelodeon/Columbia)
- Jussie Smollett

== K ==
- Patricia Kaas
- Brenda Kahn
- Roger Wolfe Kahn
- Ini Kamoze
- Christian Kane (Columbia Nashville)
- Madleen Kane
- Miles Kane
- Kasabian
- Katy B (Rinse FM/Columbia)
- Kaycee Grogan
- Sammy Kaye
- Jorma Kaukonen
- Mat Kearney
- Kenna
- Kep1er (WakeOne/Klap/Columbia; Korean released only)
- Raymond Louis Kennedy (ARC/Columbia)
- Alicia Keys
- Kreayshawn
- Kid Capri (Track Masters/Columbia)
- Angélique Kidjo
- Killer Mike (Aquemini/Columbia)
- Killing Joke
- Killradio
- Killswitch Engage
- Carl King
- Peggy King
- King Princess
- Kings of Leon
- The Kinks
- John Kirby
- Gladys Knight
- Gladys Knight & the Pips
- Holly Knight (self-titled album)
- Reggie Knighton (transferred to ARC/Columbia for The Reggie Knighton Band)
- Koe Wetzel
- Kool Keith (Ruffhouse/Columbia)
- Al Kooper
- Korn (until 2009)
- Andre Kostelanetz
- Kelly Severn (Severn/Columbia/RCA)
- Kraftwerk
- Chantal Kreviazuk
- Kris Kross (Ruffhouse/Columbia)
- Toshinobu Kubota
- Kula Shaker
- Kiana Eldrid
- Leah Kunkel
- Kurious (Hoppoh/Columbia)
- Kay Kyser
- Krewella
- Alan Kuo (Sony/Epic/Columbia Malaysia)

== L ==
- Lisa (Sony/LLOUD/Columbia/RCA Records)
- Lars Huang (Columbia/Sony Music China)
- Labrinth (US)
- Frankie Laine
- Lake
- Kendrick Lamar
- Lamb of God
- Lambert, Hendricks & Ross
- Miranda Lambert (Columbia Nashville)
- George Lamond
- Catherine Lara
- The Lashes
- The Laughing Dogs
- Cinta Laura (Sony/Columbia/RCA Malaysia)
- Steve Lawrence
- Hubert Laws
- LCD Soundsystem
- Denis Leary (Comedy Central/Columbia)
- Lecrae
- Michele Lee
- Mylon LeFevre (Columbia and CBS Associated)
- Leftfield (Hard Hands/Columbia)
- John Legend
- Len
- Gérard Lenorman
- LÉON
- Lewis Del Mar
- LunchMoney Lewis (Kemosabe/Columbia)
- Ted Lewis
- Lexi Jayde
- Monique Leyrac
- Prudence Liew
- Lil' Fizz
- Lil' Flip (Loud/Columbia)
- Lil Nas X
- Lil' Peep
- Lil Scoom89 (Signal/Columbia)
- Lil Tjay
- Lil' Xan
- Mark Lindsay
- Lisa Lisa and Cult Jam
- LL Cool J (Def Jam/Columbia)
- Lo Fidelity Allstars (Skint/Columbia)
- Kenny Loggins
- Loggins and Messina
- Little Mix (US)
- Guy Lombardo
- London String Quartet (Columbia Masterworks)
- Lone Star
- Brice Long (Columbia Nashville)
- Bobby Lord (Columbia Nashville)
- Lord Tariq and Peter Gunz
- Lostprophets
- Lous and the Yakuza
- Lovedrug
- The Love Affair (outside US)
- Love/Hate
- Loverboy
- Nick Lowe (US)
- LSD
- Norman Luboff
- LeToya Luckett
- Jimmie Lunceford
- Cheryl Lynn

== M ==
- MN8
- M.I.A.
- Macklemore
- Macklemore and Ryan Lewis
- Magic Man
- Magnetic Man
- Mad Cobra
- Madeon
- Taj Mahal
- Mahavishnu Orchestra
- Mahogany Rush
- Natalie Maines (Columbia Nashville)
- Malcolm Todd
- Manic Street Preachers
- Barbara Mandrell (Columbia Nashville)
- Chuck Mangione
- The Manhattan Transfer (1991–92)
- The Manhattans
- Barry Manilow
- Frank Marino
- Marmalade
- Branford Marsalis
- Ellis Marsalis Jr.
- Wynton Marsalis
- Marshanda (Sony/Epic/Columbia Malaysia)
- Marshmello
- Martika
- Ricky Martin (C2/Columbia)
- Martina McBride
- Mary Mary
- Ma$e (So So Def/Columbia)
- Mashmakhan
- Jackie Mason
- Nick Mason (outside Europe)
- Johnny Mathis
- Iain Matthews (1976–77)
- Matthews, Wright & King (Columbia Nashville)
- Maxon Margiela
- Maxwell
- John Mayer (Aware/Columbia)
- Rachael MacFarlane
- Seth MacFarlane
- Paul McCartney (US/Canada, after 1979)
- Jennette McCurdy (Nickelodeon/Columbia)
- Roger McGuinn
- Joey McIntyre (C2/Columbia)
- Nellie McKay
- Scott McKenzie
- John McLaughlin
- Marshall McLuhan
- Katharine McPhee
- Peter McPoland
- Carmen McRae
- MC Serch (Def Jam/Chaos/Columbia)
- Mecano
- Mark Medlock
- Meek Mill
- John Mellencamp
- Memento
- Men at Work
- Maria Mena
- Tim Mensy (Columbia Nashville)
- Harold Melvin & the Blue Notes (Philadelphia International/Columbia)
- Freddie Mercury
- Metallica (until 1991)
- MFSB (Philadelphia International/Columbia)
- MGMT
- George Michael (US/Canada)
- Lea Michele
- MICO
- Midi Rain (Vinyl Solution/Columbia)
- Bette Midler
- Midtown
- Mile
- Miley Cyrus (until 2026)
- Mitch Miller
- T. Mills
- Nathan Milstein (Columbia Masterworks)
- Charles Mingus
- Liza Minnelli
- Misfits
- Guy Mitchell
- Dimitri Mitropoulos
- MKTO
- Ms Mr
- Mr. T
- Mobb Deep (Loud/Columbia)
- Moby
- Moby Grape
- Don Moen (Integrity/Columbia)
- Katy Moffatt
- Eddie Money (Wolfgang/Columbia)
- Thelonious Monk
- Ashley Monroe (Columbia Nashville)
- Montgomery Gentry (Columbia Nashville)
- Sara Montiel
- Jackie Moore
- M.O.P.
- Megan Moroney (Columbia Nashville)
- Moonbyul (Sony/Columbia/RCA Records)
- Moxie Raia
- Alanis Morissette (Columbia SevenOne) (Europe)
- Mormon Tabernacle Choir
- Maren Morris (Columbia Nashville)
- Motion City Soundtrack
- Mudhoney
- Mudvayne
- Shawn Mullins
- Eddie Murphy
- Elliott Murphy
- Olly Murs
- Yeum Myongwoo (Sony Music/Columbia/Epic Records, Korean releases only)

== N ==
- Jim Nabors
- The Naked Brothers Band (Nickelodeon/Columbia)
- Natalie Maines
- Anna Nalick
- Nas
- Milton Nascimento
- Nature
- Naya Rivera (dropped)
- The Neighbourhood
- Willie Nelson (Columbia Nashville)
- Nena (CBS Schallplatten)
- N.E.R.D.
- Peter Nero
- The New Christy Minstrels
- New Kids on the Block
- Randy Newman
- Nice & Smooth (RAL/Columbia)
- Willie Nile
- Nine Inch Nails (Null Corp./Columbia) (US/Taiwan)
- NKOTBSB
- No Wyld
- Noemi
- Northern State

== O ==
- OG Maco
- Oxlade
- The O'Jays (Philadelphia International/Columbia)
- The O'Kanes (Columbia Nashville)
- The Oak Ridge Boys (Columbia Nashville)
- Oasis (Big Brother/Helter Skelter/Columbia) (US)
- Frank Ocean
- Odd Future
- The Offspring (1997–2013)
- Babatunde Olatunji
- Old Crow Medicine Show (Columbia Nashville)
- Old Dominion (Columbia Nashville)
- Ollabelle
- Joe "King" Oliver
- One Direction (Columbia) (US)
- OneRepublic*
- Onyx (JMJ/RAL/Chaos/Columbia)
- Oomph!
- Original Concept (Def Jam/Columbia)
- Eugene Ormandy (Columbia Masterworks)
- Our Lady Peace
- The Outfield
- OutKast
- Ozzy Osbourne

== P ==
- P1Harmony (FNC Entertainment/Columbia) (US)
- Papa Roach
- Passion Pit
- Patti Page
- Polo G
- Michel Pagliaro
- Johan Palm
- Dolly Parton (Columbia Nashville)
- Billy Paul (Philadelphia International/Columbia)
- Les Paul and Mary Ford
- Pavlov's Dog (debut album leased from ABC Records)
- Lil Peep
- Peace
- Peach Pit
- Pearl Jam
- Gayla Peevey
- Christine Perfect (Blue Horizon/CBS) (outside US/Canada)
- Katy Perry
- Steve Perry
- Julian Perretta
- Persephone's Bees
- Joe Pesci
- Perto
- Philadelphia Orchestra (Columbia Masterworks)
- Washington Phillips
- Edith Piaf
- Kellie Pickler (19/Columbia Nashville)
- Pink Floyd (outside Europe from 1975-1999 and since 2016, and worldwide since 2024)
- Joe Piscopo
- Mary Kay Place
- Manitas de Plata
- Rachel Platten
- Play
- P.O.D.
- Pamela Polland
- Jean-Luc Ponty
- Powerman 5000
- Prairie Madness
- Pras (Ruffhouse/Columbia)
- Andy Pratt
- The Presidents of the United States of America
- Pretty Maids
- PrettyMuch
- Ray Price (Columbia Nashville)
- Primal Scream
- Prince (NPG/Columbia)
- Charles A. Prince
- Project Pat (Hypnotize Minds/Columbia)
- The Psycho Realm (Ruffhouse/Columbia)
- Public Enemy (Def Jam/Columbia)
- Gary Puckett & The Union Gap
- The Puppies (Chaos/Columbia)
- ppcocaine
- Perrie
- powfu

== Q ==
- Carmel Quinn
- Quarashi
- Bill Quateman
- Queen (back catalogue since 2026)

== R ==
- Joshua Radin
- Radiopilot
- Raekwon (Loud/Columbia)
- Rag 'N' Bone Man
- A. R. Rahman
- Addison Rae
- Ramones
- Jean-Pierre Rampal (Columbia Masterworks)
- Bella Ramsey
- Rancid
- The Rascals
- Ratu (Sony Music/Columbia Malaysia)
- Raury (LoveRenaissance/Columbia)
- Genya Ravan
- The Raveonettes
- Raleigh Ritchie
- Lou Rawls (Philadelphia International/Columbia)
- Johnnie Ray
- Raze
- Tony Rebel (Chaos/Columbia)
- Red Rockers (415/Columbia)
- Mike Reid (Columbia Nashville)
- The Remix Master
- Renato e Seus Blue Caps
- Regina Murphy (until 2021)
- Return to Forever
- Paul Revere & the Raiders
- Nóirín Ní Riain
- Kyle Riabko
- Chase Rice (Dack Janiels/Columbia Nashville)
- Rich Kidz
- Ricochet (Columbia Nashville)
- Rip Chords
- Rise Against
- Roachford
- Marty Robbins (Columbia Nashville)
- Emma Roberts (Nickelodeon/Columbia)
- Robinella and the CC String Band
- Eileen Rodgers
- David Rogers (Columbia Nashville)
- The Rolling Stones (Rolling Stones/Columbia)
- Romeo Void (415/Columbia)
- Mark Ronson
- Robi Dräco Rosa
- Rosalía
- Charles Rosen
- Lucy Rose
- Tim Rose
- Rick Ross
- Reginaldo Rossi
- Billy Joe Royal
- John Wesley Ryles (Columbia Nashville)
- Russ
- Ruth B
- Rosa Linn
- Rita Ora (Signed To Roc Nation Prior To Her Move To Atlantic UK, Distributed By Columbia Records)
- Ruth B.

== S ==
- Slayyyter
- Sum 41 (Canada)
- Stromae
- Steve Angello
- Slayr
- Raphael Saadiq
- Bally Sagoo
- David Sanchez
- Roger Sanchez
- Felicia Sanders
- Arturo Sandoval
- Sandeé (Fever/RAL/Columbia)
- Santana
- Savage Garden (outside Australia/Japan)
- Save Ferris (Withyn/Columbia)
- Alexandra Savior
- Scandal
- Kristen Schaal (Comedy Central/Columbia)
- Janne Schaffer
- Patti Scialfa
- Raymond Scott
- Tom Scott
- Pete Seeger
- The Seekers
- Seiko
- Seohyun (LEAD Entertainment/Epic/Columbia, Korean releases only)
- Serart
- Rudolf Serkin
- Serayah
- Shaggy
- Shakti
- Ravi Shankar
- Billy Joe Shaver (Columbia Nashville)
- Marlena Shaw
- Woody Shaw
- Dorothy Shay
- Shenandoah (Columbia Nashville)
- She & Him
- Ricky Van Shelton (Columbia Nashville)
- T.G. Sheppard (Columbia Nashville)
- The Shins (Aural Apothecary/Columbia)
- Dinah Shore
- Wayne Shorter
- Bobby Sichran
- The Silencers
- Silver Condor
- Lu Ann Simms
- Simple Plan
- Simone
- Simon & Garfunkel
- Paul Simon
- Carly Simon
- Jessica Simpson (Columbia/Columbia Nashville)
- Frank Sinatra
- Sixpence None the Richer
- Red Skelton
- Slayer
- Sleeping with Sirens
- Bessie Smith
- Clara Smith
- Connie Smith
- Joanna Smith (Columbia Nashville)
- JoJo Siwa
- Kate Smith
- Lonnie Smith
- O. C. Smith
- Patti Smith
- Rex Smith
- Will Smith
- Willie "Long Time" Smith
- Jussie Smollett
- Phoebe Snow
- Social Distortion
- Solange
- Joanie Sommers
- Sophie Beem (Parkwood Entertainment/Columbia)
- Soul Asylum
- South Border (Philippines)
- South Central Cartel (GWK/DJ West/RAL/Chaos/Columbia)
- South Park (Comedy Central/Columbia/WMG)
- Spandau Ballet (CBS)
- Sparks (US)
- Lucy Spraggan
- Rick Springfield
- Soda Stereo (Argentina) (Discos CBS/Columbia)
- Bruce Springsteen
- Spiral Starecase
- Natasha St-Pier
- Stabbing Westward
- Jo Stafford
- Mary Stafford
- The Stanley Brothers
- Ralph Stanley
- The Statler Brothers (Columbia Nashville, then Mercury Nashville)
- Lennon Stella
- Chris Stapleton
- Stereo Skyline
- Stereomud
- Isaac Stern
- Cal Stewart
- Larry Stewart (Columbia Nashville)
- Doug Stone (Columbia Nashville)
- Igor Strawinsky
- Barbra Streisand
- The Stunners
- Harry Styles
- Selah Sue
- Sunscreem
- Super Cat
- Superchick
- Surface
- Sweathog
- The Sweet
- Sweethearts of the Rodeo (Columbia Nashville)
- Switchfoot
- Syd
- System of a Down (American Recordings/Columbia)
- George Szell
- Shy Talk

== T ==
- T-Pain
- T-Square
- Gid Tanner & the Skillet Lickers
- Mikha Tambayong (Sony/Epic/Columbia Malaysia)
- Tame Impala
- Audrey Tapiheru (Sony/Columbia Malaysia)
- Taproot
- Angel Taylor
- James Taylor (1977-2007)
- Johnnie Taylor
- Ten City
- Tenacious D
- Terminator X (P.R.O. Division/RAL/Columbia)
- Khleo Thomas
- Josh Thompson (Columbia Nashville)
- The Thorns
- Three Days Grace
- The Three Degrees (Columbia/Philadelphia International)
- Three 6 Mafia (Hypnotize Minds/Columbia)
- Charles Davis Tillman
- The Ting Tings
- Libby Titus
- Toad The Wet Sprocket
- Mia Doi Todd
- Satoshi Tomīe (C2/Columbia)
- Mel Torme
- Daniel Tosh (Comedy Central/Columbia)
- Toto
- Henry Townsend
- Tommy Tutone
- Trackmasters (Track Masters/Columbia)
- Train
- Meghan Trainor
- Trance Dance
- Translator (415/Columbia)
- TripleS (Modhaus/Columbia; Korean Released Only)
- The Tremeloes
- Rick Trevino (Columbia Nashville)
- Travis Tritt (Columbia Nashville)
- Richard Tucker
- Orrin Tucker
- Tanya Tucker (Columbia Nashville)
- Leah Turner (Columbia Nashville)
- Twisted Wheel
- Bonnie Tyler
- Steve Tyrell
- Tye Tribbett & G.A.
- Tyga
- Tyler, The Creator
- The Kid LAROI (Grade A)
- Treasure (US)

== U ==
- Magnus Uggla
- James Blood Ulmer
- The Used

== V ==
- The Vaccines
- Jerry Vale
- V.I.C.
- Valencia
- Vampire Weekend
- Van Zant (Columbia Nashville)
- Sarah Vaughan
- The Vibrators
- Gilles Vigneault (Columbia of Canada)
- Andreas Vollenweider
- Grace VanderWaal
- Victorious cast (including Ariana Grande, Elizabeth Gillies, Victoria Justice, Leon Thomas III and Matt Bennett) (Nickelodeon under Columbia)

== W ==
- Walk Off the Earth (SlapDash/Columbia)
- Ron Wallace (Columbia Nashville)
- The Wallflowers
- Bruno Walter
- Wanderléa
- Wardruna
- Warrant
- War Babies
- Dionne Warwick
- Muddy Waters
- Roger Waters
- Mike Watt
- André Watts (Columbia Masterworks)
- Jeff "Tain" Watts
- Jeff Wayne
- The Weather Girls
- Weather Report
- Joan Weber
- Weezer (Hurley only)
- Freddy Weller
- Koe Wetzel
- Wet
- Kirk Whalum
- Wham! (US/Canada)
- Wheat
- Wheatus
- Whipping Boy
- Jack White (Third Man/Columbia)
- Maurice White
- Peter White
- White Denim
- Paul Whiteman
- Whitesnake (CBS, Japan)
- Whodini (So So Def/Columbia)
- Rusty Wier
- Wilderness Road
- Andy Williams
- Bert Williams
- James "D-Train" Williams
- Deniece Williams
- John Williams
- Michelle Williams
- Pharrell Williams
- Robbie Williams
- Trent Willmon (Columbia Nashville)
- Edith Wilson
- Gretchen Wilson (Columbia/Columbia Nashville)
- Teddy Wilson
- Wilson Phillips
- Wings (US/Canada)
- Edgar Winter
- Johnny Winter
- Wire Train (415/Columbia)
- Wolf Alice
- Michael Wolff
- Charles Wood (Columbia Masterworks)
- Ron Wood
- Worl-A-Girl (Chaos/Columbia)
- Rick Wright (outside Europe)
- Wu-Tang Clan (Loud/Columbia)

== X ==
- Xscape (So So Def/Columbia)
- Xzibit (Loud/Columbia)
- The X-Ecutioners (Loud/Columbia)
- XXXTentacion
- Lil Xan

== Y ==
- Billy Yates (Columbia Nashville)
- Lori Yates (Columbia Nashville)
- Yahritza y Su Esencia (Lumbre Music)
- Yelawolf
- Yes
- Pete Yorn
- Paul Young
- Tata Young
- Yazz the Greatest
- .Yvngxchris

== Z ==
- Hector Zazou
- Zebrahead
- Denny Zeitlin
- Jo Jo Zep & The Falcons (USA/Canada, Screaming Targets through Full Moon/Columbia)
- Zhavia
- ZHU
- ZZ Top
- Zerobaseone (Wake One/Columbia; Korean releases only)

== See also ==
- Columbia Records
