= List of Sony BMG Music Entertainment artists =

This is the list of artists which used to be signed with Sony BMG, defunct since 2008.

For music artists engaged with Sony Music Entertainment, see List of Sony Music artists.

== List of Sony BMG artists ==
=== A ===
- Aaron Carter
- Adam Lambert
- Adam Rachel
- AC/DC
- A. R. Rahman
- Aerosmith
- Afgan (Indonesia)
- Air Supply
- AJR
- Alan Jackson
- Alan Ko (Taiwan)
- Alan Parsons Project
- Alejandro Fernández (Mexico)
- Alexandra Burke
- Alice in Chains
- Alicia Keys
- Alkaline Trio
- Aloha from Hell
- Acha Septriasa (Indonesia)
- Alex Jacobowitz Germany
- Alyssa Soebandono (Indonesia)
- Amanda Seyfried
- Anna Vissi (Greece)
- Andity (Indonesia)
- Andy Lau (Hong Kong)
- Andy Williams
- Angel Down (Canada)
- Anna Tatangelo (Italy)
- Anggun (Indonesia)
- Annie Lennox
- Anti-Flag
- Antonis Remos (Greece)
- Anthony Callea
- Amy Pearson
- Aram Quartet (Italy)
- Aria Wallace (Sony Wonder)
- Ariel Rivera (Philippines)
- Asia Cruise
- Audioslave
- Audy (Indonesia)
- Avalon Drive
- Avril Lavigne (Canada)

=== B ===
- Backstreet Boys
- Baim (Indonesia)
- Beyoncé Knowles
- Bell Nuntita (Thailand)
- Big Mountain
- Billy Joel
- Bob Dylan
- Bobby Johnson
- Boney M.
- Bow Wow
- Bowling for Soup
- Boyzone (Hong Kong)
- Brad Paisley
- Brian Melo
- Brian Tyler (composer)
- Brandy
- Britney Spears
- Big Time Rush
- Brooke Barrettsmith
- Bruce Springsteen
- Bullet for My Valentine

=== C ===
- Costel Busuioc (Romania)
- Chevelle
- Caifanes (Mexico)
- Caillou (Canada) (Sony Wonder)
- Callalily (Philippines)
- Calle 13
- Calvin Harris
- Camila
- Carola Häggkvist
- Carrie Underwood
- Cathy Sharon (Indonesia)
- Celine Dion (Canada)
- Chad Kroeger (Canada)
- Chayanne
- Chipmunk (rapper)
- Chris Brown
- Chris Daughtry
- Christina Aguilera
- Classified
- Ciara
- Cindy Yen (Taiwan)
- Cinta Laura (Indonesia)
- Coheed and Cambria
- Colin Farrell (Ireland) (Columbia)
- Corbin Bleu (Hollywood)
- Courtney Johnson
- Cueshé (Philippines)
- C:Real
- Cyndi Lauper

=== D ===
- Dan Hartman
- Diana Yukawa
- Danny Gokey
- David Archuleta
- David Cook
- Dave Matthews Band
- David Gilmour
- Dead or Alive
- Delon (Indonesia)
- Delta Goodrem
- Diana Vickers (United Kingdom)
- Dido
- Dirly Idol (Indonesia)
- Dixie Chicks
- DMX
- Do
- Dolla
- Donald Duck (Germany, Austria, Swiss,) by Europa (record label) VOOZ Character System and Trickfilmstudio also the Pygos Group
- Duran Duran
- Destine
- Destiny's Child
- Davido (Nigeria)

=== E ===
- Earth, Wind & Fire
- Edward Maya
- Elena Paparizou (Greece)
- Elli Kokkinou (Greece)
- Elvis Presley
- El Canto del Loco (Spain)
- Eoghan Quigg (United Kingdom)
- The Eraserheads (Philippines)
- Eros Ramazzotti
- Eurythmics
- Evan Yo
- Evanescence

=== F ===
- Faye Wong (Hong Kong)
- Fey (Mexico)
- Fifth harmony
- Fireflight
- Fiona Apple
- Franz Ferdinand
- Livvi Franc
- The Fray
- Foo Fighters
- Frances Yip (Hong Kong)
- Frank Sinatra

=== G ===
- Gemelli Diversi
- George Michael
- George Sampson (United Kingdom)
- Gian Magdangal (Philippines)
- Gisel Idol (Indonesia)
- Gita Gutawa (Indonesia)
- Gustavo Cerati (Argentina)
- Giusy Ferreri
- Glenn Miller
- Gloria Estefan
- Gloria Trevi (Mexico)
- Good Charlotte
- Good Riddance
- Gretchen Espina (Philippines)

=== H ===
- Ha*Ash
- H-Blockx
- Howie Day
- The Hoosiers
- Hurts
- Huey, Dewey, and Louie (Europe, South America, Asia) by VOOZ Character System and Trickfilmstudio also the Pygos Group
- Helena Paparizou
- Hayley Warner

=== I ===
- Ivi Adamou (Greece)
- Ihsan Tarore (Indonesia)
- Incubus
- Indica (Finnish band)
- Indonesian Idol (Indonesia)
- INXS
- Il Divo
- Infectious Grooves
- Innosense
- Insane Clown Posse
- Iron Maiden
- Itchyworms (Philippines)

=== J ===
- J-Ax
- Jamie Lynn Spears
- Jay Chou (Taiwan)
- Jasmine Villegas
- Jennifer Hudson
- Jennifer Lopez
- Jeremy Renner (Columbia)
- Jessica Mauboy
- Jessica Simpson
- Jim Jones
- JLS (UK)
- Joaquín Sabina
- Joe Satriani
- Jedward
- John Mayer
- Johnny Cash
- Jordin Sparks
- Jorge Celedón
- Journey
- Juice WRLD
- Julie Feeney
- Julieta Venegas
- Justin Timberlake
- Jay Sean

=== K ===
- Kalan Porter
- Kaleth Morales (Colombian)
- Karen Mok (Hong Kong)
- Kat DeLuna
- Kaz James (Australia)
- KC Concepcion (Philippines)
- Keith Whitley
- Kelly Clarkson
- Kelly Rowland
- Kenny Chesney
- Kenny Loggins
- Kesha
- Kings of Leon
- Kool Savas
- KSI
- Kylie Minogue

=== L ===
- L'Arc-en-Ciel (Japan)
- La Diva (Philippines)
- La Oreja de Van Gogh (Spain)
- La Quinta Estación (Spain)
- Lara Liang (Taiwan)
- Lea Salonga (Philippines)
- LazyTown (German)
- Len Carlson (Canada) (Ariola)
- Leona Lewis (United Kingdom)
- Linda Andrews (Denmark)
- Lisa Lougheed (Canada) (Ariola)
- Lyfe Jennings
- Lordi (Finland)
- Logic
- Los Auténticos Decadentes (Argentina)
- Los Fabulosos Cadillacs (Argentina)
- Lostprophets (United Kingdom)
- Louise Carver
- Louis Tomlinson (United Kingdom)
- Lovi (Philippines)

=== M ===
- Martha Heredia
- Manchester Orchestra
- Marc Anthony
- Marco Mengoni
- Maria Lawson
- Maria Mena
- Mariah Carey
- Mario
- Marvin Gaye
- Massari
- Mayré Martínez
- Melanie Thornton
- Mew
- Michael Jackson
- Michael Magee (Canada) (Ariola)
- Michelle Williams
- Mika Nakashima (Japan)
- Miranda Cosgrove
- Modern Talking
- Monica Arnold
- Mónica Naranjo (Spain)
- Moonstar88 (Philippines)
- Moymoy Palaboy (Philippines)

=== N ===
- Nâdiya
- Natalie Imbruglia (United Kingdom)
- Natasha Bedingfield
- Neffa (Italy)
- Newton Faulkner
- New Kids on the Block
- Nakaaya Sumari (Tanzania)
- Nicola Roberts
- Nickelback
- 'N Sync
- Nindy (Indonesia)

=== O ===
- Oasis
- The Offspring
- One Direction
- OJ
- Ozzy Osbourne
- Outkast
- Outlandish

=== P ===
- Patti Smith
- Paula DeAnda
- Paul Potts
- Pearl Jam
- Pink
- Pitbull
- Pingu (South Korea) and also VOOZ Character System
- Pupil (Philippines)

=== Q ===
- Qwote

=== R ===
- Rachel Smith (Indonesia)
- Red
- Ray Parker Jr.
- R. Kelly
- Rage Against the Machine
- Rainie Yang (Taiwan)
- Ricardo Arjona (Guatemala; Mexico)
- Rick Astley
- Ricky Martin (Puerto Rico)
- Rini Idol (Indonesia)
- Rivermaya (Philippines)
- Robin Beck (Germany) (DSB, Portrait, Reality Entertainment)
- Robbie Williams (United Kingdom)
- Rogue Traders
- Ruby Gloom (Japan) (Sony)
- Ruth Lorenzo (United Kingdom)
- R.K.M & Ken-Y (Puerto Rico)

=== S ===
- Samanda
- Samantha Jade
- Santana
- Scouting for Girls
- Sean Kingston
- Selena Gomez (Malaysia, 2007–2009)
- Shakira(Colombia)
- Shandy Aulia (Indonesia)
- Sharon Jessica (Indonesia)
- Sharon Cuneta (Philippines)
- SHE Band (Indonesia)
- Spandau Ballet (United Kingdom)
- Spike (Peanuts character) (Japan) (Epic)
- Spiral Starecase
- Soda Stereo (Argentina)
- Steps
- Simon & Garfunkel
- Steve Barakatt
- Stevie Wonder
- System of a Down
- The Strokes
- Slayer
- Shayne Ward
- Suicidal Tendencies
- Susan Boyle
- Stan Walker

=== T ===
- Tata Young (Thailand)
- Thalía
- The Changcuters (Indonesia)
- The Fly (Indonesia)
- The New Cities
- The Script
- The Ting Tings
- Three Days Grace
- Three 6 Mafia
- Tommy Kurniawan (Indonesia)
- Toni Braxton
- T-Pain
- Trisha Yearwood

=== U ===
- Usher

=== V ===
- Víctor Manuelle
- Virginia Maestro (Spain)
- VL Mike
- Velvet Revolver
- Victoria Justice

=== W ===
- Waldo's People (Finland)
- Waterparks
- Wayang (Indonesia)
- Whitney Houston
- "Weird Al" Yankovic
- Westlife
- Wild Light
- Will Smith
- Worrawech Danuwong (Thailand)
- Wu-Tang Clan

=== Y ===
- YUI (Japan)
- Yuna Ito (Japan)
- Yuridia

=== Z ===
- Zoboomafoo (Canada) (Sony Wonder)
