= Tatsuya Oe =

Japanese composer (born 1969)

Tatsuya Oe オオエタツヤ
- Born: 28 November 1969 (age 56); Hiroshima, Hiroshima, Japan
- Genres: Electronic, dance, rock, pop, sound design
- Occupations: Recording artist, composer, sound designer, DJ, Founder of Model Electronic Inc.
- Instruments: Guitar, keyboards, bass, vocals, computer programming
- Years active: 1997–present
- Label: Model Electronic

Tatsuya Oe (オオエタツヤ, Ōe Tatsuya) (born 28 November 1969) is a New York-based Japanese composer, recording artist, music producer, and DJ, best known for the moniker of Captain Funk.

He is known for his mastery and diversity of composition and music production in electronic, dance, rock, pop, and dramatic scores. In addition to commercial releases under recording artist monikers of Captain Funk, (Tatsuya) OE, and Dark Model, he has composed for and has been often featured on TV, film, video games, animation projects, and corporate branding campaigns in the US, Europe, and Asia markets. In July 2012, his composed piece as Dark Model was included on the first footage reel of 2013 movie Elysium (starring: Matt Damon, Jodie Foster. dir: Neill Blomkamp) played at San Diego Comic-Con.

Tatsuya has collaborated with or remixed numerous artists/bands such as James Brown, Diana Ross, Chic, Simon Le Bon, Ron Sexsmith, Serge Gainsbourg, and many other icons. He is also called "Remix Wizard."

Oe participated in Panasonic's global branding movie Experience Color which won "The Finalist Award" in New York Festivals, as well as "Silver Prize" for the Tokyo Interactive Ad Awards. Norman Cook (Fatboy Slim) described his music as "F***ing insane!" Captain Funk's album, "Songs of the Siren," was selected by Billboard for their feature story "Year in Music 2001/Critic's Choice", and his song "Twist & Shout" was featured as a theme song in SABU's movie "Monday." In autumn 2013, he relocated from Japan to the United States.

In April 2018, Oe won the 16th Annual Independent Music Awards (IMA) for Best Dance/Electronica Album with "Saga," the second album as Dark Model.

== Life and career ==
=== Early career and birth of Captain Funk ===
Tatsuya Oe was born in Hiroshima, Japan. At the age of 12, he showed great interest in rock, pop, and electronic music, and at the age of 14, decided to buy his first electric guitar, synthesizer, and sequencer. In school days he formed several bands performing rock, synthpop/new wave, heavy metal, and even prog rock. While he couldn't find bandmates for playing his favorite funk or black music since those kinds of music was nearly unknown in Japan at that time, a few years later he found excitement in playing DJ to the audience and got attracted by dance/club music such as rare groove, disco, house, and hip hop. After he majored in economics at and graduated from Tokyo University, while working for an advertising company, he started composition/music production with his computer. His demo tapes were acclaimed by several European dance/techno labels and he released his debut 12 inches called Dazzlin' from Italian label ACV under the name of Tatsuya Oe in 1997. Since Encounter with... album (1998), he burst onto the club scene as the maverick solo project "Captain Funk."

"Captain Funk will make you believe!” was The Ministry of Sound magazine’s opinion, while Time Out Mag described his music as a "Vibrant delight!” Fatboy Slim (Norman Cook) described his record as "F***ing insane!” and demanded extra copies. The Fatboy was not alone obviously, as Tatsuya has earned the praise and respect of international DJs from across the board such as Coldcut, Si Begg, Freddy Fresh, Ken Ishii and Carl Cox. Captain Funk released successful singles, mix CDs and albums including Bustin' Loose EP, Dancing in the Street, Style, etc. Especially his second album Songs of the Siren was selected as one of "The Year in Music 2001 Critic’s Choice" of the Billboard magazine. The magazine’s Asia Bureau Chief Steve McClure said, “the Captain takes his listeners on a high-energy, roller-coaster ride on an album full of reckless beats, brilliantly employed samples, and punchy rock guitar.”

Metropolis described the album, "Listeners familiar with his last release, Songs of the Siren, will recognize many of the elements that made the album one of the most original and musically innovative to come out of Japan in the last two years."

He also has played DJ at many gigs and big events in Japan such as Fuji Rock Festival and overseas including UK (Turnmills, Heaven, etc.), France (Global Tekno, Festival de Saint-Nolff, etc.), Germany, Hong Kong, Singapore and South Korea.

=== As Captain Funk ===
After the experience of several DJ tours, including ones with Space Cowboy, he founded his own company, Model Electronic Inc., which he manages. The company focuses on music production, sound design and label/publishing management.

As the first project of this company, he released Captain Funk's albums, Heavy Metal and Heavy Mellow (2007). These albums display his way of fusing together the early Captain Funk's uplifting vibes and his songwriting skills acquired through OE's works. Several tracks, as represented by "Hey Boy, Hey Girl" feat. Meri Neeser, not only became popular in Japan but also was played in overseas radios, parties, and shops such as Club Sandwich and Dior Homme shop in Paris.

In 2008 his company Model Electronic Inc launched a new online shop called "Club Model Electronic". "It's a membership based company/label's "direct shop" to deliver our sounds & exclusive info to listeners, especially in the areas where our products have been hardly purchasable."

While continuing collaboration and remix work for other artists such as Dúné, Radiopilot and Ami Suzuki, in August 2009 he released Captain Funk's next album Sunshine in Japan (worldwide in October 2010), which includes "Weekend (kissing, touching, tasting, loving)" feat. Adnan Kurtov and "Piece of you" feat. Meri Neeser. "Weekend" was ranked in several radio charts in Japan, and "Piece of You" was featured by Forever 21 (US) for their sales promotion and aired in nine movie theaters in the western United States, as well as in Forever 21's 400+ stores.

In July 2011, the latest release as Captain Funk "Versions2011" got ranked No.1 in "Dance/Electronica" & No.2 in "Pops" at MP3 Album chart on Amazon.co.jp.

In July 2013, Tatsuya released "Chronicles 2007-2013, Vol. 1 & 2″(all 98 tracks) in the form of digital download, which was the collection of tracks which have been produced since 2007 under the moniker of Captain Funk.

In February 2014, Captain Funk "Endless Possibilities (feat. Raj Ramayya)” was featured in ABC Family's TV drama “Switched at Birth. Also "Somebody Like You feat. Meri Neeser" was used in the trailer of web channel "Wigs" drama "Blue (Season 3)" starring Julia Stiles. TV Land’s romantic-comedy-drama “Younger” featured Captain Funk “Leaving” in Season 2 Ep 11 “Secrets & Liza.” In January 2016, an official international trailer of Sony Pictures “Money Monster (starring George Clooney & Julia Roberts)” used Captain Funk “Endless Possibilities (Percussive Instrumental Mix).” Also, the streaming version of “Charmed” (Season 5) Ep 5), an American supernatural drama television series, used Captain Funk's “Rise” in the opening scene.

In June 2019, Oe released “Oceans,” an original full-length album as Captain Funk for the first time in ten years, consisting of ten instrumental tracks in the style of electronic jazz-funk, tropical dance music, and downtempo. Following the release, Oe has continued to produce Captain Funk's albums such as "Metropolis" and "Night Music," based on jazz-funk and nu-disco instrumental style. 2021 release "Sail and Cruise," a compilation and mix album collecting tracks composed and produced by Oe himself.

Netflix's comedy-drama "Emily in Paris" featured Captain Funk's "Just Wanna Get You Tonight" on the S1, E7 "French Ending" (Oct, 2020).

In 2023 and 2024, three popular Captain Funk albums, "Heavy Metal," "Heavy Mellow," and "Sunshine," were newly mixed and released as "Deluxe Editions." Oe explained, "The top priority for releasing these new mix versions was to 'update' them musically so listeners could enjoy them with their current sensibilities."

=== As OE ===
From the 2002 release Here and You, he started another solo project simply under his real last name OE to focus more on cutting-edge and introspective music. After collaboration with Otomo Yoshihide's New Jazz Quintet "ONJQ+OE“, he released two albums Physical Fiction and Director’s Cut. During his OE era, he did an opening act for Kraftwerk, Holger Czukay, and David Bowie (as Groove Syndicate) in their Japan tours. On May 24, 2003, as a producer, Oe was in charge of “mod's hair Discover your style 2003 - OE Electronic Sound and Vision Collection,” held at Aoyama Spiral Cafe. Besides OE, Buffalo Daughter and Numb performed at the event.

In 2018, Oe's record label Model Electronic Records released "New Classics Vol.1 & 2" albums, which are collections of new tracks and new arrangements of his past pieces produced under the moniker of OE. While vol.1 focuses on the indie rock/pop electronica and songwriter-oriented side of the project, vol.2 delves into the contemporary, edgy, and experimental side. "New Classics Vol.2" was nominated for the 17th Independent Music Awards (IMA) in the Dance/Electronica Album category.

In 2020, Oe released a full-ambient album, “Suchness,” which consists of ten “Kankyo-Ongaku” (ambient music) compositions, which are inspired by the Japanese view of nature and Zen philosophy.

Max (HBO Max) 's popular animation program "Ambient Swim" featured OE's track "Cloud Sea," included in the album "Suchness," on their episode "Tradigital (S1.E1)."

Oe continued to release albums under the concept of Suchness, such as "Suchness 2" in 2022, "Starry Messenger (Suchness 3) (2024)," and "Seisei Ruten (Suchness 4)" in 2024.

The Watches of Switzerland USA, a US luxury watch retailer, featured OE's "Garden Fountains," which is included in "Seisei Ruten (Suchness 4), in their promotional film "Kodama featuring GRAND SEIKO," which introduces George Nakashima Woodworkers in Bucks County, PA.

The 2023 album “Compositions in Blue” was produced in the vein of what Oe had developed from “Here and You” to “New Classics Vol.1 & 2” under the name OE. The album's leading track, Mobius," was licensed and featured in the luxury brand Prada's Instagram video.

In April 2024, Oe released "Early Techno Works 9697," a collection that mainly consists of unreleased tracks made in 1996, when Oe embarked on full-fledged music production, and 1997, before he debuted as Captain Funk with its album "Encounter with…."

While the following release ”Composition in Light" inherits the minimalist and progressive approach showcased in last year's "Compositions in Blue," the album features more groovy and rhythmical tracks, resulting in a vibrant and dynamic album.

=== As Dark Model ===
In 2012 June, Tatsuya launched his new project Dark Model which is focused on edgy, epic, and cinematic instrumental music. The music of Dark Model is based on a concept that Oe has unvaryingly embraced throughout his career: incorporating a diverse range of musical ideas and elements into what he calls “Musical Narratives.” In 2012, his composed piece as Dark Model was included on the first footage of the 2013 movie Elysium (starring Matt Damon and Jodie Foster).

In 2012 Dec, Dark Model "Oath (Dubstep Remix)” was licensed and featured in Verizon Wireless TV Commercial "Droid DNA -Extra Sensory" with its artwork, which was aired all over the U.S. Dark Model's music has been licensed and used in numerous media projects, including cinema trailers for films such as "The Paperboy" (starring Zac Efron, Nicole Kidman, John Cusack) and in advertising campaigns for Lexus, Oakley, Xbox, Wilson Sporting Goods, among others.

In 2014 May, half a year after Tatsuya relocated from Japan to the United States, Tatsuya's label Model Electronic released the debut album of Dark Model in the form of CD and digital downloads. Under the Gun Review magazine described it as “one of the best electronic music efforts in recent memory and easily one of the most grandiose and memorable of 2014 (score 9.5/10).”

“Judgment Day,” included in this album, has been licensed and featured in a lot of TV programs such as Netflix “Comedians In Cars Getting Coffee: Jimmy Fallon,” TV Show “Révolution” (Canada), “Big Knockout Boxing” (DirecTV), and “Hibernation” by State Theatre Company South Australia.

“Judgment Day” got 1.64 million plays on NetEase Cloud Music, a Chinese music streaming service, from May 2020 until Aug 2021. As of December 2023, the total amount reached 4.2 million.

“Abandoned,” also included in this album, was licensed and used in an advertising campaign of Tom Ford‘s “Soleil Neige” in 2021.

In 2017 March, Dark Model's second album Saga was released. In addition to the original release in the U.S., and the album was licensed and released in Japan. Music-news.com (UK) wrote, "If you’re looking for more out of electronic music than five-second loops and bass drops, dig into Dark Model.”

In April 2018, Saga won the 16th Annual Independent Music Award (IMA) for Best Dance/Electronica Album.

Oe has continued to produce Dark Model's original albums including "Flashback" (2019) and "Driving Orchestral Electro Mix" (2020).

In September 2022, Oe released "Odyssey" and its instrumental edition, the 4th full-album of Dark Model. Odyssey is a scaled-up version of the 2017 release "Saga" in its epic and cinematic electronic music, while it features more choir sounds than any previous album.

In the 2022 album "Impulse," Oe leaned toward a more contemporary and futuristic soundscape while setting itself apart from its conventional classical and apocalyptic style. In "Relentless," released in 2023, Oe displayed a “relentlessly fighting mode” album full of dramatic and epic hybrid music.

=== As MER ===
MER is not just an abbreviated name of Model Electronic Records, a record label owned by Oe, but another music project of his. This project specializes in producing “sync-conscious” instrumental music, adding excitement and imagination to movie trailers, film, TV, and commercials. Oe released the first public album “Anti-Crime Breaks,” a collection of thrilling and badass jazz-funk and breakbeat tracks reminiscent of soundtracks from the late 1970s crime action and detective movies.

“Soul Funk Ska Moods: Groovy Ska and Rocksteady Mixes,” the second public album as MER, collects groovy and upbeat ska/rocksteady mixes of Tatsuya's past songs. It also includes deep, downbeat tracks reminiscent of traditional UK and Jamaican dub sounds.

Button Down Radio—Ska and Northern Soul, a radio station from Manchester, UK, chose this album as “Featured This Week.”

MER's song "Mirage" was licensed and featured in the cosmetic brand Estee Lauder Korea's promo videos, which also featured the singer IU.

=== Composition and licensed music ===
He has not only composed for but also licensed a lot of his music to commercials, TV, film, video games, animation projects, and corporate branding campaigns in the US, Europe, and Asia markets.

He runs his own music library, Model Electronic Music Library (formerly Club Model Electronic), for licensing his compositions to music and media professionals. As of 2014, his music has been licensed and used in TV advertising and promotion movies in the US territory of Burger King, Skechers, Oprah Winfrey Network, and Macy's.

== Awards ==
- The Finalist Award of New York Festivals
- Silver Prize of the Tokyo Interactive Ad Awards
- Official Honoree of Webby Awards

(for music/sound design of Panasonic Experience Color, with Business Architects Inc.)

- Independent Music Awards (IMA) "Best Dance/Electronica Album" (for Dark Model "Saga")

== Music Placement ==
=== US & International market ===
==== Advertising / Corporate Video ====
- Pepsi (Pepsi Max featuring Kylie Irving, 2012, Sync License)
- Burger King ("Bacon & Cheddar BK Toppers" TV commercial, 2012, Sync License)
- Forever 21 (Multiple placements including Captain Funk "Piece of You", Sync License)
- Skechers (TV commercials, 2012, Composition)
- Macy's MstyleLab (2012, Sync License)
- Microsoft (2011, Sync License)
- Panasonic (Composition for Experience Color)
- Bain & Company (2012, Sync License)
- Dance Battle VS (PS3, Hyperkin) (Captain Funk "Somebody Like You", "Diamonds", Sync License)
- Team Type1 (2012, Sync License)
- Coloplast (2012, Sync License)
- Tennis Australia (2012, Sync License)
- ELLE (Brazil) (TV commercial, 2012, Sync License)
- Oakley “Beyond Season” (2012, Sync License)
- Verizon Wireless “Droid” TV Commercial (2012, Sync License, dark model website)
- Patagonia (2013, Sync License)
- Lexus ES 2013/2014 Commercial (Sync License)
- Mountain Dew / PepsiCo. (2013, Sync License)
- Skype Technologies (US) (2013, Sync License)
- ASUS + intel “IN SEARCH OF INCREDIBLE.” (2013, Sync License)
- Bergdorf Goodman (2013, Sync License)
- WWE “WrestleMania 33” TV Commercial (2016, Captain Funk “Endless Possibilities”)
- Quiksilver “Bali’s Big Eco Weekend” (2015, Sync License, Tatsuya oe website)
- Quiksilver/Roxy #MakeWavesMoveMountains (2018, Sync License, dark model website)
- Mongoose bicycles (2018, Sync License)
- Tom Ford Beauty "Soleil Neige" (TV commercial, 2022, Sync License)
- Specialized Bicycle (2016, 2017, Sync License)
- Go Pro (US) (2017, Sync License)
- Lancome (2016, Sync License)
- Hollister Co. (Apparel, US) (2016, Sync License)
- Fox Head Inc. (“Fox Wake Presents – Rusty Malinoski We Live” and Multiple placements)
- Burton Snowboards/ Anon Optics “M3”
- Verizon “Verizon Fios” TV Commercial (2015, Sync License)
- LinkedIn Corporation (2014, Sync License)
- Sun Bum “Bum Rush Tour” (2023, Sync License)
- The Watches of Switzerland "Kodama featuring GRAND SEIKO (2023, Sync License)
- Prada (@Prada) “Prada Mode Seoul” (2023, Sync License)
- Estee Lauder “Estee Lauder Korea x IU” (2024, Sync License)

==== TV programs/promos ====
- Oprah Winfrey Network "Welcome to Sweetie Pie's" TV/Radio Promo (2012, Sync License)
- Fox Network (Sync License)
- Fox Network "The Mindy Project", “Who Shot Biggie And Tupac” “MLB on Fox”
- "Teen Choice Awards" (Sync License)
- Fox Sports "NFL on Fox"
- Style Network (Sync License)
- Syfy (Sync License)
- BBC (Sync License)
- ABC Family "Switched at Birth" (Season 3 Episode 5 “Have You Really the Courage?”).(2014), (Season 4 Episode 3 “I Lock the Door Upon Myself”)(2015)
- MTV (“Bugging Out,” “Brothers Green Eats,”” “Middle of the Night Show”, ”Guy Code”, ”Girl Code”
- TLC (“Say Yes to the Dress”)
- ESPN (“ESPN College Basketball,” “ESPN College Football”, “Fight Flashback UFC” “Saturday Night Football”)
- Fashion Television
- Bravo TV (“Flipping Out”)
- Discovery Channel (“Auction Kings,””Turn and Burn”, “Buying Alaska”, “Diesel Brothers”)
- Sundance Channel (“Push Girls”, “Dream School USA”)
- National Geographic (“Brain Games,”“How Human Are You”, “Cesar Millan: The Real Story”, “Jobs That Bite!,”)
- VH1 (“Rupaul’s Drag Race”, “Love Hip Hop Atlanta”, “T.I. & Tiny: The Family Hustle”, “Love And Hip Hop Hollywood” )
- CMT (“Brojects in the House”)
- A&E Networks
- Bell Media Television (Canada)
- Telemundo Television Network (Senora Acero 3, “Marido en alquiler”)
- Vice (“Needles & Pins”, “Epicly Later’d – Spike Jonze”, “Most Expensivest”, “King Of The Road”, “Fuck, That's Delicious Classics”, “Moltissimo”, “Big Night Out”, “Criminal Planet”)
- CNN/HLN (“The seventies”, “True Crime Live”, “On the Story with Erica Hill”)
- Nickelodeon (“SpongeBob SquarePants”, “Dude Perfect”, “The Loud House”, “I Am Frankie”, “Paw Patrol (Promo)", “Blaze and the Monster Machines (Promo)")
- Comedy Central (“Daily Show with Trevor Noah”, “Tosh.0”, “@midnight with Chris Hardwick”)
- Paramount Network (“Bar Rescue”, “I Am Dale Earnhardt”, “Ink Master”)
- CW “Life Sentence”
- History (“Forged in Fire”, “Alone”, “American Restoration,””Counting Cars”, “How the States Got Their Shapes”, “American Pickers”, “Lost Car Rescue”)
- TBS (“Full Frontal With Samantha Bee”)
- TruTV “Friends of the People”, “Big Trick Energy”
- TV Land “Younger” Season 2, Ep. 11 “Secrets & Liza” (References: already linked above), “Nobodies” (Captain Funk “Talk Too Much”)
- Food Network (“Beat Bobby Flay”, “Guilty Pleasures”)
- NBC (“Steve Harvey,” “The Voice”, “Saturday Night Live”)
- HBO (“Last Week Tonight With John Oliver”, “Vice News Tonight”)
- Netflix (“Comedians In Cars Getting Coffee”, “Emily in Paris”, S1, EP7 "French Ending, “Los Carcamales”)
- Global TV (Canada) “Private Eyes”
- AHC (American Heroes Channel) (“Bullet points,” “Shadow Ops”)
- CBS (“Big Bang Theory”, “Late Show With Stephen Colbert”)
- DirecTV (“Big Knockout Boxing”)
- The WB "Charmed" (S5E5, New Streaming Version)
- Max (HBO Max) "Ambient Swim: S1.E1 – Tradigital",“Legendary EP1 – Welcome to My House", “Generation Hustle”
- HGTV “Gut Job”
- Investigation Discovery “People Magazine Investigates”
- TVA (Canada) “Révolution” Season2 "Guillaume Michaud VS Cindy Mateus"

=== Japan & Asia Market ===
- Canon (Composition for "PIXUS" TV commercial)
- Shiseido (Composition for TV commercials including "MAQuillAGE" and "White Lucent")
- Uniqlo (Composition for TV commercials including "Body Tech" and "Premium Down")
- Pola (Composition)
- Mitsubishi Motors (Composition)
- Unilever (Composition for TV commercial and cent planning for "mod's hair" brand)
- Sony Mobile Communications (Composition for TV commercials including "W44S", "SO703i", and "S905")
- Zoff (Composition for TV commercials including "Zoff Black")
- Suehiro (Composition for TV commercials)
- SEGA (Composition for TV commercials including "Joypolis")
- Konami (Composition)
- Namco Bandai (Sync License for TV commercial)
- NHK (Composition)
- NTV (Nippon Television) (Composition for TV drama Message)
- Museum of Contemporary Art Tokyo (Composition for TV commercial)
- 21st Century Museum of Contemporary Art, Kanazawa (Composition)
- Hilton Tokyo (Composition for their compilation album)
- First Lane DVD (Red Eye's Film, 2007, Sync License)
- Caltier (Event sponsorship)
- Vivienne Westwood (Event sponsorship)
- G-Star (Event sponsorship)
- Chrysler/Dodge (Event sponsorship)

=== Film/Trailer/Animation/Game ===
- Elysium, the first footage reel (played at Comic-Con in 2012, Sync License)
- Dragon and Clouds (Short movie for Shohaku Soga's Dragon and Clods exhibited in the Museum of Fine Arts, Boston. Director:Noriyuki Tanaka)
- Tokyo Designers Block DVD (2005)
- Table & Fishman (director: Osamu Kobayashi, Studio4c, 2002)
- Monday ("Twist & Shout" as the theme song. director: SABU, the International Film Critics Association Award in Berlin International Film Festival)
- Tekken (Bandai Namco)
- "The Paperboy" TV Spot (starring: Matthew McConaughey, Zac Efron, Nicole Kidman, John Cusack & Macy Gray)
- Northern Ballet (UK, "Brief Landing". Directed and choreographed by Daniel de Andrade, 2013 Sync License)
- Father's Garden: The Love of My Parents (Germany, Vaters Garten - Die Liebe meiner Eltern)(2013)
- Microsoft Xbox (Video Game, US) Forza Motorsport 5 (2014)
- Blizzard Entertainment/World of Warcraft ““Warlords of Draenor” Promo (2015)
- Blizzard Entertainment “Overwatch” Trailer (2017)
- Mr. X Inc/Technicolor SA (Visual Effects company) Reel
- State Theatre Company South Australia “Hibernation” (2021)
- Sony Pictures “Money Monster” (starring George Clooney & Julia Roberts) Official International Trailer (2016)
- Paramount Pictures “The Space Between” TV Spot (starring Kelsey Grammer, William Fichtner, Julia Goldani Telles)

== Discography ==
=== Captain Funk ===
==== Studio Albums/Mini-Albums ====
- Encounter with…(1998) (Music Mine/Media Factory)
- Bustin' Loose (1998) (Music Mine/Media Factory)
- Dancing in the Street (1999) (Music Mine/Media Factory)
- Who Got Your Mojo Workin' (2000) (Music Mine/Media Factory)
- Songs of the Siren (2000) (Music Mine/Media Factory)
- Losing My Way (2001) (Music Mine/Media Factory)
- Heavy Metal (2007) (Model Electronic)
- Heavy Mellow (2007) (Model Electronic)
- Sunshine (2009) (Model Electronic)
- Versions2011 (2011) (Model Electronic)
- Chronicles 2007-2013, Vol. 1 & 2 (2013) (Model Electronic)
- Oceans (2019) (Model Electronic)
- Metropolis (2019) (Model Electronic)
- Night Music (2020) (Model Electronic)
- Sail and Cruise (2021) (Model Electronic)
- Heavy Mellow (Deluxe Edition) & [Instrumentals] (2023) (Model Electronic)
- Sunshine (Deluxe Edition) & [Instrumentals] (2023) (Model Electronic)
- Heavy Metal (Deluxe Edition) & [Instrumentals] (2024) (Model Electronic)

==== 12-inch Vinyl ====
- Rollercoaster E.P. (Reel Music)
- O.Y.M (Reel Music)
- O.Y.M Remixes (Reel Music)
- Tracks of the Siren Pt.1 (Reel Music)
- Tracks of the Siren Pt.2 (Reel Music)

=== OE/Tatsuya Oe ===
- Dazzlin' (1997) (ACV)
- Copa Feelin' (1997) (ACV)
- Here and You (2002) (Music Mine)
- Physical Fiction (2003) (P-Vine)
- Director's Cut (2004) (P-Vine)
- ONJQ+OE (with Otomo Yoshihide New Jazz Quartet) (P-Vine)
- Into the Echo (2006) (Digitally released)
- New Classics Vol.1 & Vol.2 (2018) (Model Electronic)
- Suchness (2020) (Model Electronic)
- Suchness 2 (2023)
- Compositions in Blue (2023)
- Starry Messenger (Suchness 3) (2024) (Model Electronic)
- Seisei Ruten (Suchness 4) (2024) (Model Electronic)
- Early Techno Works 9697 (2024) (Model Electronic)
- Compositions in Light (2024) (Model Electronic)

=== Dark Model ===
- Dark Model (2014) (Model Electronic)
- Saga (2017) (Model Electronic)
- Oath (2018) (Single) (Model Electronic)
- Flashback (2019) (Model Electronic)
- Driving Orchestral Electro Mix (2020) (Model Electronic)
- Odyssey (2022) (Model Electronic)
- Odyssey (Instrumental Edition) (2022) (Model Electronic)
- Impulse (2022) (Model Electronic)
- Relentless (2023) (Model Electronic)

=== MER ===
- Anti-Crime Breaks: Thrilling and Badass Jazz Funk Tracks (2021) (Model Electronic)

=== Remix/Arrangement (excerpt) ===
- James Brown - "Cold Sweat" (Tatsuya Oe Dry Mix) (Universal Sigma)
- Chic - "Good Times" (Captain Funk Remix) (Universal Sigma)
- Diana Ross & The Supremes - "Theme from Mahogany" (Captain Funk Punky-Nighty Mix) (Universal Sigma)
- Serge Gainsbourg - "Poupee de Cire, Poupee de Son" (feat. Noriko, Universal France)
- Simon Le Bon/Nick Wood - "Nobody Knows" (Captain Funk Remix) (Syn Records)
- Digikid84 - "You Got to Groove" (Captain Funk Remix) (Folistar)
- Radiopilot - "Monster" ("CF Tokyo Love Affiair Mix" & "CF Electric Rendezvous Mix") (Sony BMG Germany)
- Dune - John Wayne vs Mary Chaine (Captain Funk Glitter Knight club mix) (Sony BMG Germany)
- Demolition Disco - Big Mama (Captain Funk Epic Suite Remix) (Riot Riot)
- Hotei - Vampire (Captain Funk Mix) (EMI Japan)
- Date Course Pentagon Royal Garden - "Catch44.1" (OE reconstruction) (P-Vine)
- Anna Tsuchiya - "Somebody Help Me" ("'80CBGB Bootleg Mix" & "'89Remember Acid Mix") (Avex)
- Tommy February6 - "Everyday at the Bus Stop" (Captain Funk "Daydream" Edition) (Sony)
- Puffy - "Ai-no-Shirushi" (CF Puffy de Samba Mix) (SME)
- FPM - "You Must Learn All Night Long" (Captain Funk Flamingo Mix) (Columbia Japan)
- Yasuyuki Okamura - "Mashumaro Honeymoon" (Co-production)
- Zoobombs - "Jumbo" (Arranger/Co-production) (EMI/Virgin)
- Ken Ishii - "Actio Surrealismo" (Captain Funk Rampage Remix) (SME)
- Original Love - "Daisyarin" (Captain Funk remix) (EMI Japan)
- Manta1000 - "Prenom Betty" (Captain Funk Last Hustle in Paris remix) (Barclay/Universal France)
- Denki Groove - "Asunaro-Sunshine" (Captain Funk remix) (Kioon Sony)
- The Arrows - "Night Call" (Captain Funk Glitter Knight Club Mix) (Pony Canyon)
- Spank Happy (Arranger, "Sweets","Riot in Chocolate Logos", and "De Venus a Anthoinette") (King Records)

=== Soundtracks ===
- Message (2004, NTV)
- Monday Soundtrack (2001, Monsoon)

=== Compilations ===
- Noriyuki Tanaka with OE/Tesserart (CD-ROM, 2006)
- A Celebration of Miracles-Diamonds and Botswana (2006, DTC)
- Twenty One by Hilton Tokyo (2005, SYN)
- Tokyo Sound System 2 (2006, Tokyo Sound System 2)
- Tokyo Designers Block DVD vol.1(2004)
- Let There Be Pop -Christopher Just Remixes From 1995 To 2003 (2003, Giant Wheel)
- The March (2002) (in compilation album "WKM -Tribute to Walkman" (Gate records))
- N (2001, Camelco)
- Style#08 Captain Funk (Mix CD, 1999, Toshiba EMI)
- Dancemania Winters 2 (1999, Toshiba EMI)
- Dancemania Winters Rockgroove (1999, Toshiba EMI)
- Krafty Kuts presents Slam the Breaks (1999, Lacerba)
- Future Electronica (1999, Sony Music Associates)
- All Mixed Up (1999, Sm:)e Communications)
- Avenue A Presents Something Else Vol.2 (1999, R&S Records)
- Skank You Too (1999, Essential Dance Music)
- Bomb Boutique (1999, Area Code 221/EFA)
- Burning Big Beats (1999, SPV Recordings)
- Born To Ill 3 (1999, Music Mine)
- CTI Classics featuring Captain Funk Urban Showcase (1999, King Records)
- Japanese Homegrown Beats (1998, Tower Records)
- DJ's Works Vol.1 (1997, Music Mine)
- Warning (1997) (in compilation album "Pacific State" (Deviant UK))
- Kibou (2011, Elektrax Music)

=== Collaborators ===
==== Recording/Production ====
- Ron Sexsmith
- Tomotasu Hotei
- Otomo Yoshihide
- Naruyoshi Kikuchi
- Raj Ramayya
- Ken Ishii
- Nick Wood
- Meri Neeser
- Adnan Kurtov
- Zoobombs
- Yasuyuki Okamura
- Ami Suzuki
- Takeshi Ito
- Freddy Fresh
- Kyon
- Black Bottom Brass Band
- Robert Taleghany (Film Director)
- SABU (Film Director)
- Noriyuki Tanaka (Art Director)
- Osamu Kobayashi (Animator, Studio 4 °C)
- Ben List (Video Director)

==== In Concert/On Tour ====
- David Bowie (as Groove Syndicate)
- Kraftwerk
- Holger Czukay
- Space Cowboy (Tour)
- Atomic Hooligan (Tour)
- Date Course Pentagon Royal Garden (Tour)
