= Dark Model =

Electronic music project by Tatsuya Oe

- Origin: New York City, United States; Tokyo, Japan
- Genres: Electronica, neoclassical
- Years active: 2012–present
- Label: Model Electronic
- Members: Tatsuya Oe
- Website: darkmodelmusic.com

Dark Model is an electronic music project founded by music producer Tatsuya Oe, based in the United States and Japan. The project focuses on orchestral-electronic and storytelling-themed instrumental music. The project has released three full albums so far, and its music has been licensed and featured in many media projects, from box office film trailers to advertising campaigns.

In April 2018, Dark Model's second album "Saga" won the 16th Annual Independent Music Awards (IMA) for Best Dance/Electronica Album.

== Foundation and early works (2012–2013) ==
Oe, who had been also known as electronic dance music producer/DJ Captain Funk since the late 90s, founded the project in May 2012 in Tokyo, Japan, to create beat-oriented, but symphonic–electronic music focusing on storytelling and cinematic elements.

Soon after the launch, several tracks of the project's early work were used and in media and advertising campaigns, such as Lexus ES 2013/2014 ad campaign, promo trailer of Elysium, and The Paperboy advertising campaign. In December 2012, "Oath (Dubstep Remix)" was licensed and featured in Verizon Wireless TV commercial “Droid DNA -Extra Sensory" with its artwork, which was aired across the U.S. Along with the campaign, Verizon Wireless distributed the ringtone and ringback tone versions of the track.

In May 2013, the project's first nine tracks including "Fate", "Judgment Day", "Fire Back", "Requiem for an Angel" were publicly released.

In September 2013, Oe relocated from Tokyo to New York City, United States.

== First Album (2014–2016) ==
In May 2014, his label Model Electronic released the self-titled debut album of Dark Model in the form of CD and digital downloads. The album has 16 tracks including new tracks such as "Broken Arrows", "Close to Infinity", "Ran (Resistance),” "Moment of Truth", as well as new mixes of "Fate", "Judgment Day", "Oath (Dubstep Remix).” On Bandcamp, "Oath (Original Mix)” was added as a bonus track.

Regarding his first self-titled album, Garret Jutte wrote in the Guardian Liberty Voice that Dark Model "created an album that many different music fans can enjoy. Whether they are attracted to dubstep, classical, EDM, or something else, Dark Model gathers so many different elements and finds a way to combine them into something monumental and dramatic." Under the Gun Review magazine described it as "one of the best electronic music efforts in recent memory and easily one of the most grandiose and memorable of 2014 (score 9.5/10).”

In March 2015, the album was nominated for the 14th Annual Independent Music Awards in the Dance/Electronica Album category.

"Judgment Day", included in this album, has been licensed and featured in a lot of TV programs such as Netflix “Comedians in Cars Getting Coffee: Jimmy Fallon", TV Show "Révolution" (Canada), “Big Knockout Boxing” (DirecTV), and "Hibernation" by State Theatre Company South Australia.

"Broken Arrows" was featured in the 2016 reel of Mr. X Inc, an award-winning visual effects company located in Toronto, Ontario, Canada.

"Judgment Day" got 1.64 million plays on NetEase Cloud Music, a Chinese music streaming service, from May 2020 until Aug 2021. As of December 2023, the total amount reached 4.2 million.

"Abandoned", also included in this album, was licensed and used in an advertising campaign of Tom Ford's "Soleil Neige" in 2021.

== Saga "Unleash Your Inner Hero" (2017) ==
In Jan 2017, Oe announced that Dark Model's second album Saga would be released on March 24, 2017. With this album, Oe emphasized conceptual aspects of the project and named the tag line of the album as "Unleash Your Inner Hero". In addition to the original release in the U.S., and the album was licensed and released in Japan by a Japanese label Music Mine. The Japan edition includes "Oath (Original Mix)” as a bonus track.

In his review of Saga, Johnny Taylor wrote via the Huffington Post, "Listen, if instrumental-video game-techno-orchestral-anime-horror film music is what you dig the most, then this album is perfect. Even if you don’t generally like that, it’s close to perfect. Go get on a treadmill, put on your headphones, and pretend that there is a killer chasing you. This is the soundtrack for it."

Trailer Music News introduced the album, stating, "Featuring a combination of electronic sounds and orchestra, Saga is an energetic and epic album with a good rhythm". Jon C. Ireson on music-news.com (UK) wrote about this album, "If you’re looking for more out of electronic music than five-second loops and bass drops, dig into Dark Model. There’s a whole other universe to explore".

Oath (Original Mix)” was featured on Xbox One “Forza Motorsport 5” campaign video, as well as Lexus ES 2013/2014 ad campaign.

In July 2017, "Oath (Original Mix)” was featured on the trailer of Blizzard Entertainment's online video game Overwatch.

In April 2018, Saga won the 16th Annual Independent Music Award (IMA) for Best Dance/Electronica Album.

== Flashback "Be a Badass" (2019) ==
"Flashback, the third full-album of Dark Model, is a collection of 15 orchestral electronic tracks including new mixes of its early works. "Fire Back", included in this album, was featured in the "Paperboy" TV spot and Northern Ballet's choreography "Brief Landing feat. Kevin Poeung". A couple of tracks from this album, such as "Tougher Than Steel" and ”No Surrender", were used in History Channel's “Forged in Fire.”

== Driving Orchestral Electro Mix "Dance to the Epic Music" (2020) ==
Model Electronic Records digitally released "Driving Orchestral Electro Mix“ in October 2020, which focused on the danceable side of Dark Model's music. It collects groovy and dramatic orchestral electro dance tracks (new songs and remixes) and a continuous mix produced by Oe.

== Odyssey "Immerse yourself into the musical spectacles" (2022) ==
Odyssey is a scaled-up version of the 2017 release "Saga" in its epic and cinematic electronic music, while it features more choir sounds than any previous album. This album has two editions, the full-album and "Instrumental Edition".

In the 2022 album "Impulse," Oe leaned toward a more contemporary and futuristic soundscape while setting itself apart from its conventional classical and apocalyptic style. In contrast to "Impulse," the 2023 release "Relentless," true to its title, features relentlessly powerful tracks that weave a highly dramatic story.

== Discography ==
=== Full albums ===
- Dark Model (2014; Model Electronic)
- Saga (2017; Model Electronic)
- Flashback (2019; Model Electronic)
- Odyssey (2022; Model Electronic)
- Odyssey (Instrumental Edition) (2022; Model Electronic)
- Impulse (2022; Model Electronic)
- Relentless (2023; Model Electronic)

=== Mini album ===
- Yami (2013; via Bandcamp) – Dark Model's early work.

=== Singles ===
- Rage and Redemption (2015)
- Oath (2017)

=== Compilation album ===
- Driving Orchestral Electro Mix (2020; Model Electronic)

== Awards and nominations ==
Independent Music Awards

| Year | Nominee / work | Award | Result |
|---|---|---|---|
| 2015 | Dark Model | Best Dance / Electronica Album | Nominated |
| 2018 | Saga | Best Dance / Electronica Album | Won |
