= Trainwreck (band) =

Bangladeshi heavy metal band

- Origin: Dhaka, Bangladesh
- Genres: Heavy metal music
- Years active: 2007-present
- Members: Abir Ahmed, A.K. Rahul, Ekram Wasi, Habibullah Farhan, Minhaj Ahmed

Trainwreck is a Bangladeshi heavy metal band, founded in 2007.

== History ==
The band was formed in Dhaka, Bangladesh in 2007, but started actively performing shows from 2009 onwards. In 2019, Trainwreck won the Bangalore Open Air 2019 against 77 other bands, and were awarded a slot at the Wacken Open Air in Germany later that year. The band also won the Global Metal Apocalypse award in 2019. In 2020, the band released their fourth single, and have plans to extend touring.

== Band members ==
- Abir Ahmed Shuvo - vocals
- A K Rahul - guitar
- Ekram Wasi - guitar
- Habibullah Farhan - bass
- Minhaj Ahmed Mridul - drums
