= Costel Busuioc =

Romanian tenor

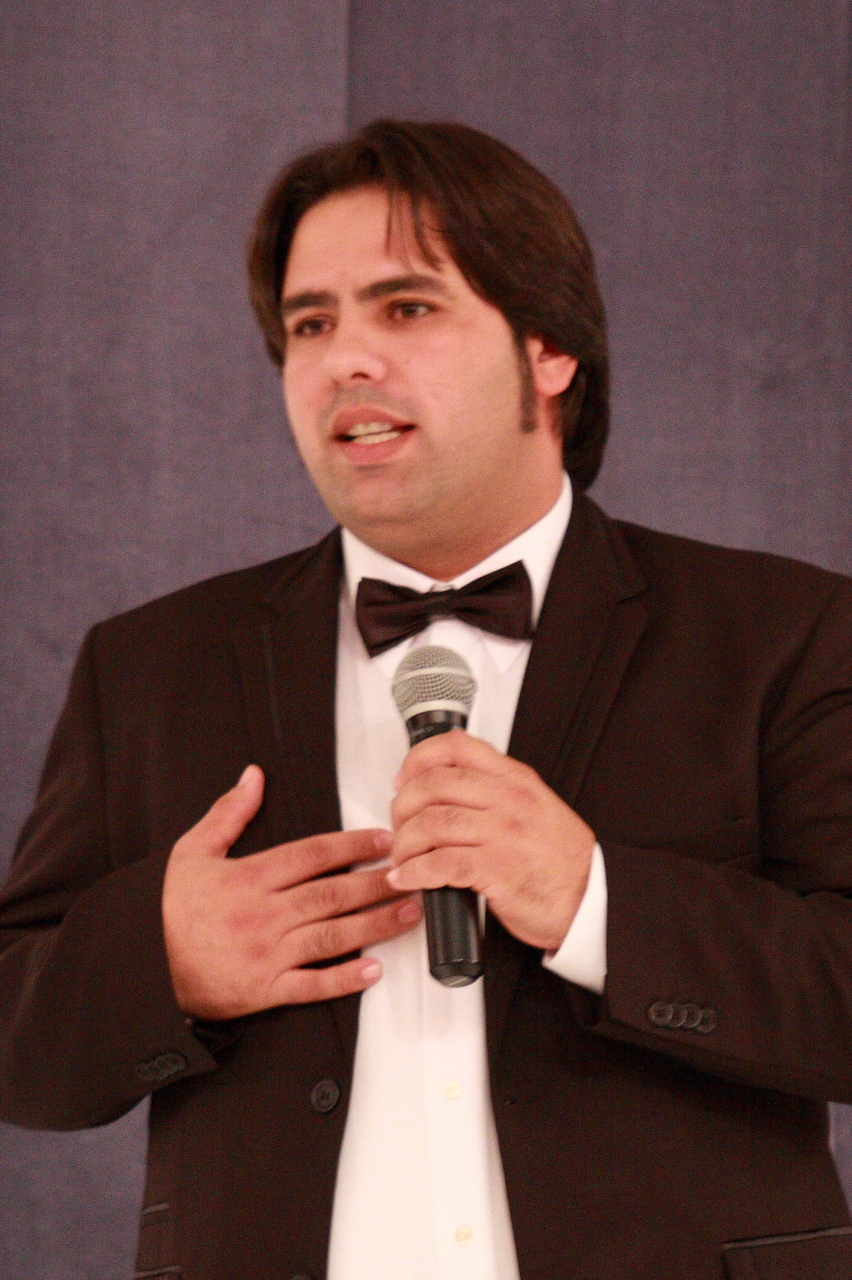
- Costel Busuioc in November 2009

Background information
- Born: 21 October 1974 (age 51); Tomești, Iași, Romania
- Occupation: Singer
- Years active: 2008 – present
- Labels: Sony BMG

Costel Busuioc (born 21 October 1974, Goruni, Tomeşti, Iaşi) is a Romanian tenor.

== Background ==
Starting as a poor worker and shepherd, Busuioc settled down in Madrid, Spain in 2006, where he started working as a bricklayer in order to support his family back home. Busuioc has sung opera arias and Christian music since he was a teenager; he used to be a cantor in several Transylvanian churches.

== Hijos de Babel ==
While in Spain, a friend insisted that he take part in an audition for the local immigrant-oriented talent contest called Hijos de Babel (sp. "Babel's children"). Of the 4,000 people who had initially signed up for the contest, Busuioc was pronounced the winner on 13 March 2008, after passing a tie-break stage the same day – he first sang the air Libiamo ne' lieti calici from Traviata by Verdi and then Puccini's Nessun dorma (from the opera Turandot), which won him the contest. The offered prize brought Busuioc a contract with Sony BMG; it was stated that the record label would arrange for Busuioc's family to move to Madrid.

== Instruction and capabilities ==
The story of Busuioc had a large impact back in Romania. Busuioc actually had music lessons in Timișoara for three years, but his schedule was so tiresome that he could hardly find the time to practice.

Busuioc was nicknamed the "Pavarotti of the Carpathians" for his vocal capabilities, given that his formal training is minimal. The songs and arias he chose to sing during the Hijos de Babel contest demanded a tenor B (only a semitone below the tenor C) several times.
