= Mafia Honey =

Finnish pop/rock band

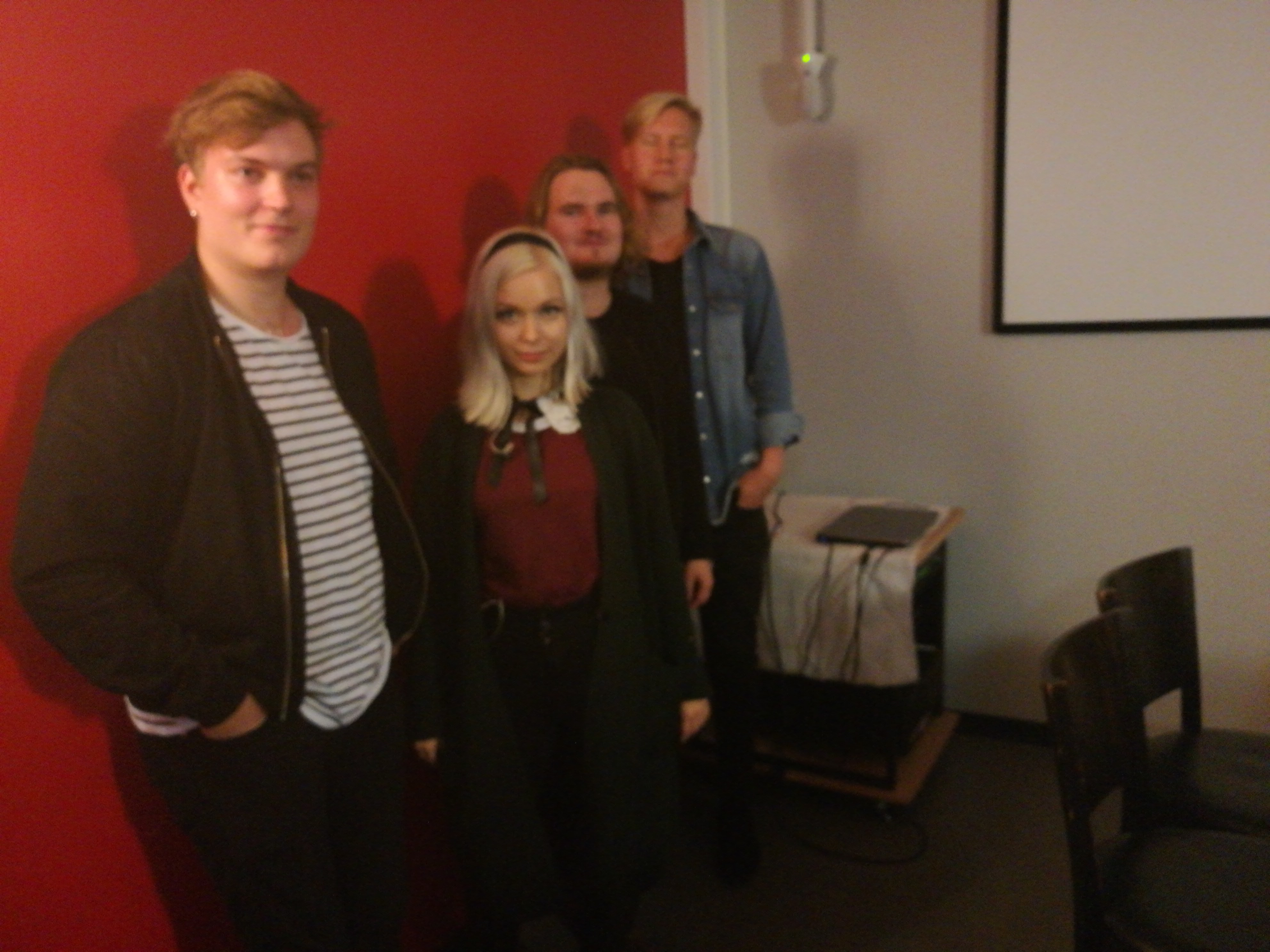
- Mafia Honey in 2019, from left to right: Tomas Niemistö, Salla-Marja Hätinen, Ilkka Tuovinen, Johannes Erkkilä

Background information
- Origin: Helsinki, Finland
- Genre: Pop-rock
- Years active: 2016 – present
- Label: Sony Music Finland
- Members: Salla-Marja Hätinen; Tomas Niemistö; Ilkka Tuovinen; Johannes Erkkilä
- Website: https://www.hogmusic.fi/artistit/mafia-honey/ (in Finnish)

Mafia Honey is a Finnish pop-rock band formed in 2016 in Helsinki by the former vocalist of the defunct band Sallan ja Miron matka maailman ympäri, signed by the local branch of Sony Music. The band released its self-titled debut solo album in 2019 and several singles from it, all the songs were written by Salla-Marja Hätinen.

== History ==
The band’s beginning dates back to 2015, when Salla-Marja Hätinen made several demos, which became interested to Sony Music. Then, through social circles, she began to look for “nice guys” who would form a band led by her. So the lineup included guitarist Tomas Niemistö, who had previously played in the ensemble of the Finnish pop star Robin Packalen, bassist Ilkka Tuovinen, and drummer Johannes Erkkilä.

The debut single “Rakastutaan” (Finnish: Let’s Fall in Love) was released on January 19, 2018. The second one “Koira” (Finnish: Dog) came out on June 1, 2018. The last single from the first album “Yhdeksän elämää” (Finnish: Nine Lives) was released on January 4, 2019, and, according to the singer of the group Salla-Marja Hätinen, this track for the album was intentionally recorded last, and the reason for this was the desire to achieve “the best understanding within the band” before recording it.

== The band’s name ==
The band got its name from one of Marilyn Monroe’s dogs. “Maf” was the Maltese lap dog that Frank Sinatra gifted to Marilyn Monroe; in connection with the allegedly mafia ties of Sinatra, the dog was fully baptized “Mafia Honey.” When Monroe died, the dog was given to the secretary of Sinatra.

== Discography ==
=== Albums ===
Name	Release	Charts	Certifications
Name	Release	FIN	Certifications
Mafia Honey	Released: April 26, 2019; Format: CD / digital distribution; Label: Sony Music	-	-

=== Singles ===
Name	Year	Charts	Album
Name	Year	FIN	Album
Koira	2018	-	Mafia Honey
Rakastutaan	2018	71 (radio chart)	Mafia Honey
Yhdeksän elämää	2019	-	Mafia Honey

== Band members ==
- Salla-Marja Hätinen — vocals, kantele (2016—)
- Tomas Niemistö — guitars (2016—)
- Ilkka Tuovinen — bass (2016—)
- Johannes Erkkilä — drums (2016—)
