= Sony BMG =

American record company (2004–2008)

Sony BMG Music Entertainment
- Logo used from 2004 to 2008
- Type: Joint venture
- Industry: Music; Entertainment
- Predecessors: Sony Music Entertainment, Inc. (first incarnation); Bertelsmann Music Group
- Founded: August 6, 2004; 22 years ago
- Defunct: October 1, 2008; 18 years ago
- Fate: Bertelsmann's shares acquired by Sony; Brand reused by Bertelsmann itself as BMG Rights Management
- Successors: Sony Music Entertainment (current incarnation without using "Inc."); BMG Rights Management (spin-off)
- Headquarters: New York City, U.S.
- Area served: Worldwide
- Key people: David Gordon (chairman, Sound & Vision)
- Products: Music
- Owners: Each of 50% owned by: Sony Corporation of America; Bertelsmann
- Website: web.archive.org/web/20060101212743/http://www.sonybmg.com/

Sony BMG Music Entertainment was an American record company owned as a 50–50 joint venture between Sony Corporation of America and Bertelsmann. The venture's successor, the revived Sony Music Entertainment, is wholly owned by Sony Group Corporation, following their buyout of the remaining 50% held by Bertelsmann. BMG was instead rebuilt as BMG Rights Management on the basis of the remaining 200 artists.

== History ==
Sony BMG Music Entertainment began as the result of a merger between Sony Music Entertainment (part of Sony) and Bertelsmann Music Group (part of Bertelsmann) completed on August 6, 2004. It was one of the Big Four music companies and includes ownership and distribution of recording labels such as Arista Records, Columbia Records, Epic Records, J Records, Mchenry Records, Jive Records, RCA Victor Records, RCA Records, Legacy Recordings, Sonic Wave America and others. The merger affected all Sony Music and Bertelsmann Music Group companies worldwide except for Japan, where it was felt that it would reduce competition in that country's music industry significantly.

Financial analysts covering the merger anticipated that up to 2,000 jobs would be cut as a result, saving Sony BMG approximately $350 million annually.

The company's chief executive officer (CEO) was Rolf Schmidt-Holtz, who succeeded Andrew Lack on February 10, 2006. In the first half of 2005, the company's share of new releases in the United States (US) declined from 33% to 26% according to Nielsen SoundScan. This, and Lack's negotiation of what some called an "ill-conceived" deal with Bruce Springsteen led to Bertelsmann informing Sony that it would not renew Lack's contract.

The company signed a content deal with the popular video sharing community YouTube.

On August 5, 2008, Sony Corporation agreed to buy Bertelsmann AG's 50 percent stake in the music company for $1.2 billion to get full control. The music company was renamed Sony Music Entertainment and became a unit of Sony Corporation of America. This allowed Sony the rights to artists on the current and historic BMG roster and allowed Sony Corporation to better integrate its functions with its PlayStation 3 and upcoming new media initiatives. As part of the buyout, Bertelsmann kept the rights to master recordings by 200 artists, which formed the basis for a second version of BMG.

Sony and Bertelsmann last teamed up in 2013, in a failed bid to acquire Parlophone from Universal Music Group. BMG would administer the label's back catalogue, while its current artists would sign with Sony. While Sony BMG failed to win Parlophone (which ultimately went to Warner Music Group), BMG acquired Mute Records' back catalogue and licensed Depeche Mode and the catalogue of The Echo Label to Sony.

== Controversies ==
Epic Records, one of their labels, was specifically cited for using fake contests in order to hide the fact that the gifts were going to disc jockeys rather than listeners.

=== Rootkit scandal ===
On 31 October 2005, a scandal erupted over digital rights management (DRM) software produced and shipped by Sony BMG that automatically installed itself on people's computers and made them more vulnerable to computer viruses. The scandal and attendant controversy about the practice of software auto-installation spawned several lawsuits. Sony BMG eventually recalled all of the affected CDs.

On November 16, 2005, US-CERT, the United States Computer Emergency Readiness Team, part of the United States Department of Homeland Security, issued an advisory on Extended Copy Protection DRM, citing the XCP use of rootkit technology to hide certain files from the computer user as a security threat to computer users, saying that a Sony-provided uninstallation option also introduced computer system vulnerabilities.

US-CERT advised, "Do not install software from sources that you do not expect to contain software, such as an audio CD." In its "Top Flops of '05" issue, the enterprise newsweekly eWeek had to create a new category for the "Sony BMG root-kit fiasco." Peter Coffee of eWeek Labs reported, "The Sony brand name was already in trouble—it lost 16 percent of its value between 2004 and 2005....

Now it has taken a blow among tech-product opinion leaders. "We've never done it before, and we hope we'll never have [an] occasion to do it again but, for 2005, eWeek Labs awards a Stupid Tech Trick grand prize to Sony." eWeek Vol. 22, No.50

=== Kazaa file-sharing lawsuit ===
In October 2007, Sony BMG, alongside other large music firms, successfully sued Jammie Thomas for making 24 songs available for download on the Kazaa file-sharing network. Thomas, who made US$36,000 a year, was ordered to pay US$222,000 in damages. Thomas had allegedly shared 1702 files in total; the court upholding the award called it an "aggravated case of willful infringement".

=== Children's online privacy violations ===
In 2008, the Federal Trade Commission sued Sony BMG for collecting and displaying personal data of 30,000 minors without parental consent via its websites since 2004, violating the Federal Trade Commission Act and the Children's Online Privacy Protection Act. Sony did not restrict minor children's participation in its websites. Sony paid a $1 million fine.

== See also ==
- Sony Music Entertainment
- Bertelsmann Music Group
- Big Four
- Sony Music Entertainment Japan, which was not part of Sony BMG, distributed Japanese music in the US through Columbia or Epic, since around March 2007 when previous distributor, Tofu Records, was closed
- List of record labels
- List of Sony BMG Entertainment artists
- List of Sony Music Entertainment labels
- List of Sony Music Entertainment artists
- Columbia House
