= Fingertight =

American rock band

- Origin: Martinez, California, U.S.
- Genres: Post-grunge; alternative rock; alternative metal; nu metal
- Years active: 1997-2005
- Label: Columbia Records
- Past members: Scott Rose; Sergio Reynoso; Jesse Del Rio; Kirk Shelton; Shayne

Fingertight was an American rock band from Martinez, California. The group released one album on Columbia Records before breaking up in the mid-2000s.

== History ==
Fingertight began as a local group playing in the San Francisco area, and self-released an album which they promoted heavily through internet channels such as mp3.com. Signing with Columbia Records in 2001, the group released its major-label debut, In the Name of Progress, in 2003. The album was produced by Tobias Miller and Bill Appleberry, and the group performed at Lollapalooza following its release. A single from the album, "Guilt (Hold Down)", hit #34 on the US Billboard Mainstream Rock Tracks chart that same year. "Guilt (Hold Down)" was also used for the 2003 racing game, NASCAR Thunder 2004.

The group broke up later in the 2000s, with lead singer Scott Rose moving on to the project Sleep in Fame (and then "This Is War" before going solo) and drummer Kirk Shelton playing with The Few which disbanded and then joined forces with former bassist Jesse on vocals and guitarist Dustin to form another project (Stick Figure Encore). Scott Rose still writes / records solo. Kirk Shelton now plays drums with the punk band Dead Drift.

In 2013, Scott Rose and Amanda Roethlin were arrested after a police officer found various illegal items in their motorhome, including loaded guns, burglary tools, and fake and stolen identification cards. In August 2014, Rose and Roethlin were arrested again after they tried to open a restaurant ATM with a blowtorch.

== Members ==
- Scott Rose – vocals
- Sergio Reynoso – guitar
- Jesse Del Rio – bass
- Kirk Shelton – drums
- Jamie Stevenson – synthesizer
- Shayne – vocals (1997? – 1998)

== Discography ==
- Suburban Hardcore Contemporary (self-released, 1998)
- Meantime Between Failures (self-released, 2000)
- In The Name of Progress (Columbia Records, 2003)
