= Fertig, Los! =

German indie rock band

Fertig, Los! was an indie rock band from Germany. It was formed in the summer of 2004 in Munich. Its members consisted of Julia Viechtl (bassist), Florian Wille (drummer), and Philipp Leu (singer and guitarist). The band split up in 2013.

== Band history ==
The original four musicians knew each other from their school days. The positive reviews of their first demo were included in a Munich city magazine and the musician Marc Liebscher. From the release of their first EP in June 2006 arose a record deal with Columbia Records. Fertig, Los! recorded their debut album at the de:Uphon-Studio in Wilzhofen. With their first single they made it on the German popcharts right away. Their song ‘Sie ist in mich verliebt’ was included in the soundtrack to FIFA 07.

In 2008, Raphael Dwinger left the band to attend drama school to pursue acting. Florian Lüdtke has joined the band as a live guitarist.

== Breakup ==
Fertig, Los! announced their breakup on May 8, 2013 via Facebook and Twitter messages, explaining that the reason they were splitting up was because they were all in separate parts of Europe and that it would be difficult to continue with the band. Along with the messages, the band posted a link to a new music video they made while in Iraq. The music video featured the song ‘Die Anderen’.

One of the messages read:

Ihr Lieben, Leider müssen wir euch mitteilen, dass wir uns entschlossen haben musikalisch nunmehr getrennte Wege zu gehen. Es war eine wundervolle Zeit und es fällt uns weiß Gott nicht leicht Adieu zu sagen. Aber unsere kleine Band am Leben zu halten, während wir über ganz Europa verteilt sind, ist uns unmöglich geworden. Zum traurigen Anlass haben wir hier noch ein Musikvideo zu "Die Anderen", das auf unserer Irakreise entstanden ist. Wir danken euch allen, die in den acht Jahren Fertig, Los! vor und hinter der Bühne zu uns standen. Wir danken euch von ganzem Herzen, haben euch darin eingeschlossen und den Schlüssel weggeworfen. Was unsere Zukunft bereit hält können wir im Moment nicht sagen - weil wir es nicht wissen. Sobald sich das ändert erfahrt ihr es als Erste.

Alles Gute, Julia, Flo, Simon und Philipp

== Discography ==
=== Albums ===
- 2007 - Das Herz ist ein Sammler (Limited Edition [Digipak])
- 2007 - Das Herz ist ein Sammler(Standard Edition)
- 2010 - Pläne für die Zukunft

=== EPs ===
- 2006 - Den Westwind ernenn’ ich zu meinem Friseur

=== Singles ===
Das Herz ist ein Sammler:

- 2007 - Ein Geheimnis (Pur Edition)
- 2007 - Sie ist in mich verliebt (Premium Edition)
- 2007 - Sie ist in mich verliebt (Pur Edition)
- 2007 - Links, rechts, links (Pur Edition)
- 2007 - Ich weiß nicht wie das ist (Pur edition)
- 2007 - Erst parallel (Pur Edition)
- 2007 - Ich kann dich hören (Pur Edition)
