= Wilderness Road (band) =

- Origin: Chicago, Illinois, USA
- Genres: Rock
- Years active: 1968–1973 reunited briefly in 1988

Wilderness Road was a rock band founded in 1968 by musicians Warren Leming, Nate Herman, and relatives Andy and Tom Haban. The group, which performed an elaborate stage show, drew on American folklore, and was active in the Anti-War, and Peace Movements of the late 1960s and early 1970s central to Chicago's counterculture movement of the period.

Wilderness Road released two albums, Wilderness Road and Sold for the Prevention of Disease Only, and the group was originally formed to raise money for the Chicago Seven. The band also held staged events in the early 1970s such as the "Passover-Easter Spectacular" and "The Last Brunch", and also made commercials for places like "Spinoza's Torah Center".

== Members ==
- Warren Leming
- Nate Herman
- Andy Haban
- Tom Haban

=== Past sidemen ===
Lou Henslee, Doug Kassel, Louis Ross, Bob Hoban (now with Rodney Carrington), Stuart Klawans (the Nation's film critic), Rawl Hardman, and Ric Mann all performed with the Road:

== Discography ==
- Wilderness Road (1972, Columbia Records)
- Sold for the Prevention of Disease Only (1973, Warner Reprise - also known as For Prevention Only)

== Press/literature ==
Critiques of the band's performance and history are to be found in Rolling Stone (Paul Nelson), Chicago Tribune (Lynn Van Matre, Bruce Vilanch, Dick Cheverton), Chicago Daily News (Jack Haffercamp), Playboy Magazine (David Standish), Creem (Dave Marsh), Chicago Seed (Eliot Wald, Abe Peck), Music Magazine, Variety, Billboard, East Village Other (Robert Rudnick), and the many "underground" papers of the period. Band member Warren Leming published a comic book "Snuk Comics", which featured the work of Leming and fellow band member Nate Herman, illustrated by underground comic legend Skip Williamson. The comic has since become a widely sought-after collector's item. Leming also wrote a series of essays, songs, and a play Cold Chicago, which has been published by Charles H.Kerr, the oldest surviving radical press in the United States.
