= Saiful =

Saiful is a given name. Notable people with the name include:

- Saiful Alom, Bengali politician
- Saiful Apek (born 1969), Malaysian actor and comedian
- Saiful Azam (born 1941), Pakistan Air Force officer
- Saiful Haq, Bangladeshi architect, educator, architectural theorist and activist
- Saiful Hoque, Bangladeshi diplomat, Ambassador of Bangladesh to Russia
- Saiful Islam (disambiguation), several people
- Mohd Saiful Nizam Miswan (born 1981), Malaysian footballer
- Saiful Rijal, the eighth sultan of Brunei
- Mohd Saiful Rusly (born 1978), Malaysian footballer
- Saiful Amar Sudar, Malaysian footballer
- Saiful Bukhari Azlan, Malaysian political worker and politician
- Saiful Bari Titu, football coach and player from Bangladesh
- Saiful (footballer), Indonesian footballer

== See also ==
- Sultan Saiful Rijal Technical College (MTSSR), a technical college in Bandar Seri Begawan, Brunei
- Prince Saiful Malook and Badri Jamala, classic fable from the Hazara region of Pakistan
- Lake Saiful Muluk, an alpine lake at the northern end of the Kaghan Valley near the town of Naran
- Saiful Muluk National Park in the Kaghan Valley in Mansehra District of Khyber-Pakhtunkhwa, in northern Pakistan
- Saifu (c.577), king of Axum
- Saifullah (disambiguation)
