= Radiopilot =

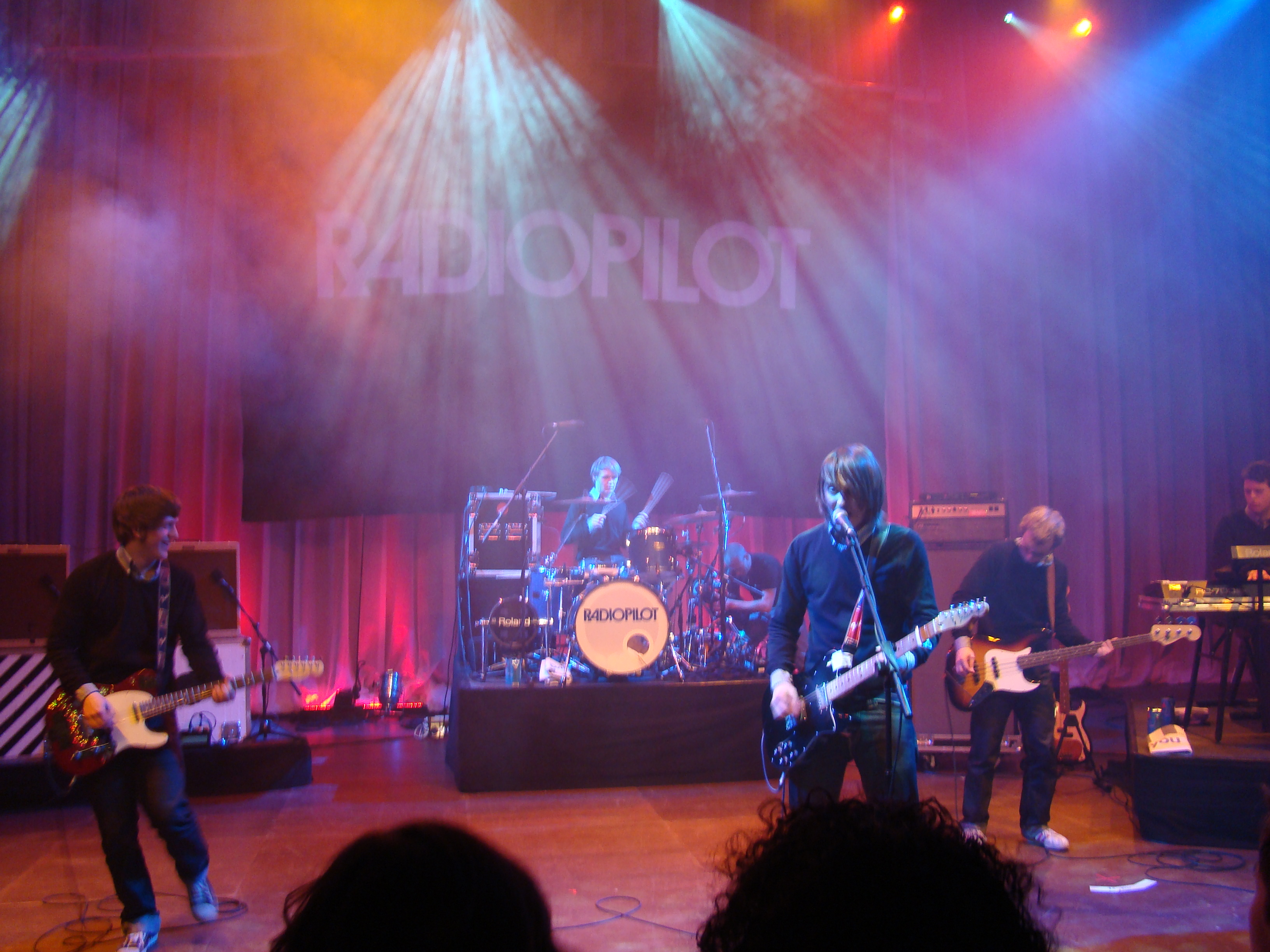
- Radiopilot at the iTunes Festival in Berlin

Background information
- Origin: Germany
- Genres: Indie rock, Indie pop
- Years active: 2005–2013, 2023-
- Labels: Columbia Records
- Members: Lukas Pizone (Guitar/Vocals); Rafael Triebel (guitar); Benjamin Steinke (bass); Christoph Hengelhaupt (drums); Florian Büttner (keyboard)
- Website: www.radiopilot.de

Radiopilot was a German indie rock band from Berlin.

== Background ==
Formed in 2005 under the name 'Kimono', the band won numerous awards, including the John Lennon Talent Award, and award for pop and rock newcomers in Germany. In 2006, the band changed their name. Their first album, Leben passiert (life happens), was released in 2008 on the Columbia label. The group toured as the opening group for Juli in November 2007 before touring with Moneybrother. Their song "Fahrrad" was featured on the soundtrack for FIFA 09.

"Immer wenn wir träumen" had its debut on May 25, 2009, at German music channel VIVA in the show "NEU" ("NEW"). To improve their chances on the market the video was shot with another version of the song as released on their album Leben passiert.

Since 2010 they have been offering a free song every month on their homepage. With January the first download is called "Lieder über Liebe sind out" ("Songs about love are out").

After having been inactive for a longer time, they officially announced their break-up in June 2013. In November 2023, ten years after their breakup, the band re-released on Spotify the single Keine Panik, originally released on 2010. In May 2024, the band released the single Halten.

== Discography ==
=== Singles ===
Year	Title	Chart Positions
Year	Title	GER
2008	Fahrrad (Download only)	-
2008	Monster	82
2009	Immer wenn wir träumen	TBR

=== Albums ===
Year	Title	Chart Positions
Year	Title	GER
2008	Leben passiert	70

=== Others ===
Year	Title	Chart Positions
Year	Title	GER
2007	EP 1.21 Gigawatt Demo	-
2008	EP iTunes Live: Berlin Festival	-
2008	Post #1 (Themesong for Perry Rhodan)	-
