= Brooke Barrettsmith =

American singer-songwriter

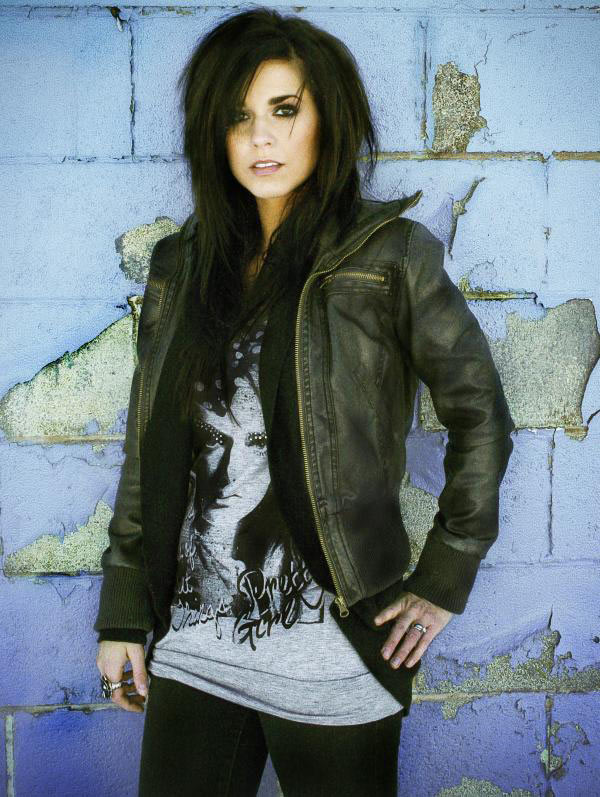
- Promotional Photo, 2010

Background information
- Born: Brooke Elizabeth Barrettsmith; January 4, 1982 (age 44); Chicago, Illinois, United States
- Genres: Rock, pop
- Occupation: Singer-songwriter
- Instruments: Guitar, piano
- Years active: 2000–2012
- Label: Essential Records

Brooke Barrettsmith is a singer, songwriter, and musician originally from Spring Grove, Illinois. She was a former contestant of the reality television show American Idol during its 5th season in 2005–2006.

== Biography ==
Early in Brooke's career (2003–2004), she signed a developmental record deal with Word/Curb/Warner Records as duo act with her younger sister Leah. Then in 2005, auditioning alongside her sister, Brooke reached the top 40 on American Idol. In 2006, Brooke signed a solo recording deal with Sony BMG Records in Nashville, Tennessee and toured nationally with various bands and musicians.

Her self-titled debut album was released on August 19, 2008, to rave reviews. It was produced by Aaron Sprinkle and Rob Hawkins for Essential Records, a Christian subsidiary of Sony BMG Records. Her music charted on Billboard's Top Christian Albums chart and Billboard's Heatseekers Albums chart in September 2008. She was endorsed by Fender Guitars and Taylor Guitars.

In the summer of 2010, she headlined a national tour.

From 2011 to 2012 she was the lead singer for the Chicago-based rock band Vialyne.

She retired from music in 2012.

== Discography ==
- 2003: Open Arms (independent) – as "Two 4 One"
- 2004: Brooke & Leah EP (Word Records, independent) – as "Brooke & Leah"
- 2008: Brooke Barrettsmith (Essential Records) – as "Brooke Barrettsmith"
- 2011: Vialyne EP (independent) – as "Vialyne"

=== Singles ===
- "Farewell"
- "More Real"
- "OK"
- "Quiet My Heart"
- "Beautiful Liar"
