= 3rd Faze =

American pop band

- Origin: Orlando, Florida
- Genres: Pop, teen pop, R&B
- Years active: 2000–2003
- Past members: Sara Marie Rauch; Minia Corominas; Halie Clark

3rd Faze was an all-girl pop trio formed by HealthSouth Corporation and its former chairman and chief executive officer Richard M. Scrushy to perform on HealthSouth's Go For It! Roadshow, a touring show produced by the company.

== History ==
3rd Faze, made up of Halie Clark, Minia Corominas and Sara Marie Rauch, was created in September 2000. On April 27, 2001, the trio signed a performance and recording contract with GFI Productions, the HealthSouth subsidiary which produced the Go For It! Roadshow. RDR Worth Music Publishing, a limited liability corporation formed by Scrushy, Don Perry and Ralph Stringer, acted as go-between. On September 25, 2001, 3rd Faze released their self-titled album on the Edeltone label. The album did not chart and as a result failed commercially.

The band was signed to the Sony-owned Columbia label in 2002 after Sony Records CEO Tommy Mottola was granted 250,000 shares in HealthSouth stock options by the company's board of directors. In 2002 Scrushy assigned HealthSouth Vice-President for Marketing and Communications and former actor Jason Hervey to manage the group. That summer 3rd Faze opened for O-Town and Britney Spears on tour. They recorded four songs for Columbia produced by Rick Wake. Mottola's resignation from Sony led to the cancellation of the record deal.

By March 2003, the group had disbanded.

== Past members ==
- Sara Marie Rauch (2000–2003)
- Minia Corominas (2000–2003)
- Halie Clark (2000–2003)

== Discography ==
=== Studio album ===
- 3rd Faze (2001)

=== EP ===
- 3rd Faze (2001) (Promo)

=== Single ===
- "Shy" (2001)
