= The Remix Master =

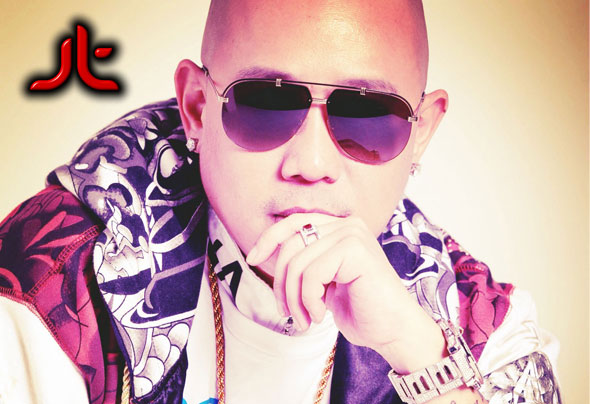

Background information
- Also known as: DJ JT, The Blizzard, 2B1, WMN, Apex
- Born: Jackson Tan; February 14, 1975 (age 51); Singapore
- Genres: Electronic music, House music, Progressive house, Trance, Hip hop
- Occupations: Disc jockey record producer
- Years active: 2004–present
- Labels: Sony Music; Columbia Records; Universal Republic; Capitol Records
- Website: www.sonymusic.co.uk

Jackson Tan (born February 14, 1975) better known by his stage name The Remix Master is a musician, DJ and producer. He is also known as DJ JT, The Blizzard, 2B1, WMN and Apex. His works are notable for integrating trance, electro, dubstep, techno, hip hop with electronic music sounds and world music genres. JT composes his own beats, dance and trance tracks which frequently feature a prominent bass line He has appeared alongside artists including Michael Procter, Akon, Pitbull, Lil Jon, Loren Taylor, Lil Wayne, Wendy Lewis, The Bliz, Ne-Yo, Jason D, Britney Spears, Chris Brown, Whitney Houston, Foxes, Christina Milian, and Ellie Goulding.

In 2012, The Remix Master a.k.a. DJ JT launched a website in an attempt to bring electronic dance music from the underground scene to more mainstream audiences.

== Musical career ==
Jackson Tan began DJing at 18 when he started playing the turntables at home with his homemade mixer. He has now spun as a DJ in Singapore, England, Thailand, US, Belgium, France, Indonesia, South Korea, Japan and is now the resident DJ at Swurv Radio in Las Vegas, Nevada in America.

In April 2012, DJ JT a.k.a. "The Remix Master" joined the line up of American internet radio station Swurv Radio and London based radio station Global Radio One. DJ JT hosts the show Hellion Nights weekly which is also available on podcast via iTunes.

In November 2012, DJ JT closed the gap between Asia and Western EDM with starting his own record label.

In December 2012, Moe Ibrahim, director of Mozaic Hotels and Resorts invited DJ JT to host a Christmas event retreat at their Baan Yin Dee Resort in Phuket, Thailand.

== Radio appearances ==
In 2012, DJ JT joined the line up at American internet radio station Swurv Radio and London based radio station Global Radio One. DJ JT anchors the Saturday night show "Hellion Nights" on Global Radio One UK and he also anchors the Sunday night show on Swurv Radio.

== Discography ==
- Michael Procter – The Way – My Chain (2008)
- Pressure Up – Triball Recordings (2009)
- DJ JT – Call Me Retro Re-Invented – Interscope Records (2009)
- DJ JT – Heart Prison – Smilax Rec (2010)
- Akon, Pitbull & Lil Jon The Remix Master – Sexy Hotel – Interscope Records (2010)
- Loren Taylor The Remix Master - Summer Pearl – Smilax Rec (2010)
- DJ JT – Lady Gaga – Poker Face Official Remix – Kon Live Distribution (2009)
- The Remix Master Ft. Lil Wayne – Lollipop (Like me Remix) – Young Money Entertainment (2009)
- The Remix Master Lady Gaga – Telephone Official Remix – Streamline Records (2010)
- DJ JT Ft. Marco Laschi & Wendy Lewis – Chic – Smilax Rec (2011)
- DJ JT – Mohan – Hope – Radio Record (2011)
- DJ JT – Lost – Lazy Boy Records (2011)
- DJ JT – Sweet Dreams – XL Recording (2012)
- DJ JT Ft. The Bliz – Against All Odds – Digital Play Record (2011)
- DJ JT – Ultimate Mashdown 2011 – Def Jam Recordings (2011)
- DJ JT – The Year Rebeat – Island Records (2011)
- DJ JT Ft. Pitbull, Ne-Yo, Jason D & Britney Spears – Everything's in My Head Official Remix – Interscope Records (2011)
- DJ JT – Tokyo (2012)
- DJ JT – 8ight – Island Records (2012)
- DJ JT – Love Song – Qosh Records (2012)
- DJ JT – Shangri-la – Subtronic Records (2012)
- DJ JT – Moon – Subtronic Records (2012)
- DJ JT – Love Song 2012 – Qosh Records (2012)
- DJ JT – Moments – WMN Records (2012)
- DJ JT – Scared To Love Again – RCA Records (2012)
- DJ JT – Yearn – WMN Records (2012)
- DJ JT – Swoon – WMN Records (2012)
- DJ JT Ft. Ne-Yo – Let's Go(Remix) – Columbia Records (2012)
- The Remix Master Ft. Chris Brown – Don't Judge Me(Remix) – RCA Records (2013)
- DJ JT Ft. Whitney Houston – I Wanna Dance With Somebody – PryMe Records (2013)
- The Remix Master – Zedd Ft. Foxes – Clarity DJ JT Remix – Interscope Records (2013)
- DJ JT – Stafford Brothers Ft. Lil Wayne & Christina Milian – Hello (DJ JT Remix) – Cash Money Records (2013)
- DJ JT – Calvin Harris ft. Ellie Goulding – I Need Your Love (DJ JT Remix) – Columbia Records (2013)
- DJ JT Ft. Nastalim – Concrete Angel – Columbia Records (2013)
- DJ JT – Forever – Its Not A Label (2013)
- DJ JT – Conflict – Its Not A Label (2013)
- DJ JT Ft. Cierra Price – Everything I Do – Its Not A Label (2013)
- Make Live Ft. DJ JT – Medallion – Columbia Records (2013)
- DJ JT Ft. Make Live – Fire Rain – Island Records
- DJ JT – Dance (Original Mix) – Columbia Records (2013)
- Kinzel Ft. DJ JT – Silence (Original Mix) – Columbia Records (2013)
- Kinzel Ft. DJ JT – Change (Original Mix) – Columbia Records (2013)
