= Survivor discography =

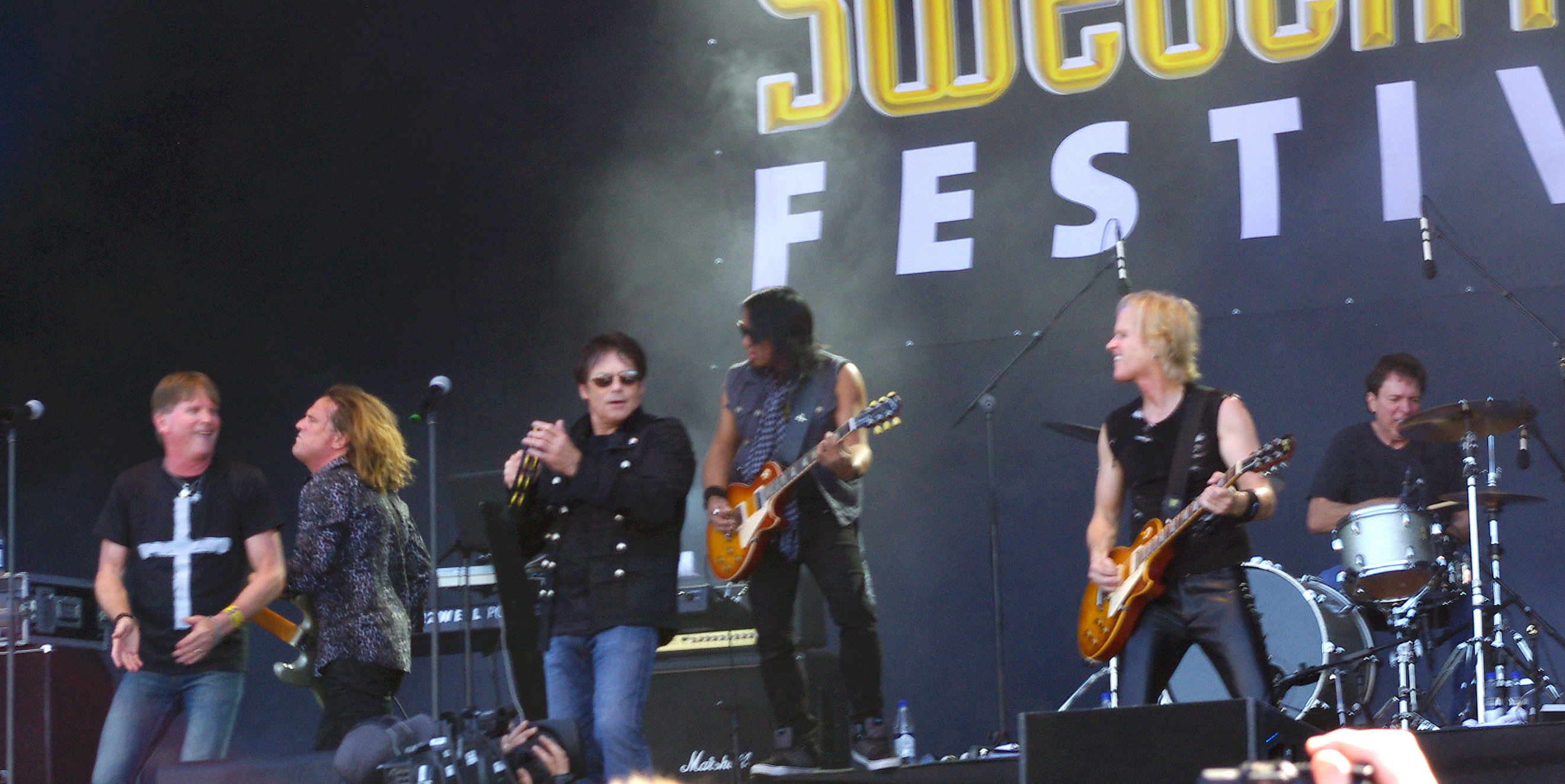
- Survivor performing in Sweden in 2013
- Studio albums: 8
- Live albums: 1
- Compilation albums: 17
- Singles: 24
- Video albums: 2

This is the discography of American rock band Survivor. Their discography consists of 8 studio albums 1 live album 17 compilation albums 24 singles and 2 video albums. Formed in 1978, Survivor released their debut self titled album in 1979 which debuted at 169 on the Billboard 200. This was followed by Premonition which was released in 1981 and peaked at number 82 on the Billboard 200. Just one year later in 1982 they released their hit album Eye of the Tiger which peaked at number 2 on the Billboard 200 and charted in the top 40 in 8 other countries. This album also produced the title track "Eye of the Tiger" which reached number one on the Billboard Hot 100 and also topped the charts in Australia, Canada and the UK. In 1983 they won a Grammy Award for Best Rock Performance by a Duo or Group with Vocal for the song. Eye of the Tiger was group's highest-charting album and has since been certified platinum by the RIAA.

Survivor followed this up with their 4th studio album Caught in the Game which was released in 1983, commercially it did not come anywhere close to the performance of their previous effort but sit peaked at number 82 on the Billboard 200. The following year in 1984 they released Vital Signs which peaked at number 16 on the Billboard 200 and featured the hit singles “High on You” which peaked number 4 on the Billboard Hot 100 and “The Search Is Over" which charted even higher peaking at number 4 while also reaching number 1 on the US Adult Contemporary chart. The album has been certified platinum by the RIAA. That same year they released the song “Burning Heart” which was featured on the Rocky IV soundtrack. The track reached number 2 on the Billboard hot 100 and topped the charts in Belgium and Switzerland.

In 1986 they released their first video album Live in Japan, along with their 6th album When Seconds Count which debuted at number 49 on the Billboard 200. It featured the single “Is This Love” which peaked at number 9 on the Billboard Hot 100. In 1988 they released Too Hot to Sleep which debuted at number 187 on the Billboard 200, while also charting in the top 100 in 4 other countries, the band then broke up following the album's release.

In 1993 they released their second video album Greatest Hits – The Video Collection, then in 2004 they re released Live in Japan now with the title Extended Versions – The Encore Collection. Then following an 18-year hiatus including multiple lineup changes the band released their 8th and final album Reach in 2006.

== Albums ==
=== Studio albums ===
Title	Release	Peak chart positions										Certifications
Title	Release	US	AUS	CAN	GER	NLD	NOR	JPN	SWE	SWI	UK	Certifications
Survivor	Released: December 1979; Label: Scotti Brothers; Formats: LP, MC	169	—	—	—	—	—	—	—	—	—	
Premonition	Released: October 1981; Label: Scotti Brothers; Formats: LP, MC	82	—	—	—	—	—	—	—	—	—	
Eye of the Tiger	Released: June 1982; Label: Scotti Brothers; Formats: LP, MC, 8-track	2	26	4	31	29	3	17	13	—	12	RIAA: Platinum; ARIA: Platinum; MC: Platinum
Caught in the Game	Released: September 1983; Label: Scotti Brothers; Formats: LP, MC, 8-track	82	—	—	63	—	—	—	—	—	—	
Vital Signs	Released: September 1984; Label: Scotti Brothers; Formats: CD, LP, MC	16	—	85	—	—	—	—	48	27	—	RIAA: Platinum; MC: Gold
When Seconds Count	Released: October 1986; Label: Scotti Brothers; Formats: CD, LP, MC	49	—	—	—	—	—	68	30	—	—	
Too Hot to Sleep	Released: October 1988; Label: Scotti Brothers; Formats: CD, LP, MC	187	—	—	55	—	—	82	48	23	—	
Reach	Released: April 25, 2006; Label: Frontiers; Formats: CD, digital download	—	—	—	—	—	—	—	—	—	—	
"—" denotes releases that did not chart or were not released in that territory.

=== Live albums ===
Title	Release
Extended Versions – The Encore Collection	Released: August 3, 2004; Label: BMG; Formats: CD; Re-released with an additional two tracks in 2009 in Japan as Live in Japan 1985

=== Compilation albums ===
Title	Album details	Peak chart positions
Title	Album details	JPN
The Best of Survivor	Released: 1984; Label: Scotti Brothers; Formats: LP, MC; Japan and South Korea-only release	—
The Best Collection of Survivor	Released: June 21, 1986; Label: Scotti Brothers; Formats: CD, LP, MC; Japan-only release	69
The Very Best of Survivor	Released: September 1986; Label: Scotti Brothers; Formats: CD, LP, MC; Germany-only release	—
Greatest Hits	Released: November 1989; Label: Scotti Brothers; Formats: CD, LP, MC	—
Greatest Hits	Released: June 22, 1993; Label: Scotti Brothers; Formats: CD, MC	—
Survivor Collection Volume 1	Released: November 1993; Label: Scotti Brothers; Formats: CD, MC; Split album with solo Jimi Jamison	—
Survivor Collection Volume 2	Released: April 26, 1994; Label: Scotti Brothers; Formats: CD, MC; Split album with solo Jimi Jamison	—
Prime Cuts	Released: October 19, 1998; Label: Spectrum; Formats: CD; UK-only release	—
The Finest Selection ~The Search Is Not Over Yet~	Released: March 17, 1999; Label: Scotti Brothers; Formats: CD, MC; Japan and Philippines-only release	—
Fire in Your Eyes – Greatest Hits	Released: April 24, 2001; Label: Mercury; Formats: CD; Germany-only release	—
Ultimate Survivor	Released: July 13, 2004; Label: Volcano/BMG; Formats: CD, digital download	—
The Best of Survivor	Released: June 6, 2006; Label: Volcano/Legacy; Formats: CD, digital download	—
Playlist – The Very Best Of Survivor	Released: June 30, 2009; Label: Volcano/Legacy; Formats: CD	—
Best of Survivor	Released: July 8, 2009; Label: Sony; Formats: CD; Japan-only release	—
Super Hits	Released: September 14, 2010; Label: Sony Music; Formats: CD	—
The Essential Survivor	Released: October 24, 2014; Label: Sony Music; Formats: digital download	—
The Definitive Collection	Released: July 1, 2016; Label: Real Gone Music/Volcano; Formats: 2xCD	—
"—" denotes releases that did not chart or were not released in that territory.

=== Video albums ===
Title	Release
Live in Japan	Released: January 21, 1986; Label: Pony Video; Formats: LaserDisc, VHS; Japan-only release; Recorded live at Koseinenkin Hall Tokyo on September 21, 1985
Greatest Hits – The Video Collection	Released: 1993; Label: Scotti Brothers; Formats: VHS; Contains ten music videos

== Singles ==
Title	Year	Peak chart positions										Certifications	Album
Title	Year	US	US AC	US Main	AUS	BEL (FL)	CAN	GER	JPN	SWI	UK	Certifications	Album
"Somewhere in America"	1980	70	—	—	—	—	—	—	—	—	—		Survivor
"Rebel Girl"	1980	103	—	—	—	—	—	—	—	—	—		Non-album single
"Summer Nights"	1981	62	—	—	—	—	—	—	—	—	—		Premonition
"Poor Man's Son"	1981	33	—	19	—	—	—	—	—	—	—		Premonition
"Eye of the Tiger"	1982	1	27	1	1	3	1	13	10	6	1	RIAA: 8× Platinum; ARIA: Platinum; BPI: 4× Platinum; BVMI: 2× Platinum; MC: 2× Platinum; RIAJ: Gold; SNEP: Gold	Rocky III soundtrack / Eye of the Tiger
"American Heartbeat"	1982	17	—	—	—	—	—	55	—	—	—		Eye of the Tiger
"The One That Really Matters"	1982	74	—	—	—	—	—	—	—	—	—		Eye of the Tiger
"Caught in the Game"	1983	77	—	16	—	—	—	—	—	—			Caught in the Game
"Slander" (Germany-only release)	1983	—	—	—	—	—	—	—	—	—	—		Caught in the Game
"I Never Stopped Loving You"	1984	104	—	—	—	—	—	—	—	—	—		Caught in the Game
"It Doesn't Have to Be This Way" (Germany-only release)	1984	—	—	—	—	—	—	—	—	—	—		Caught in the Game
"The Moment of Truth"	1984	63	—	—	—	—	—	—	49	—	—		The Karate Kid soundtrack
"I Can't Hold Back"	1984	13	—	1	93	18	19	—	—	—	80		Vital Signs
"High on You"	1985	8	—	8	—	—	35	—	—	—	197		Vital Signs
"The Search Is Over"	1985	4	1	—	60	—	21	—	—	—	143		Vital Signs
"First Night"	1985	53	—	—	—	—	—	—	—	—	—		Vital Signs
"Burning Heart"	1985	2	35	11	55	1	14	17	41	1	5	BPI: Gold; SNEP: Gold	Rocky IV soundtrack
"Is This Love"	1986	9	25	27	—	—	43	—	—	—	—		When Seconds Count
"How Much Love"	1987	51	—	—	—	—	—	—	—	—	—		When Seconds Count
"Man Against the World"	1987	86	—	—	—	—	—	—	—	—	—		When Seconds Count
"In Good Faith" (Germany-only release)	1987	—	—	—	—	—	—	—	—	—	—		When Seconds Count
"Didn't Know It Was Love"	1988	61	—	40	—	—	—	—	—	—	—		Too Hot to Sleep
"Across the Miles"	1989	74	16	—	—	—	—	—	—	—	—		Too Hot to Sleep
"Eye of the Tiger" (2007 re-entry)	2007	—	—	—	—	—	—	—	—	—	47		Eye of the Tiger
"—" denotes a recording that did not chart or was not released in that territory.
