= The Best of Survivor =

Greatest hits album by Survivor
- Released: June 6, 2006
- Recorded: 1981–1988
- Genre: Rock, hard rock
- Length: 56:29
- Label: Volcano/Legacy

Survivor chronology
| Reach (2006) | The Best of Survivor (2006) | Playlist: The Very Best of Survivor (2009) |

Professional ratings
Review scores
| Source | Rating |
|---|---|
| Allmusic | link |

The Best of Survivor is a 2006 compilation album by the American rock band Survivor, containing 14 songs from 1981 to 1988.

== Track listing ==
All tracks are written by Jim Peterik and Frankie Sullivan, except where noted.

| No. | Title | Writer(s) | Original release | Length |
|---|---|---|---|---|
| 1. | "Eye of the Tiger" | | Eye of the Tiger, 1982 | 4:07 |
| 2. | "I Can't Hold Back" | | Vital Signs, 1984 | 3:59 |
| 3. | "High on You" | | Vital Signs | 4:09 |
| 4. | "Poor Man's Son" | | Premonition, 1981 | 3:26 |
| 5. | "The Search Is Over" | | Vital Signs | 4:14 |
| 6. | "American Heartbeat" | | Eye of the Tiger | 4:11 |
| 7. | "Burning Heart" | | Rocky IV: Original Motion Picture Soundtrack, 1985 | 3:51 |
| 8. | "Is This Love" | | When Seconds Count, 1986 | 3:43 |
| 9. | "Ever Since the World Began" | | Eye of the Tiger | 3:43 |
| 10. | "The One That Really Matters" | Peterik | Eye of the Tiger | 3:30 |
| 11. | "Caught in the Game" | | Caught in the Game, 1983 | 4:47 |
| 12. | "The Moment of Truth" | Bill Conti; Dennis Lambert; Peter Beckett | The Karate Kid Soundtrack, 1984 | 3:47 |
| 13. | "Rebel Son" | | When Seconds Count | 4:39 |
| 14. | "Didn't Know It Was Love" | | Too Hot to Sleep, 1988 | 4:23 |
| Total length: | | | | 56:29 |
