= Ultimate Survivor =

Greatest hits album by Survivor
- Released: July 13, 2004
- Recorded: 1979–1988
- Genre: Hard rock; arena rock
- Length: 76:28
- Label: Volcano/Legacy

Survivor chronology
Fire in Your Eyes: Greatest Hits (2001)	Ultimate Survivor (2004)	Extended Versions: The Encore Collection (2004)

Professional ratings
Review scores
Source	Rating
Allmusic	link

Ultimate Survivor is a 2004 compilation album by the American rock band Survivor, containing 18 songs from 1979 to 1988, plus the previously unreleased song "Rockin' into the Night" (which was also recorded by 38 Special in 1980).

== Track listing ==
All tracks are written by Jim Peterik and Frankie Sullivan, except where noted.

No.	Title	Writer(s)	Original release	Length
1.	"Eye of the Tiger"		Eye of the Tiger, 1982	4:09
2.	"Poor Man's Son"		Premonition, 1981	3:27
3.	"I Can't Hold Back"		Vital Signs, 1984	4:00
4.	"Is This Love"		When Seconds Count, 1986	3:44
5.	"The Search Is Over"		Vital Signs	4:13
6.	"Burning Heart"		Rocky IV: Original Motion Picture Soundtrack, 1985	3:51
7.	"First Night"		Vital Signs	4:18
8.	"Across the Miles"		Too Hot to Sleep, 1988	5:52
9.	"High on You"		Vital Signs	4:09
10.	"Man Against the World"	Peterik; Sullivan; Jimi Jamison	When Seconds Count	3:36
11.	"Desperate Dreams"		Too Hot to Sleep	4:50
12.	"American Heartbeat"		Eye of the Tiger	4:11
13.	"Caught in the Game"		Caught in the Game, 1983	4:46
14.	"Didn't Know It Was Love"		Too Hot to Sleep	4:23
15.	"Rebel Girl"	Peterik; Gary Smith	"Rebel Girl" single, 1980	3:51
16.	"Summer Nights" (Full Length Version)		Premonition	4:09
17.	"Somewhere in America"	Peterik	Survivor, 1979	5:13
18.	"Rockin' into the Night"	Peterik; Sullivan; Smith	Previously unreleased, 1979	3:49
Total length:				76:28
