= Greatest Hits (Survivor album) =

Compilation album by Survivor

Greatest hits album by Survivor
- Released: November 1989
- Recorded: 1981–1988 (1989 release); 1979–1992 (1993 release)
- Genre: Hard rock; arena rock
- Length: 39:31 (1989 release); 50:42 (1993 release)
- Label: Scotti Bros.
- Producer: Joe Gastwirt; David Mitson

Survivor chronology
Too Hot to Sleep (1988)	Greatest Hits (1989)	Prime Cuts: Classics Tracks (1998)

Professional ratings
Review scores
Source	Rating
Allmusic	link

Greatest Hits is the title of two compilation albums released by the American rock band Survivor in 1989 and 1993.

The first Survivor Greatest Hits album was released in 1989, after the band went on indefinite hiatus following the commercial failure of their 1988 album Too Hot to Sleep. The album covers 10 of the band's singles from 1981 to 1988.

The package was reissued in 1993 featuring two new songs recorded with original lead vocalist Dave Bickler.

== Track listings ==
=== 1989 release ===
All tracks are written by Jim Peterik and Frankie Sullivan, except where noted.

No.	Title	Writer(s)	Original release	Length
1.	"Eye of the Tiger"		Eye of the Tiger, 1982	4:03
2.	"High on You"		Vital Signs, 1984	4:07
3.	"I Can't Hold Back"		Vital Signs, 1984	3:57
4.	"Is This Love"		When Seconds Count, 1986	3:41
5.	"Poor Man's Son"		Premonition, 1981	3:19
6.	"Burning Heart"		Rocky IV: Original Motion Picture Soundtrack, 1985	3:50
7.	"The Search Is Over"		Vital Signs	4:11
8.	"Desperate Dreams"		Too Hot to Sleep, 1988	4:46
9.	"How Much Love"		When Seconds Count	3:57
10.	"Man Against the World"	Peterik; Sullivan; Jimi Jamison	When Seconds Count	3:34
Total length:				39:31

=== 1993 release ===
No.	Title	Writer(s)	Original release	Length
1.	"Eye of the Tiger"		Eye of the Tiger	4:09
2.	"You Know Who You Are"		New recording	4:51
3.	"Burning Heart"		Rocky IV: Original Motion Picture Soundtrack	3:49
4.	"The Search Is Over"		Vital Signs	4:13
5.	"High on You"		Vital Signs	4:09
6.	"Is This Love"		When Seconds Count	3:42
7.	"I Can't Hold Back"		Vital Signs	3:59
8.	"Hungry Years"	Dave Bickler; Peterik; Sullivan	New recording	5:12
9.	"American Heartbeat"		Eye of the Tiger	4:10
10.	"Poor Man's Son"		Premonition	3:19
11.	"The Moment of Truth"	Bill Conti; Dennis Lambert; Peter Beckett	The Karate Kid Soundtrack, 1984	3:46
12.	"Somewhere in America"	Peterik	Survivor, 1979	5:13
Total length:				50:42

Japanese bonus track
No.	Title	Original release	Length
13.	"Caught in the Game"	Caught in the Game, 1983	4:47
Total length:			55:29
