= Man Against the World =

Single by Survivor

from the album When Seconds Count and Rocky IV (reissue)
- B-side: "Oceans"
- Released: April 1987 (US)
- Recorded: 1986
- Genre: Soft rock
- Length: 3:35
- Label: Scotti Bros.
- Songwriters: Jimi Jamison, Jim Peterik, Frankie Sullivan
- Producer: Ron Nevison

Survivor singles chronology
"How Much Love" (1987)	"Man Against the World" (1987)	"In Good Faith" (1987)

"Man Against the World" is a song by American rock band Survivor. It was the fourth track and the third single released from their 1986 album When Seconds Count. The song was originally to be included on the soundtrack to the 1985 film Rocky IV, but was ultimately cut from the final tracklist. The song did appear as a bonus track on the 2006 reissue of the Rocky IV soundtrack album, along with Survivor's two other Rocky-related singles – the #1 hit "Eye of the Tiger" (the smash hit from Rocky III) and "Burning Heart," which was the song ultimately chosen for the Rocky IV soundtrack and peaked at #2.

In the liner notes to Survivor's Ultimate Survivor compilation, lead singer Jimi Jamison describes how his first take on the demo for the song so pleased producer Ron Nevison that it was left completely intact for the final recording, with Nevison building the remaining instrumentation around the demo vocals.

The B-side of the single, "Oceans" also appeared on the When Seconds Count album as the sixth track.

== Weekly charts ==
Chart (1987)	Peak position
US Billboard Hot 100	86
