= Kyle Woodring =

American drummer

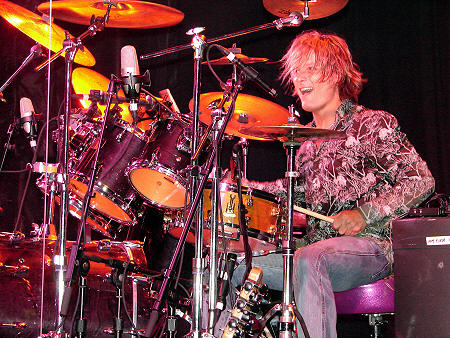

Background information
- Born: February 27, 1967; Mason, Michigan
- Died: September 8, 2009 (aged 42) Lockport, Illinois
- Genres: Rock, hard rock, country
- Occupation: Musician
- Instrument: Drums
- Years active: 1986-2009
- Formerly of: Survivor

Kyle Woodring (February 27, 1967 – September 8, 2009) was an American musician living in the Chicago, Illinois, area. Born and raised in Mason, Michigan. He began playing drums at the age of four, and studied percussion privately for ten years before enrolling in the School of Music at MSU after graduating from high school.

== Career ==
After college, Woodring moved to Chicago, Illinois, with musicians Jan James and Craig Calvert as the percussive force behind the blues/rock band Jewel Fetish. While recording with the band, Kyle was introduced to a number of Chicago area musicians and producers who helped him establish a base in the competitive Chicago music scene, and led to his working and touring with former King Crimson guitarist Adrian Belew, and his band The Bears.

In 1989, Kyle began a stint as the drummer for the Chicago rock band Survivor. He appears in the band's video for "Didn't Know it Was Love" (from the 1988 Too Hot to Sleep album) which was featured on MTV. Kyle also recorded a track for the band's 1993 re-release of their Best of album.

Woodring performed briefly with John Mellencamp in 1996, a project which led him to begin touring and recording for the next eight years with country music star Deana Carter. In addition to Carter, Woodring began performing with Dennis DeYoung, the founder and former frontman for the band Styx. From 2000 to 2009, Woodring was the drummer for DeYoung, who plays concerts with both a five-piece band and, at times, a symphony orchestra. Woodring was featured in the Soundstage production of DeYoung's music, released in 2002. In 2007, DeYoung released a new CD in Quebec, Canada entitled One Hundred Years from Now. The title song went to the #1 spot in the Quebec charts during the summer of 2007. In January 2008, Woodring completed the recording of two additional tracks for the American release of the CD, scheduled for the summer of 2008.

In October 2007, Woodring began a stint as the drummer for the Chicago production of the hit musical Jersey Boys. This show later ended its Chicago run on January 10, 2010.

== Recordings and performances ==
=== Live performances ===
Kyle performed as a drummer with the following artists:

- Deana Carter
- Dennis DeYoung
- George Michael
- John Mellencamp
- Kenny Marks
- Paul Shaffer Band
- Peter Cetera
- Rich Mullins
- Robbie Fulks
- Survivor
- Joan Hammel
- Blanc Faces

=== Studio recordings ===
- Deana Carter - The Story of My Life (2004)
- Deana Carter - The Chain (2007)
- Daniel Barenboim - A Tribute to Duke Ellington
- Kenny Marks - World Gone Mad
- Dennis DeYoung - Live (2004), One Hundred Years from Now (2007)
- Joan Hammel - "joanland"
- Blanc Faces - Blanc Faces (2005), Falling From The Moon (2009)

== Death ==
Woodring died on September 8, 2009, at his home in Lockport, IL as the result of suicide. His brother, Kirk Woodring, posted the following information on Kyle's Facebook page: "Kyle struggled for most of his life with depression. At times his depression overwhelmed him. Despite all he had in his life, he was often unable to recognize his worth to the world. On September 8th he died by suicide. I feel helpless and saddened to not have been able to help Kyle in his last hours. I'm sure many of you share this feeling of guilt. I also know that those truly intent on suicide rarely reach out once they are committed to the act. In fact the decision to act on these thoughts can bring about a sense of peace and calm. Depression is sometimes a terminal illness. I love my brother deeply and know how wonderful his life was. I will celebrate his light and know that the darkness is no longer present for him."

On September 9, 2009, Survivor guitarist Frankie Sullivan wrote on his Facebook page "I am deeply saddened to have learned of the passing of my friend and one time Survivor Drummer Kyle Woodring. He was the best of people and will be dearly missed by all. Godspeed Kyle."

On September 10, 2009 Dennis DeYoung posted a picture of Woodring on his website with a message that read 'A gathering of angels appeared above my head.' In memory of my good friend Kyle Woodring.

Memorial services were held for Woodring in late September, 2009 in East Lansing, Michigan and Chicago, Illinois. Those in attendance ranged from Kyle's childhood friends to many of the musicians he worked with over the years, including Dennis DeYoung, Robbie Fulks, Joan Hammel, Jan James, and others.

In December 2009 his high school classmates established a fund in Woodring's name, which was later used to commission a composition by American composer Brian Balmages. The composition is for symphony and concert bands and is entitled "Backstage Pass," honoring Woodring and his career. The Mason High School Symphonic Band in Mason, Michigan premiered the composition May 17, 2015. The composition combines influences of jazz, theatrical and ambient music. According to Balmages, the composition "was one of the most challenging and gratifying for me as a composer. I really hoped to capture Kyle's life and musical influence." Balmages states that he drew from a musical theme that runs throughout Kyle's CD, "A Child's Gift" which is available on iTunes.
