= Real Men of Genius =

Series of Bud Light advertisements

- Agency: DDB Chicago
- Client: Anheuser-Busch
- Language: English
- Media: radio, TV
- Running time: 60″ (US radio and UK TV); 30″ (US TV)
- Product: Bud Light (US) Budweiser (UK)
- Release dates: 1998 (US radio); 2001 (UK TV); 2003 (US TV)
- Directed by: Tom Schiller, Tom Kuntz & Mike Maguire, Noam Murro, Greg Popp & John Immesoete
- Music by: Sam Stryke & Sandy Torano, Scandal Music, Chicago
- Starring: Pete Stacker Dave Bickler
- Production company: Coppos Films, Propaganda Films, Biscuit Filmworks, Partizan
- Country: United States; United Kingdom

Real Men of Genius is a series of advertisements, primarily 60-second American radio spots, for Bud Light beer. The campaign was originally conceived by copywriter Bob Winter and art director Mark Gross – and co-created with copywriter Bill Cimino – at DDB Chicago.

The campaign began in 1998 under the title Real American Heroes with 12 radio spots. Over 200 installments have been made. In 2001, the radio version was adapted for television in the UK, advertising Budweiser beer instead of Bud Light (Bud Light was not officially distributed in the UK at the time). The six UK TV spots maintained the same one-minute format and ran for about 18 months. In fall 2003, thirty-second versions of three UK TV spots were edited and seven new ads were produced for US television.

Anheuser-Busch is reported to have spent $38 million per year broadcasting just the radio version.

The singing was done by Dave Bickler, the lead singer of the band Survivor, known for such songs as "Eye of the Tiger" from the 1980s. The humorous, yet seriously spoken, commentary was done by voice actor Peter Stacker. Together, they made an appearance on the television show WGN Morning News and did a Real Men of Genius about the cameraman, which was a parody saying he fell asleep behind the video camera while recording the show.

== Sequence ==
Each sixty-second ad gives mock glorification in the form of a tribute to men in overlooked professions or with humorous or eccentric traits or habits. The language is very observational in style, in part parodying Budweiser's earlier This Bud's for You campaign.

The advertisement is set to early 1990s style anthemic music. The announcer (Pete Stacker) reads the mock tribute straight. Humor in part is derived from juxtaposing over-the-top vocals sung by Dave Bickler. Sometimes these vocals are augmented by a female gospel-style chorus.

In addition to providing humor, the music is an effective jingle.

== 2001/02 redaction and renaming ==
In mid-2001, Anheuser-Busch ordered another 17 Real American Hero ads be made. These ads were pulled from circulation after the 9/11 attacks as mocking American heroism then seemed questionable. The campaign relaunched in 2002 with the title and lyrics changed from Real American Heroes to Real Men of Genius.

== Release and reception ==
Anheuser-Busch were initially reluctant to air the ads because of their irreverent style. Consumer testing, however, proved them to be very popular.

The ads not only received tremendous consumer response, but also won more than 100 awards, including the prestigious Grand Prix for Radio (twice, in 2005 and 2006) as well as Gold and Bronze Lions at the Cannes International Advertising Festival and, in 2003, a Grand Clio, making it the most awarded campaign in history.

The popularity of the series led to many of the commercials being traded on peer-to-peer file sharing networks and bootleg recordings of the ads being sold on eBay.

In 2003, Anheuser-Busch released a collection of 20 ads on CD, titled Bud Light Salutes Real Men of Genius, Vol 1, to be sold in the company's online store. Two additional volumes were released soon after. In 2005, a limited edition compilation combined all prior volumes into one release, Bud Light Salutes Real Men of Genius Volumes 1, 2 and 3. Each volume contained 20 spots.

In late 2006, Anheuser-Busch sponsored a comedy tour titled "Real Men of Comedy" starring John Heffron, Joe Rogan, and Charlie Murphy. This tour featured the announcer (Stacker) and singer (Bickler) performing several of their famous commercials live at the beginning of the show. Stacker and Bickler performed regional versions of the spots to support Budweiser's comedy tour at radio stations and concert-sponsored venues such as Lollapalooza.

== Demise ==
While never officially canceled, funding for the ads was cut in June 2008. At the time, Anheuser-Busch denied the cost savings were part of a defense against hostile takeover from then-competitor InBev. In July 2008, InBev successfully purchased Anheuser Busch.

== Internet Heroes of Genius ==
On June 18, 2019, Anheuser-Busch InBev resurrected a new version of the ad campaign for the social media age called Internet Heroes of Genius, which will run on streaming audio platforms. The new series was created by Red Interactive, a division of Endeavor Global Marketing, and the brewer’s in-house agency, Draftline, and feature Brandon Beilis (singing) and Dave Steele (VO).

== Stay At Home Humans of Genius ==
In 2020, Bud Light released the Stay at Home Humans of Genius series on its YouTube channel. The series consists of four ads.

== See also ==
- I Am Canadian, a similar series of commercials for Molson Canadian
