= First Night (song) =

Single by Survivor

from the album Vital Signs
- Released: August 1985 (US)
- Recorded: 1984
- Genre: Arena rock; hard rock
- Length: 4:17
- Label: Scotti Brothers
- Songwriters: Jim Peterik; Frankie Sullivan
- Producer: Ron Nevison

Survivor singles chronology
"The Search Is Over" (1985)	"First Night" (1985)	"Burning Heart" (1985)

"First Night" is a song recorded by American rock band Survivor. It was the final charting single from their 1984 album Vital Signs, reaching number 53 on the Billboard Hot 100 on September 7, 1985.

== Charts ==
Chart (1985)	Peak position
US Billboard Hot 100	53
