= Silver Girl =

Silver Girl may refer to:

- "Silver Girl", a 1982 song by Survivor from Eye of the Tiger
- "Silver Girl", a 2003 song by Fleetwood Mac from Say You Will
