= Ever Since the World Began =

1982 single by Survivor

Song by Survivor

from the album Eye of the Tiger
- Released: 1982
- Genre: Rock
- Length: 3:48
- Label: EMI; Scotti Brothers
- Songwriters: Frankie Sullivan; Jim Peterik

"Ever Since the World Began" is a power ballad by American rock band Survivor, released in 1982 from the group's third album Eye of the Tiger, featuring Dave Bickler as lead singer. Composed by the band's guitarist Frankie Sullivan and keyboardist Jim Peterik, the song was written for someone fighting against cancer; Frankie Sullivan said in an interview that a member of his immediate family was battling the disease and later succumbed to it. He said the song had a lot of true meaning to him. It also had a lot of significance for co-writer Jim Peterik, as it was one of the final songs he played for his father before the latter's death shortly before the Eye of the Tiger album's release.

== Other versions ==
"Ever Since the World Began"

Single by Tommy Shaw

from the album Ambition
- B-side: "The Outsider"
- Released: 1987
- Recorded: 1987
- Genre: Rock
- Length: 4:08
- Label: Atlantic
- Songwriters: Frankie Sullivan; Jim Peterik

Tommy Shaw singles chronology
"No Such Thing" (1987)	"Ever Since the World Began" (1987)	"My Hallucination" (1995)

Styx member Tommy Shaw recorded his version of the song for his third solo album Ambition in 1987. It was released as a single and reached No. 75 on the U.S. Billboard Hot 100.

"Ever Since the World Began"

Single by Jimi Jamison

from the album Lock Up Soundtrack
- B-side: "Cry Alone"
- Released: 1989
- Recorded: 1989
- Genre: Rock
- Length: 3:48
- Label: Scotti Brothers
- Songwriters: Frankie Sullivan; Jim Peterik

Jimi Jamison singles chronology
"Ever Since the World Began" (1989)	"Taste of Love" (1991)

Following the temporary disbandment of Survivor in 1989, Bickler's successor in the band, Jimi Jamison recorded a solo cover of "Ever Since the World Began" for the 1989 film Lock Up. It was released as his debut solo single.
