= Dave Bickler =

American singer (born 1953)

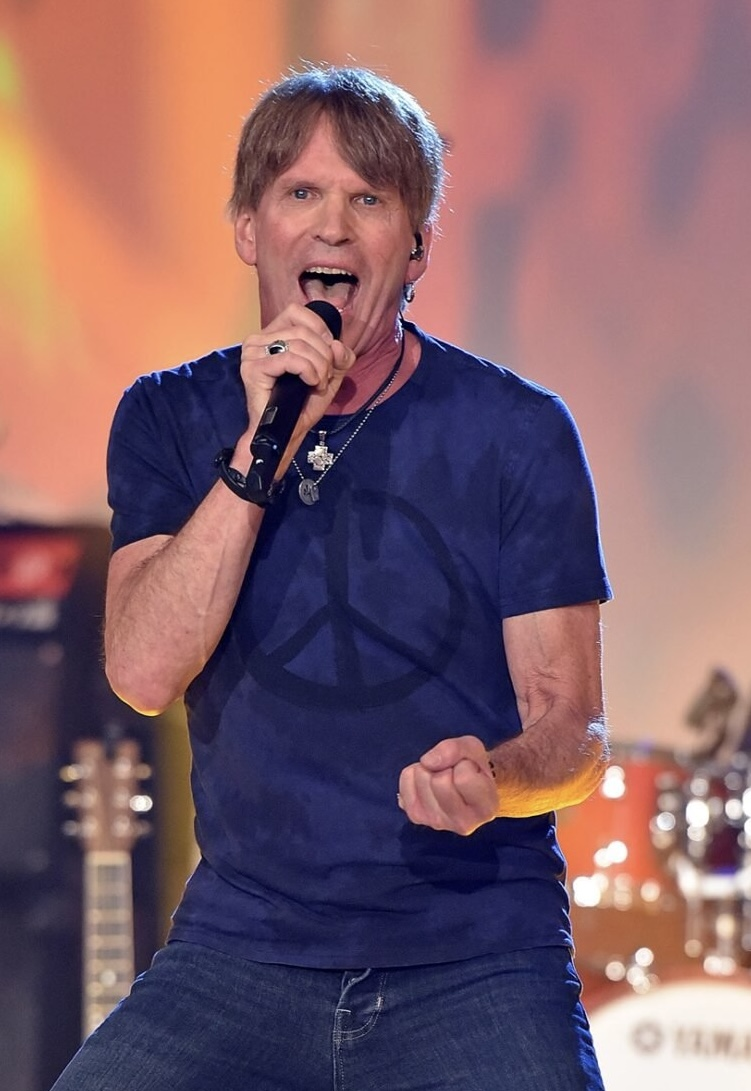
- Dave Bickler in 2018 performing on Kim Fisher presents Kulthits - Die Show mit 100 % Livemusik.

Background information
- Born: David Bickler; March 31, 1953 (age 73); North Dakota, U.S.
- Origin: Chicago, Illinois, U.S.
- Genres: Rock; AOR; hard rock
- Occupation: Singer
- Years active: 1972–present
- Formerly of: Survivor

David Bickler (born March 31, 1953) is an American singer, best known as the lead singer for the rock band Survivor from 1978 until 1983, most notably on the #1 U.S. hit "Eye of the Tiger". In addition to his wide vocal range, his trademark look included a beret. Bickler would go on to provide the vocals in advertisements, including Bud Light's "Real Men of Genius" TV and radio commercials. He left survivor in 2016 after Camron Barton had joined as he felt that’s Survivor was “his band” and did not want to share lead vocals with an unknown singer.

== Biography ==
Bickler was born in North Dakota, moved to Willmar, Minnesota, and then graduated from Benet Academy in Lisle, Illinois. As of the late 2000s, Bickler lived with his family in Brookfield, a suburb of Chicago.

== Career ==
Dave Bickler's career began in 1968 as one of two lead singers and a musician in the early 1970s American rock group Jamestown Massacre. The group's single "Summer Sun" was a Billboard Hot 100 and Easy Listening chart entry in the summer of 1972. Bickler met Jim Peterik while doing commercial jingles in the mid-1970s, leading to their future partnership in the band Survivor.

=== Survivor ===
Bickler is best known as an original member of Survivor from 1978 to 1983. He rejoined with co-founders Frankie Sullivan and Jim Peterik in 1993, staying until early 2000. He was a part of the group for their first four albums: Survivor, Premonition, Eye of The Tiger, and Caught in the Game. Although primarily serving as the band's lead vocalist during this time, he is also credited with playing keyboards on Survivor's first two albums (including being the sole keyboardist on their debut album, before rhythm guitarist Jim Peterik began to take over the role on Premonition, although future releases would see Peterik replaced in-studio by session musicians).

Survivor experienced their big breakthrough in 1982, when they were asked by Sylvester Stallone to provide the theme song for his movie Rocky III. The song, "Eye of the Tiger", soon turned into the biggest hit of the band's career. It had an enormous impact on the Billboard charts, soaring to #1 for six weeks. The song won the band a Grammy Award for Best Rock Performance By A Duo Or Group With Vocal, was voted "Best New Song" by the People's Choice Awards and received an Academy Award nomination. The song remains popular today. It came in at #18 on the Top 100 Singles chart in Billboard's 100th Anniversary issue and it is well over the 300,000 mark on the iTunes Store, where it once held #9 on their "Top Soundtrack" chart. Thanks to the song's success and another Top 20 single, "American Heartbeat", the album Eye of the Tiger peaked at #2 on the Billboard 200 chart.

Bickler also can be heard on other Survivor singles including "Somewhere in America", "Rebel Girl", "Poor Man's Son", "Summer Nights", "The One That Really Matters", "American Heartbeat", "Caught in the Game" and "Ever Since the World Began" (later re-recorded by Bickler's successor in Survivor, Jimi Jamison, as a solo single for the Lock Up film soundtrack).

Bickler left the band in late 1983 after he developed polyps on his vocal cords and required surgery and voice rest, a condition from which he would require a year and a half to recuperate.

He rejoined Survivor in early 1993 as lead vocalist for a Greatest Hits album on Scotti Bros. featuring two new songs "You Know Who You Are" and "Hungry Years" (the latter of which he co-wrote). Bickler recorded new music with the band in hopes of a new album, but ongoing lawsuits and trademark ownership issues with his initial successor in the band, Jimi Jamison halted the release.

Bickler was fired in early 2000 after a brief string of tour dates. On April 1, 2000, it was announced that for the second time Jimi Jamison was the new lead singer of Survivor.

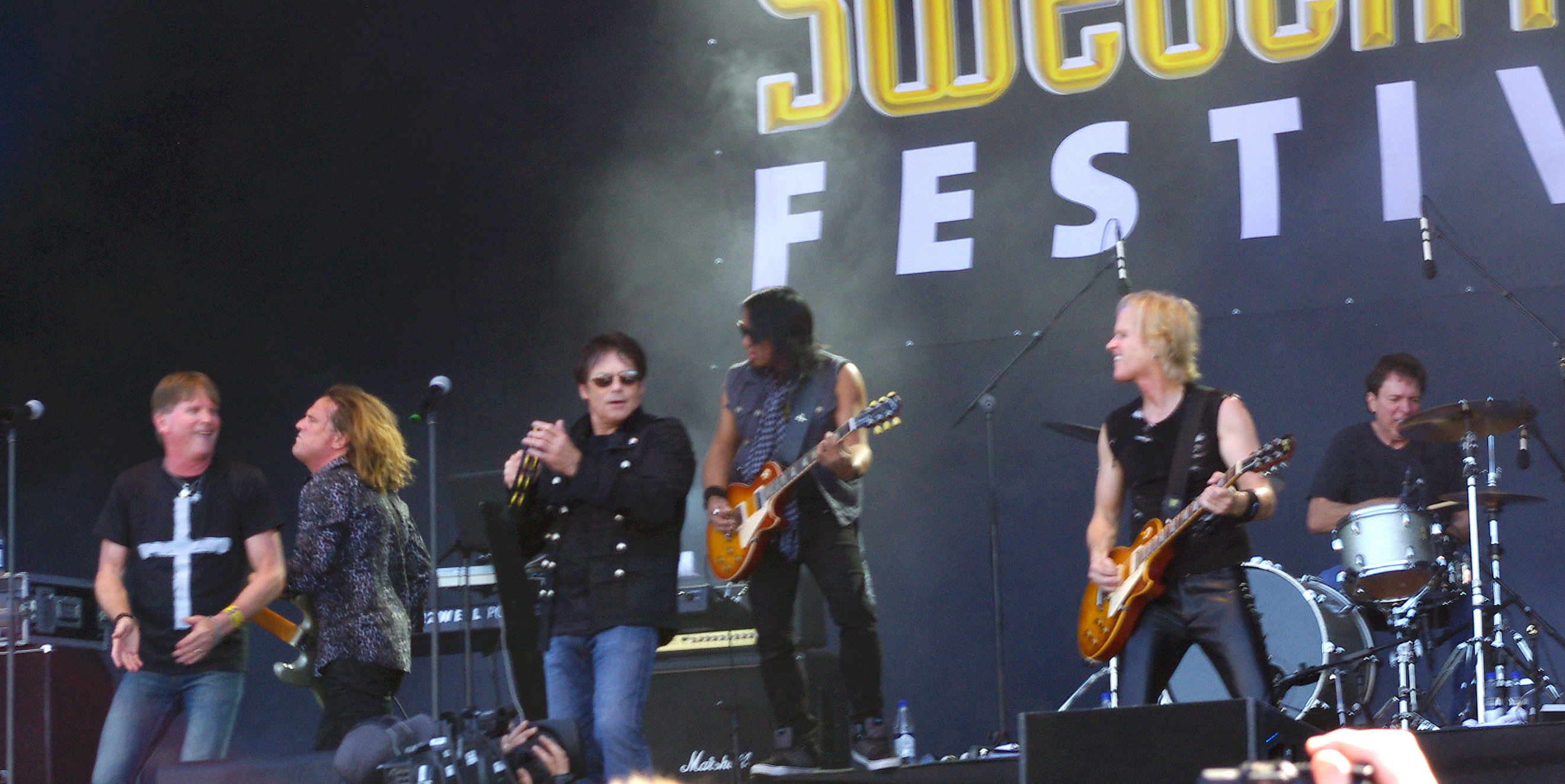
Bickler to the far left on stage at a concert in 2013

Bickler is credited with co-writing two songs on the Survivor album Reach with Frankie Sullivan: "I Don't" and "One More Chance".

In 2013, it was announced on Survivor's official media sources that guitarist Frankie Sullivan had reunited the current Survivor line-up with Dave Bickler again, with the band planning to have their two most well-known vocalists together for the next tour, Dave Bickler and Jimi Jamison. Following a year of touring together with Bickler in this lineup, Jamison died of a hemorrhagic brain stroke on September 1, 2014.

In March 2016, Bickler was again fired from Survivor.

=== Other ventures ===
After leaving Survivor in 1983, Bickler continued recording with other groups in the Chicago area and doing commercial jingles and ads.

For a period of time he was involved in teaching / mentoring, e.g. at Chappaqua Rocks summer day camp teaching voice & performance.

Since 2000, Bickler has continued his venture in recording commercials and video advertisements. His singing is featured in the successful Budweiser Light "Real American Heroes" and "Real Men of Genius" ad campaign (the decision to change the campaign from "Real American Heroes" to "Real Men of Genius" was made after 9/11) singing plaintively in counterpoint to the wry commentary of voice actor Peter Stacker. Over 100 of these commercials have been recorded and broadcast on sports radio stations and events for over ten years. A handful of CDs from the Bud Light ads have been released and one sold over 100,000 copies in its first three weeks of release. The release, according to a Pop Culture Tonight: with Patrick Phillips February 2016 interview with Dave Bickler, sold 400,000 copies.

In 2009, Bickler posted several new songs he was writing and recording for a future solo project via his Twitter account and website.

On February 2, 2012, he appeared on The Colbert Report singing a passage from Newt Gingrich's book A Nation Like No Other to the tune of "Eye of the Tiger".

In October 2017, Bickler appeared at Rockingham Festival at the Nottingham Trent University, UK. In 2018, he joined Jim Peterik on stage to perform "Caught in the Game", "Rebel Girl" and "Eye of the Tiger". On September 28, 2018, he released his debut solo album, Darklight.

On May 17, 2021, he performed on the Late Show with Stephen Colbert singing about a fugitive tiger in Houston to the tune of "Eye of the Tiger".

== Discography ==
=== With Survivor ===
- Survivor (1979)
- Premonition (1981)
- Eye of the Tiger (1982)
- Caught in the Game (1983)
- Greatest Hits (1993)
- Fire Makes Steel Demos (Bootleg) (1996)
- Reach (2006) - writer on tracks 5 & 8

=== Solo ===
- Darklight (2018)

==== Track listing ====
No.	Title	Writer(s)	Length
1.	"Hope"	Dave Bickler	3:48
2.	"Kaleidoscope"	Dave Bickler	3:00
3.	"Fear of the Dark"	Dave Bickler	5:01
4.	"Magic"	Dave Bickler	3:54
5.	"The Gift"	Dave Bickler	3:35
6.	"Always You"	Dave Bickler	3:52
7.	"Time"	Dave Bickler	4:21
8.	"Sea of Green"	Dave Bickler	4:26
9.	"Lights"	Dave Bickler	4:19
10.	"Angel Heart"	Dave Bickler	3:54
11.	"The Sky Is Falling"	Dave Bickler	3:49
