= Reach (Survivor album) =

Studio album by Survivor
- Released: April 25, 2006
- Studio: Track Record Studios (North Hollywood, California); Chicago Recording Company (Chicago, Illinois)
- Genre: Rock
- Length: 53:58
- Label: Frontiers
- Producer: Frankie Sullivan

Survivor chronology
Too Hot to Sleep (1988)	Reach (2006)

Reach is the eighth and final studio album by rock band Survivor, released under Frontiers Records on 25 April 2006. This is the band's first album in 18 years. Some of the material originates from a period from 1993 to 1996 when the band recorded demos for an unreleased album that can be heard on the Fire Makes Steel bootleg.

By this time, Frankie Sullivan was the only original member of Survivor, as Jim Peterik left the band in 1996. Following the release of this album, lead vocalist Jimi Jamison left Survivor as well, though he subsequently reunited with them in 2011. Ultimately, this turned out to be his final album with the band, due to his death in 2014.

Professional ratings
Review scores
Source	Rating
Allmusic	link

== Track listing ==
No.	Title	Writer(s)	Length
1.	"Reach"	Jimi Jamison; Todd Smallwood; Frankie Sullivan	4:42
2.	"Fire Makes Steel"	Jim Peterik; Sullivan	5:12
3.	"Nevertheless"	Peterik; Sullivan	4:03
4.	"Seconds Away"	Mary Beth Derry; Adrian Gurvitz; Sullivan	4:33
5.	"One More Chance"	Dave Bickler; Sullivan	5:02
6.	"Give Me the Word"	Jamison; Smallwood; Sullivan	3:42
7.	"Rhythm of Your Heart"	Curt Cuomo; Peterik; Sullivan	3:59
8.	"I Don't"	Bickler; Sullivan	4:29
9.	"Half of My Heart"	Smallwood; Sullivan	5:24
10.	"Talkin' 'Bout Love"	Chris Grove; Sullivan	4:11
11.	"Don't Give Up"	Jamison; Smallwood; Sullivan	3:52
12.	"Home"	Jamison; Smallwood; Sullivan	4:44
Total length:			53:58

== Personnel ==
Survivor

- Jimi Jamison – lead vocals (all songs except 3 and 10), backing vocals
- Chris Grove – keyboards
- Frankie Sullivan – guitars, backing vocals, lead vocals (3, 10)
- Barry Dunaway – bass (1, 3, 5, 7, 8, 10–12)
- Marc Droubay – drums

Additional musicians

- Kim Bullard – keyboards, bass and programming (4)
- Randy Riley – bass (2, 4, 6)
- Mark Christian – bass (4, 9)

== Production ==
- Frankie Sullivan – producer
- Phil Bonanno – engineer
- Tim LeBlanc – engineer, mixing
- Chris Steinmetz – engineer
- Andy Hayes – assistant engineer
- Sangwook Nam – mastering
- Doug Sax – mastering
- The Mastering Lab (Hollywood, California) – mastering location
- Ioannis – art direction, design, artwork
- Alex Solca – band photography
