= Rocky IV: Original Motion Picture Soundtrack =

1985 soundtrack album by various artists

Soundtrack album by Various artists
- Released: November 27, 1985
- Studios: Unique Recording Studios, New York City
- Genres: AOR, hard rock
- Length: 43:39
- Label: Scotti Bros.

Singles from Rocky IV
- 1. "Burning Heart" Released: October 1985; 2. "Living in America" Released: December 1985; 3. "Heart's on Fire" Released: March 1986; 4. "No Easy Way Out" Released: 1986; 5. "War/Fanfare" Released: 1986 (GER)

Professional ratings
Review scores
Source	Rating
AllMusic	3/5 stars

Rocky IV: Original Motion Picture Soundtrack is the original motion picture soundtrack to the movie of the same name. It was released on November 27, 1985, by Scotti Bros. Records.

The soundtrack was hugely successful on the strength of two top-five singles, Survivor's "Burning Heart" (personally commissioned for the film by Sylvester Stallone), which reached No. 2 on the Billboard Hot 100 and James Brown's "Living in America", which reached #4, as well as Robert Tepper's lone top-40 hit, "No Easy Way Out", which reached #22. The album reached the top ten on the US Billboard 200 album chart and was certified Platinum by the RIAA. "The Sweetest Victory" by Touch features lead vocals by Marq Torien, who in 1988 rose to prominence as the lead vocalist of BulletBoys.

It is the only score to a Rocky film not composed by Bill Conti, though it does incorporate some music he composed for the first film.

== Track listing ==
Side one
No.	Title	Writer(s)	Artist(s)	Length
1.	"Burning Heart"	Jim Peterik; Frankie Sullivan	Survivor	3:51
2.	"Heart's on Fire"	Vince DiCola; Ed Fruge; Joe Esposito	John Cafferty	4:14
3.	"Double or Nothing"	Kenny Loggins; Paul Williams; Steve Dorff	Kenny Loggins & Gladys Knight	3:25
4.	"Eye of the Tiger"	Peterik; Sullivan	Survivor	3:46
5.	"War"	DiCola; Bill Conti	Vince DiCola	5:53

Side two
No.	Title	Writer(s)	Artist(s)	Length
1.	"Living in America"	Charlie Midnight; Dan Hartman	James Brown	4:40
2.	"No Easy Way Out"	Tepper	Robert Tepper	4:32
3.	"One Way Street"	Peter Cox; Richard Drummie	Go West	4:37
4.	"The Sweetest Victory"	Jake Hooker; Duane Hitchings	Touch	4:26
5.	"Training Montage"	DiCola	Vince DiCola	3:37

== Re-releases and covers ==
The 2006 reissue, remastered by BMG, featured the bonus track "Man Against the World" by Survivor, a song written for but ultimately cut from the final movie tracklist.

"Eye of the Tiger" was covered and partially sampled over 80 times

"No Easy Way Out" was covered multiple times by:

- Bullet for My Valentine — on their 2008 "Scream Aim Fire" album (as Bonus track for Japanese release)
- Eve To Adam — on their 2018 album "Ithaca"
  - in 2019 they released a music video for this cover.
- Beast in Black — on their 2019 "From Hell with Love" album
- and other artists

== Charts ==
=== Weekly charts ===
Chart (1985–1986)	Peak position
Australia (Kent Music Report)	32
Austrian Albums (Ö3 Austria)	2
Canada Top Albums/CDs (RPM)	24
Dutch Albums (Album Top 100)	1
German Albums (Offizielle Top 100)	2
Norwegian Albums (VG-lista)	13
Swedish Albums (Sverigetopplistan)	5
Swiss Albums (Schweizer Hitparade)	1
UK Albums (Official Charts)	3
US Billboard 200	10

Chart (2026)	Peak position
US Soundtrack Albums (Billboard)	23

=== Year-end charts ===
Chart (1986)	Position
Austrian Albums (Ö3 Austria)	11
Canada Top Albums/CDs (RPM)	94
Dutch Albums (Album Top 100)	15
German Albums (Offizielle Top 100)	25
Swiss Albums (Schweizer Hitparade)	15
US Billboard 200	65

== Certifications ==
Region	Certification	Certified units/sales
Belgium (BRMA)	Gold	25,000^{*}
Canada (Music Canada)	Platinum	100,000^{^}
France (SNEP)	Gold	100,000^{*}
Italy (FIMI)	Gold	25,000^{‡}
New Zealand (RMNZ)	Platinum	15,000^{‡}
United Kingdom (BPI)	Gold	100,000^{^}
United States (RIAA)	Platinum	1,000,000^{^}
^{*} Sales figures based on certification alone.^{^} Shipments figures based on certification alone.^{‡} Sales+streaming figures based on certification alone.
