= The Moment of Truth (song) =

Single by Survivor

from the album The Karate Kid
- Released: June 1984 (US)
- Recorded: 1984
- Genre: Rock; new wave; power pop
- Length: 3:47
- Songwriters: Bill Conti; Dennis Lambert; Peter Beckett

Survivor singles chronology
"I Never Stopped Loving You" (1984)	"The Moment of Truth" (1984)	"I Can't Hold Back" (1984)

"The Moment of Truth" is a song recorded by the rock band Survivor. It was the first hit single with their new lead singer Jimi Jamison, originally from Cobra, who replaced Dave Bickler. After making the No. 1 hit "Eye of the Tiger" for Rocky III, the band was asked to perform a composed song for the 1984 film The Karate Kid. The song reached No. 63 on the Billboard Hot 100 on July 7, 1984, and stayed on the chart for seven weeks. It was later re-issued on the Vital Signs album in 2009 by Rock Candy.

== Critical reception ==
In a September 1984 review, Vici MacDonald of Smash Hits called the song a "horrible example of American pomp-rock."

== Music video ==
The music video shows the band performing in a Japanese-style park with mixed scenes from the movie. The song was written by Bill Conti, Dennis Lambert, and Peter Beckett, and was published by Karussell Label.

== Charts ==
Chart (1984)	Peak position
El Salvador (UPI)	9
Panama (UPI)	10
US Billboard Hot 100	63

== Cover versions ==
- Mari Hamada covered the song for her 1985 album Rainbow Dream.
- Carrie Underwood covered the song for her appearance in the fourth season of the Netflix series Cobra Kai.
