= Caught in the Game (song) =

1983 single by Survivor

Single by Survivor

from the album Caught in the Game
- Released: October 1983
- Studio: Rumbo Recorders (Los Angeles)
- Genre: Rock
- Length: 4:46
- Label: Scotti Bros.
- Songwriters: Jim Peterik; Frankie Sullivan
- Producers: Peterik; Sullivan

Survivor singles chronology
"The One That Really Matters" (1982)	"Caught in the Game" (1983)	"Slander" (1983)

Music video
- "Caught in the Game" on YouTube

"Caught in the Game" is a song by American rock band Survivor, released in October 1983 as the lead single from their fourth studio album of the same name (1983). Jim Peterik regarded the song's guitar riff as "perhaps the most powerful and enduring riff" that Frankie Sullivan had ever created.

== Music video ==
The music video finds Survivor playing a game of craps. Peterik described it as "unintentionally camp" and believed it contributed to the album being less successful than their previous work.

== Charts ==
Chart (1983)	Peak position
US Billboard Hot 100	77
US Mainstream Rock (Billboard)	16
