= I Can't Hold Back =

1984 single by the rock band Survivor

Single by Survivor

from the album Vital Signs
- B-side: "I See You In Everyone"
- Released: September 1984
- Recorded: 1984
- Genre: Arena rock
- Length: 3:58
- Label: Scotti Brothers
- Songwriters: Jim Peterik, Frankie Sullivan
- Producer: Ron Nevison

Survivor singles chronology
"The Moment of Truth" (1984)	"I Can't Hold Back" (1984)	"High on You" (1985)

Music video
- "I Can't Hold Back" on YouTube

"I Can't Hold Back" is a 1984 song recorded by the rock band Survivor. It was the first hit single from album Vital Signs (their first album with vocalist Jimi Jamison). The song reached No. 13 on the Billboard Hot 100 and No. 14 on the Cash Box Top 100. It also returned the band to No. 1 for three weeks on the Billboard Top Rock Tracks chart.

== Background ==
Like most of Survivor's hits, this song was written by guitarist Frankie Sullivan and keyboard player/guitarist Jim Peterik. While their relationship was becoming strained, they managed to set aside their differences during songwriting sessions. According to Peterik, the writing of this song was the high point of their collaborations, with Sullivan coming up with guitar riffs and Peterik forming melodies and writing most of the lyrics. Peterik had the title in mind for two years before they were able to craft it into a song. After Sullivan came up with a riff, Peterik sang the first line, "There's a story in my eyes." Sullivan then chimed in with the next line, "Turn the pages of desire." From there, they put together this song about a guy whose heart is filled with desire. Peterik says the pre-chorus on this song is what gives it a killer hook: "I can feel you tremble when we touch..."

Jamison proved a worthy frontman and a photogenic face of the band, which helped the video for this song get significant airplay on MTV.

Ron Nevison, who also worked on albums by Heart, Chicago and Night Ranger, produced the Vital Signs album. Peterik credits him for coming up with a very unusual arrangement on this track, mixing up sections to keep it interesting. The video, which was directed by Bob Radler, was shot in Chicago and partly based on a scene in the film Risky Business. Jamison's love interest in the clip is Lee Ann Marie, who can be seen riding a float in the film Ferris Bueller's Day Off. MTV, which had been on the air only three years, gave the video plenty of spins.

== Charts ==
Chart (1984)	Peak position
US Billboard Hot 100	13
US Billboard Top Rock Tracks	1
Australia (Kent Music Report)	94
Belgium Singles Chart	18
Canada RPM Singles	19
UK Singles Chart (OCC)	80

Year-end chart (1985)	Rank
US Top Pop Singles (Billboard)	73
