= Is This Love (Survivor song) =

Single by Survivor

from the album When Seconds Count
- B-side: "Can't Let You Go"
- Released: October 1986 (US)
- Recorded: 1986
- Genre: Pop rock; soft rock
- Length: 3:42
- Label: Scotti Bros.
- Songwriters: Jim Peterik, Frankie Sullivan
- Producers: Ron Nevison, Frankie Sullivan

Survivor singles chronology
"Burning Heart" (1985)	"Is This Love" (1986)	"How Much Love" (1987)

Music video
- "Is This Love" on YouTube

"Is This Love" is a song by American rock band Survivor. The song was released on October 1, 1986 as the first single from Survivor's sixth album, When Seconds Count. A video was made and put into heavy rotation on MTV.

== Background ==
"Is This Love" was written by keyboard player Jim Peterik and guitarist Frankie Sullivan. Peterik has explained "Is This Love" as follows: "That's another song that I wrote out of experience. 'We run those mean streets, blind alleys where the currency of love changes hands, all touch, no feeling, just another one night stand,' we've all felt that. I felt that when I was dating and on the road and empty relationships that you knew weren't going to go anywhere. What is love? It's a guy questioning that."

== Charts ==
In January 1987, "Is This Love" peaked at No. 9 on the Billboard Hot 100, becoming their fifth and last top 10 hit.

Year-end chart (1987)	Position
US Top Pop Singles (Billboard)	78
