= The Search Is Over =

Single by Survivor

from the album Vital Signs
- B-side: "It's the Singer, Not the Song"
- Released: April 1985
- Recorded: 1984
- Genre: Soft rock
- Length: 4:14
- Label: Scotti Brothers
- Songwriters: Frankie Sullivan, Jim Peterik
- Producer: Ron Nevison

Survivor singles chronology
"High on You" (1985)	"The Search Is Over" (1985)	"First Night" (1985)

Music video
- The Search Is Over on YouTube

"The Search Is Over" is a 1985 power ballad by the American rock band Survivor. It was the band's third single and second top-ten hit from their 1984 album Vital Signs.

== Background ==
Former keyboardist/guitarist for the band and co-songwriter Jim Peterik told Songfacts: "It wasn't about my life as much as a friend of mine who had a girlfriend – really a play pal throughout their growing up years – and never thought it could be anything more than that. It was looking him straight in the face that this was the girl of his destiny, and he looked everywhere to find that dream girl only to come back to the sandbox."

== Critical reception ==
In a contemporary review for Sounds, Roger Holland gave a tongue-in-cheek assessment of the single, referencing the band's association with the Rocky film franchise. He remarked that "Rocky’s boys go punchy," noting that the group was attempting to jump on the "we’re-all-deeply-sensitive-people-really" bandwagon established by contemporary acts like REO Speedwagon and Foreigner, jokingly adding an exception for the band's drummer.

== Charts ==
It peaked at No. 4 on the Billboard Hot 100 the week of July 13, 1985, and finished at No. 48 on the year-end Billboard Hot 100 chart for 1985. The song also spent four weeks atop the Adult Contemporary chart, Survivor's only chart-topper on this tally.

Chart (1985)	Peak position
US Billboard Hot 100	4
US Adult Contemporary (Billboard)	1
Australia (Kent Music Report)	60
Canadian Top Singles (RPM)	21

=== Year-end charts ===
Chart (1985)	Rank
US Top Pop Singles (Billboard)	48

== See also ==
- List of Hot Adult Contemporary number ones of 1985
