= High on You (Survivor song) =

1985 single by Survivor

Single by Survivor

from the album Vital Signs
- B-side: "Everlasting"
- Released: November 1984 (UK); January 1985 (US)
- Recorded: 1984
- Genre: Pop rock; arena rock
- Length: 4:09
- Label: Scotti Brothers
- Songwriter(s): Frankie Sullivan; Jim Peterik
- Producer(s): Ron Nevison

Survivor singles chronology
"I Can't Hold Back" (1984)	"High on You" (1984)	"The Search Is Over" (1985)

Alternative cover
- German 7" Sleeve

"High on You" is a song by the American rock band Survivor. It was the band's second single and first top-ten hit from their 1984 album Vital Signs. A music video was also made, and like other Vital Signs videos, was given heavy play on MTV.

== Background ==
"High on You" was one of Sullivan and Peterik's compositions. "This is one song that's not brain surgery. It came from a jam. A lot of great songs come from jam sessions. I remember soundchecks with Survivor and The Ides of March, and there's no better place to start a jam than on stage. Everything is miked-up, you're in a good mood, the lights come on, the audience isn't there yet and you start jamming. "High on You" was similar to that, only it started in rehearsal. Frankie started jamming on this really great guitar riff. I started laying my right hand on the keyboard and coming up with that very sing-song melody."

Peterik told Songfacts: "Lyrically, I've had that title ever since the CBS convention in 1977 when Sly Stone of Sly & the Family Stone - there were rumors about him being strung out on drugs - he bolts on stage all cleaned up and says, 'I want you to know, people, I am high on you." Everybody applauded. There's a title if I ever heard one, so I guess indirectly he inspired that song."

== Charts ==
It peaked at No. 8 on the Billboard Hot 100 the week of March 23, 1985. It also reached No. 8 on the Top Rock Tracks chart.

Chart (1985)	Peak position
US Billboard Hot 100	8
US Top Rock Tracks	8
