= When Seconds Count =

Studio album by Survivor
- Released: October 13, 1986
- Studios: One On One Studios (North Hollywood, California); Record Plant and Rumbo Recorders (Los Angeles, California); Manzanita Studio (Valyermo, California); Can-Am Recorders (Tarzana, California); Royal Recorders (Lake Geneva, Wisconsin); Ripe Studios (London, UK)
- Genres: Pop rock; hard rock; soft rock
- Length: 42:09
- Labels: Scotti Bros.; Epic (South America)
- Producers: Ron Nevison; Frankie Sullivan

Survivor chronology
Vital Signs (1984)	When Seconds Count (1986)	Too Hot to Sleep (1988)

Singles from When Seconds Count
- 1. "Is This Love" Released: October 1986 (US); 2. "How Much Love" Released: February 1987 (US); 3. "Man Against the World" Released: April 1987 (US); 4. "In Good Faith" Released: October 1987 (Germany)

When Seconds Count is the sixth studio album by the American rock band Survivor, released in October 1986. The album included the hit single, "Is This Love", which peaked at #9 in the US on the Billboard Hot 100 chart in early 1987. The album reached #49 on the Billboard 200 album chart. The album cover was designed by Rick Valicenti and Craig Davidson in Chicago during the summer of 1986.

This is one of the many Survivor albums briefly taken out of print in 2009. However, it was remastered and reissued in 2011 and distributed by Rock Candy Records.

Professional ratings
Review scores
Source	Rating
Allmusic	link

== Track listing ==
All tracks are written by Jim Peterik and Frankie Sullivan, except where noted.

Side one
No.	Title	Writer(s)	Length
1.	"How Much Love"		3:58
2.	"Keep It Right Here"	Jimi Jamison; Peterik; Sullivan	4:28
3.	"Is This Love"		3:42
4.	"Man Against the World"	Jamison; Peterik; Sullivan	3:35
5.	"Rebel Son"	Jamison; Peterik; Sullivan	4:37

Side two
No.	Title	Writer(s)	Length
6.	"Oceans"		4:39
7.	"When Seconds Count"		4:05
8.	"Backstreet Love Affair"		4:01
9.	"In Good Faith"	Jamison; Peterik; Sullivan	4:22
10.	"Can't Let You Go"		4:42
Total length:			42:09

Rock Candy CD reissue only

No.	Title	Length
11.	"Burning Heart"	3:53

== Personnel ==
Survivor

- Jimi Jamison – lead vocals, backing vocals
- Jim Peterik – keyboards, additional backing vocals
- Frankie Sullivan – guitars, backing vocals
- Stephan Ellis – bass
- Marc Droubay – drums

Additional musicians

- Mike Moran – synthesizers
- Bill Cuomo – additional synthesizers
- Tom Kelly – backing vocals
- Tommy Shaw – additional backing vocals

== Production ==
- Ron Nevison – producer, engineer
- Frankie Sullivan – producer
- Jim Peterik – associate producer (4)
- Phil Bonanno – engineer
- Mike Clink – engineer
- David DeVore – engineer
- Allen Abrahamson – second engineer
- Jim Bineen – second engineer
- Dan Harjung – second engineer
- Stan Katayama – second engineer
- Steve Klein – second engineer
- Julian Stoll – second engineer
- Toby Wright – second engineer
- Mike Reese – mastering at The Mastering Lab (Hollywood, California)
- Jimmy Watchel – album art coordination
- Thirst – art direction
- Rick Valicenti and Craig Davidson – cover design
- Corinne Pfister – cover photography
- Tom Vack – cover photography
- Randee St. Nicholas – portrait photography
- Ron Larson – hand tinting
- John Baruck – management
- Tom Consolo – management

== Charts ==
Chart (1987)	Peak position
Finnish Albums (The Official Finnish Charts)	38
Japanese Albums (Oricon)	68
Swedish Albums (Sverigetopplistan)	30
US Billboard 200	49
