= Vital Signs (Survivor album) =

1984 studio album by the rock band Survivor

Studio album by Survivor
- Released: September 1984
- Studios: The Plant Studios (Sausalito, California); Record Plant (Los Angeles, California)
- Genres: Arena rock; hard rock
- Length: 40:38
- Labels: Scotti Bros.; Volcano
- Producer: Ron Nevison

Survivor chronology
Caught in the Game (1983)	Vital Signs (1984)	When Seconds Count (1986)

Singles from Vital Signs
- 1. "I Can't Hold Back" Released: September 1984 (US); 2. "High on You" Released: November 1984 (UK); 3. "The Search Is Over" Released: April 1985 (US); 4. "First Night" Released: August 1985 (US)

Professional ratings
Review scores
Source	Rating
AllMusic	3/5 stars
Melodic.net	5/5 stars
The Daily Vault	A

Vital Signs is the fifth studio album by American rock band Survivor and their first with vocalist Jimi Jamison, released in September 1984. The album was their second most successful in the U.S., reaching number 16 on the Billboard album charts and certified platinum by the RIAA. The album includes the singles "I Can't Hold Back" which peaked at number 13 on the Billboard Hot 100 chart, "High on You" reached number 8, "The Search Is Over" at number 4 and "First Night" at number 53.

Vital Signs is one of the very few studio albums that remained commercially available by Volcano Entertainment after they took a great deal of Survivor's releases out of print in August 2009.

== CD releases ==
Vital Signs was first issued on CD in August 1984 and before the Vinyl and Cassette (the matrix on the initial pressing is “11B1”). In 2010 Rock Candy Records remastered the content of Vital Signs and reissued the album on CD. The track "The Moment of Truth" (from The Karate Kid soundtrack), promoted on this re-release as a "bonus track" on the back cover, had been issued as track 10 on a CD before by Bellaphon in 1984.

== Track listing ==
All tracks are written by Jim Peterik and Frankie Sullivan.

Side one
No.	Title	Length
1.	"I Can't Hold Back"	3:59
2.	"High on You"	4:09
3.	"First Night"	4:17
4.	"The Search Is Over"	4:13
5.	"Broken Promises"	4:01

Side two
No.	Title	Length
6.	"Popular Girl"	3:39
7.	"Everlasting"	3:52
8.	"It's the Singer, Not the Song"	4:34
9.	"I See You in Everyone"	4:26
Total length:		40:38

Bellaphon (1984)/Rock Candy (2010) reissue bonus track

No.	Title	Writer(s)	Length
10.	"The Moment of Truth"	Bill Conti; Dennis Lambert; Peter Beckett	3:47

== Personnel ==
Survivor

- Jimi Jamison – lead vocals
- Jim Peterik – keyboards, backing vocals
- Frankie Sullivan – guitars, backing vocals
- Stephan Ellis – bass
- Marc Droubay – drums

Additional musicians

- Peter Wolf – synthesizers, orchestration (4)
- Billy Lee Lewis – percussion
- Mickey Thomas – backing vocals

== Production ==
- Ron Nevison – producer, engineer
- Kevin Eddy – assistant engineer
- Nick Sanchez – assistant engineer
- Doug Sax – mastering at The Mastering Lab (Hollywood, California)
- Mick Higgins – cover concept
- Rick Weigand – cover concept
- Jim Marshall – cover photography
- John Baruck – direction
- Alex Kochan – direction

== Charts ==
Chart (1984)	Peak position
Canada Top Albums/CDs (RPM)	85
Swedish Albums (Sverigetopplistan)	48
Swiss Albums (Schweizer Hitparade)	27
US Billboard 200	16

== Certifications ==
Region	Certification	Certified units/sales
Canada (Music Canada)	Gold	50,000^{^}
United States (RIAA)	Platinum	1,000,000^{^}
^{^} Shipments figures based on certification alone.
