= Burning Heart (song) =

1985 single by Survivor

Single by Survivor

from the album Rocky IV: Original Motion Picture Soundtrack
- B-side: "Feels Like Love"
- Released: October 21, 1985
- Genre: Hard rock
- Length: 3:51
- Label: Scotti Bros
- Songwriters: Jim Peterik; Frankie Sullivan
- Producers: Jim Peterik; Frankie Sullivan

Survivor singles chronology
"First Night" (1985)	"Burning Heart" (1985)	"Is This Love" (1986)

"Burning Heart" is a song by American rock band Survivor. It appeared in the 1985 film Rocky IV and on its soundtrack album; the film's star Sylvester Stallone personally commissioned the song. The single peaked at number two on the US Billboard Hot 100 chart for two weeks; it was the biggest hit the band had with Jimi Jamison on lead vocals. It was also a hit internationally, topping the charts of Belgium and Switzerland and entering the top 10 in several other European countries.

== Content ==
"Burning Heart", which is about an "all or nothing" battle, was inspired by the Cold War, as shown by lyrics such as "Is it East versus West?" and "Can any nation stand alone?" The Communist East versus Capitalist West conflict is reflected in the film by the fight in the boxing ring between Rocky and Ivan Drago.

== Music video ==
The music video for "Burning Heart" features Survivor giving a concert, mixed with scenes from the film Rocky IV. A version with only the band (no movie footage) also exists, available on YouTube.

== Reception ==
In Smash Hits, Janice Long wrote, "Watch out, "Eye of the Tiger" Mark 2. It sounds like exactly the same backing track, and it's from Rocky IV. I think we could live without this record."

== Track listings ==
7-inch single

1. "Burning Heart" – 3:51
2. "Feels Like Love" – 3:20

12-inch maxi

1. "Burning Heart" – 3:51
2. "Eye of the Tiger" – 3:46
3. "Feels Like Love" – 3:20

== Charts ==
=== Weekly charts ===
Weekly chart performance for "Burning Heart"
Chart (1985–86)	Peak position
Australia (Kent Music Report)	55
Austria (Ö3 Austria Top 40)	6
Belgium (Ultratop 50 Flanders)	1
Canada (The Record)	16
Canada Top Singles (RPM)	14
Europe (European Hot 100 Singles)	1
Finland (Suomen virallinen lista)	2
France (SNEP)	2
Ireland (IRMA)	2
Italy (Musica e Dischi)	5
Netherlands (Dutch Top 40)	2
Netherlands (Single Top 100)	2
South Africa (Springbok Radio)	27
Sweden (Sverigetopplistan)	5
Switzerland (Schweizer Hitparade)	1
UK Singles (Official Charts)	5
US Billboard Hot 100	2
US Adult Contemporary (Billboard)	35
US Mainstream Rock (Billboard)	11
West Germany (GfK)	6

=== Year-end charts ===
Annual chart rankings for "Burning Heart"
Chart (1986)	Position
Belgium (Ultratop)	19
Europe (European Hot 100 Singles)	4
Italy (Musica e Dischi)	44
Netherlands (Dutch Top 40)	17
Netherlands (Single Top 100)	12
Switzerland (Schweizer Hitparade)	15
US Billboard Hot 100	8
West Germany (Media Control)	30

== Certifications ==
Certifications and sales for "Burning Heart"
Region	Certification	Certified units/sales
France (SNEP)	Gold	500,000^{*}
Italy (FIMI)	Gold	50,000^{‡}
United Kingdom (BPI)	Gold	400,000^{‡}
^{*} Sales figures based on certification alone.^{‡} Sales+streaming figures based on certification alone.

== Cover versions ==
- 1999: Jimi Jamison released a live version of "Burning Heart" on his album Empires.
- 2003: Seventh Avenue
