= Caught in the Game =

Studio album by Survivor
- Released: September 29, 1983
- Studio: Rumbo Recorders (Hollywood, California)
- Genre: Hard rock, pop rock
- Length: 41:43
- Label: Scotti Bros.
- Producer: Frankie Sullivan

Survivor chronology
Eye of the Tiger (1982)	Caught in the Game (1983)	Vital Signs (1984)

Singles from Caught in the Game
- 1. "Caught in the Game" Released: October 1983 (US); 2. "Slander" Released: December 1983 (Ger.); 3. "I Never Stopped Loving You" Released: February 1984; 4. "It Doesn't Have to Be This Way" Released: June 1984

Professional ratings
Review scores
Source	Rating
AllMusic	2.5/5 stars

Caught in the Game is the fourth album by American rock band Survivor, released on September 29, 1983. It features guest appearances by Mr. Mister's Richard Page and REO Speedwagon's Kevin Cronin. It is the band's last album to-date to feature lead vocalist Dave Bickler, who left due to vocal surgery. Bickler rejoined the band from 1993 to 2000, and again from 2013 to 2016. The first single "Caught in the Game" went to #77 at Billboard Hot 100 chart and later "I Never Stopped Loving You" failed to hit the Hot 100 reaching only #104.

The hard to find 1999 Pony Canyon Japanese release on CD featured an insert with lyrics in English and Japanese and an OBI strip. The album was one of the many Survivor albums briefly taken out of print in 2009. However, it was remastered and reissued in 2010, distributed by Rock Candy Records.

== Track listing ==
All tracks are written by Jim Peterik and Frankie Sullivan, except "What Do You Really Think?", written by Peterik.

Side one
No.	Title	Length
1.	"Caught in the Game"	4:46
2.	"Jackie Don't Go"	4:04
3.	"I Never Stopped Loving You"	4:07
4.	"It Doesn't Have to Be This Way"	3:59
5.	"Ready for the Real Thing"	3:55

Side two
No.	Title	Length
6.	"Half-Life"	5:06
7.	"What Do You Really Think?"	3:48
8.	"Slander"	5:18
9.	"Santa Ana Winds"	6:35
Total length:		41:43

== Personnel ==
Survivor

- Dave Bickler – lead vocals
- Jim Peterik – keyboards, backing vocals
- Frankie Sullivan – guitars, backing vocals
- Stephan Ellis – bass
- Marc Droubay – drums

Additional musicians

- Daryl Dragon – additional keyboards
- Dave Arellano – additional synthesizers
- Tom Kelly – backing vocals
- Richard Page – backing vocals
- Kevin Cronin – backing vocals

Production

- Frankie Sullivan – producer, additional engineer
- Jim Peterik – assistant producer
- Mike Clink – engineer
- Julian Stoll – second engineer
- Mike Reese – mastering
- Doug Sax – mastering
- The Mastering Lab (Hollywood, California) – mastering location
- Glen Wexler – art direction, design, photography
- Kurt Triffet – design, illustration
- Harrison Funk – inner sleeve photos
- John Baruck Management – direction

== Charts ==
Chart (1983)	Peak position
German Albums (Offizielle Top 100)	63
US Billboard 200	82
