= Too Hot to Sleep =

Studio album by Survivor
- Released: October 3, 1988
- Studio: Royal Recorders (Lake Geneva, Wisconsin) Right Track Recording (New York City, New York)
- Genre: Hard rock; pop rock
- Length: 52:04
- Label: Scotti Bros.
- Producer: Frankie Sullivan; Frank Filipetti

Survivor chronology
When Seconds Count (1986)	Too Hot to Sleep (1988)	Reach (2006)

Singles from Too Hot to Sleep
- 1. "Didn't Know It Was Love" Released: October 1988 (US); 2. "Across the Miles" Released: January 1989

Too Hot to Sleep is the seventh studio album from rock band Survivor, released in 1988. It was a relative commercial disappointment, reaching only #187 on the Billboard album charts, though "Across the Miles" is one of their biggest AC chart hits. After this album, founders Frankie Sullivan and Jim Peterik put the band on indefinite hiatus, while lead vocalist Jimi Jamison would continue to tour under the Survivor name (thus resulting in a lengthy court battle regarding rights to the name). Drummer Marc Droubay and bassist Stephan Ellis were replaced by studio musicians on the album. This album marks the final Survivor release to feature Peterik. The lineup of Sullivan and Jamison would not reunite until 2000.

This is one of the many Survivor albums briefly taken out of print in 2009. However, it was remastered and reissued in 2011 and distributed by Rock Candy Records.

Professional ratings
Review scores
Source	Rating
Allmusic	2/5 stars

== Track listing ==
All tracks are written by Jim Peterik and Frankie Sullivan, except where noted.

Side one
No.	Title	Writer(s)	Length
1.	"She's a Star"		5:44
2.	"Desperate Dreams"		4:46
3.	"Too Hot to Sleep"	Jimi Jamison; Peterik; Sullivan	4:48
4.	"Didn't Know It Was Love"		4:22
5.	"Rhythm of the City"	Jamison; Peterik; Sullivan	5:23

Side two
No.	Title	Length
6.	"Here Comes Desire"	6:43
7.	"Across the Miles"	5:51
8.	"Tell Me I'm the One"	5:10
9.	"Can't Give It Up"	4:24
10.	"Burning Bridges"	5:22
Total length:		52:04

== Personnel ==
Survivor

- Jimi Jamison – lead vocals, backing vocals
- Jim Peterik – keyboards
- Frankie Sullivan – guitars, backing vocals

Additional musicians

- Peter-John Vettese – keyboards
- Bill Syniar – bass
- Mickey Curry – drums
- Ian Lloyd – backing vocals
- Tommy Shaw – backing vocals
- Rory Dodd – additional lead vocals (7)

== Production ==
- Frankie Sullivan – producer
- Frank Filipetti – producer, engineer, mixing
- Jim Peterik – associate producer
- Jeff Abikzer – second engineer
- Dan Harjung – second engineer
- Danny Mormando – second engineer
- Doug Sax – mastering at The Mastering Lab (Hollywood, California)
- Hugh Syme – art direction, cover design
- Jay Buchsbaum – photography
- John Baruke – management
- Tom Consolo – management
- Frank Rand – management

== Charts ==
Chart (1988)	Peak position
German Albums (Offizielle Top 100)	55
Japanese Albums (Oricon)	82
Swedish Albums (Sverigetopplistan)	48
Swiss Albums (Schweizer Hitparade)	23
US Billboard 200	187
