= Eye of the Tiger (album) =

Studio album by Survivor
- Released: June 8, 1982
- Recorded: 1981–1982
- Studio: Rumbo Recorders (Los Angeles)
- Genre: Hard rock
- Length: 38:11
- Label: Scotti Bros.
- Producer: Frankie Sullivan

Survivor chronology
Premonition (1981)	Eye of the Tiger (1982)	Caught in the Game (1983)

Singles from Eye of the Tiger
- 1. "Eye of the Tiger" Released: May 1982; 2. "American Heartbeat" Released: September 1982; 3. "The One That Really Matters" Released: January 1983

Eye of the Tiger is the third studio album by American rock band Survivor, released on June 8, 1982. It reached No. 2 on the US Billboard 200 chart.

The album features the title track, which is also the theme song of the film Rocky III. The single went to No. 1 in both the US and UK, while "American Heartbeat" reached No. 17 in the US. Both singles also made the charts in Germany.

Following the temporary disbandment of Survivor in 1989, Jimi Jamison recorded a cover of "Ever Since the World Began" for the film Lock Up.

== Reception ==
Professional ratings
Review scores
Source	Rating
AllMusic	3.5/5 stars
Record Mirror	4/5 stars

AllMusic's brief retrospective review was dismissive of the album, declaring that "nothing here really scales the same height as the title track".

== Track listing ==
All tracks are written by Jim Peterik & Frankie Sullivan except "The One That Really Matters", written by Peterik.

Side one
No.	Title	Length
1.	"Eye of the Tiger"	4:04
2.	"Feels Like Love"	4:08
3.	"Hesitation Dance"	3:52
4.	"The One That Really Matters"	3:32
5.	"I'm Not That Man Anymore"	4:49

Side two
No.	Title	Length
6.	"Children of the Night"	4:45
7.	"Ever Since the World Began"	3:48
8.	"American Heartbeat"	4:10
9.	"Silver Girl"	4:52
Total length:		38:11

== Personnel ==
Personnel taken from Eye of the Tiger liner notes.

Survivor

- Dave Bickler – lead vocals
- Frankie Sullivan – lead and rhythm guitars, acoustic 12-string guitars, backing vocals
- Jim Peterik – piano, B3 organ, electric guitar, acoustic 12-string guitar, backing vocals
- Stephan Ellis – bass
- Marc Droubay – drums

Additional musicians

- Daryl Dragon – additional keyboards, synthesizers, E-mu Emulator
- Fergie Frederiksen – backing vocals

Production

- Jim Peterik – producer, arrangements
- Frankie Sullivan – producer, arrangements
- Phil Bonanno – engineer
- Mike Clink – engineer
- Hill Brim Swimmer – assistant engineer
- Doug Sax – mastering
- Glen Christensen – back cover photography

Studios

- Recorded at Rumbo Recorders (Los Angeles, California).
- Mastered at the Mastering Lab (Hollywood, California).

== Charts ==
Chart (1982)	Peak position
Australian Albums (Kent Music Report)	26
Austrian Albums (Ö3 Austria)	6
Canada Top Albums/CDs (RPM)	4
Dutch Albums (Album Top 100)	29
Finnish Albums (The Official Finnish Charts)	10
German Albums (Offizielle Top 100)	31
Italian Albums (Musica e Dischi)	24
Japanese Albums (Oricon)	17
New Zealand Albums (RMNZ)	23
Norwegian Albums (VG-lista)	3
Swedish Albums (Sverigetopplistan)	13
UK Albums (Official Charts)	12
US Billboard 200	2

== Certifications ==
Region	Certification	Certified units/sales
Australia (ARIA)	Platinum	50,000^{^}
Canada (Music Canada)	Platinum	100,000^{^}
Hong Kong (IFPI Hong Kong)	Gold	10,000^{*}
United States (RIAA)	Platinum	1,000,000^{^}
^{*} Sales figures based on certification alone.^{^} Shipments figures based on certification alone.
