= Survivor (band) =

American rock band

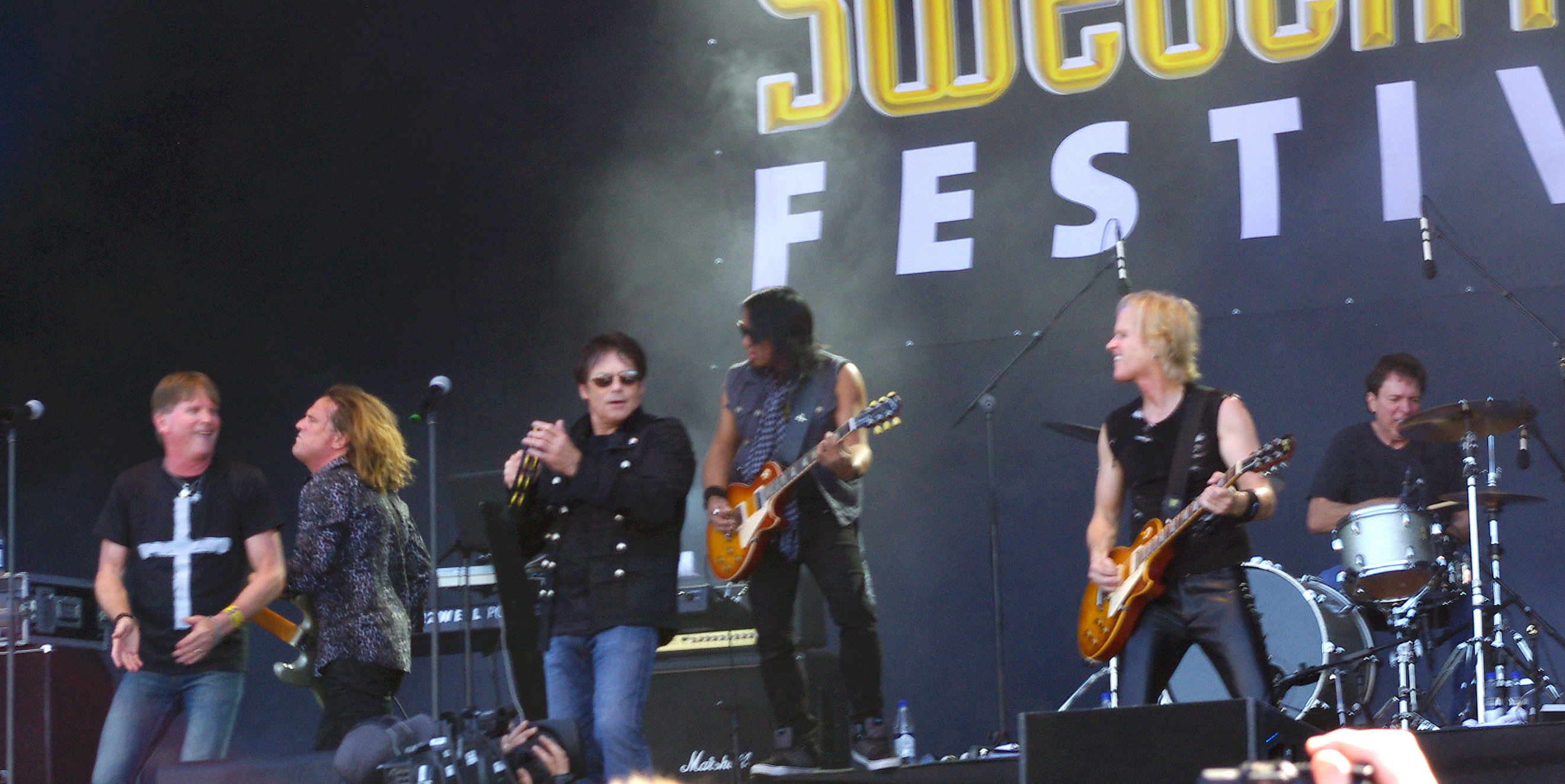
- Survivor at Sweden Rock Festival 2013

Background information
- Origin: Chicago, Illinois, U.S.
- Genres: Rock; arena rock; hard rock
- Years active: 1978–1988, 1993–2020
- Labels: Scotti Brothers, PolyGram, Frontiers
- Past members: Jim Peterik; Frankie Sullivan; Dave Bickler; Dennis Keith Johnson; Russel Carson (drums); Gary Smith; Marc Droubay; Stephan Ellis; Jimi Jamison; Bill Syniar; Kyle Woodring; Klem Hayes; Randy Riley; Billy Ozzello; Chris Grove; Gordon Patriarca; Barry Dunaway; Robin McAuley; Michael Young; Mitchell Sigman; Walter Tolentino; Cameron Barton; Ryan Sullivan; Jeffrey Bryan
- Website: survivorband.com

Survivor was an American rock band formed in Chicago in 1978 by Jim Peterik and Frankie Sullivan. The band achieved commercial success in the 1980s with five top ten singles in the United States. They are best known for their 1982 hit "Eye of the Tiger", the theme song for the film Rocky III, which spent six weeks at number one in the US.

Dave Bickler was the band's vocalist from 1978 to 1983, appearing on the band's first four albums. He left the band after a vocal injury and was replaced by Jimi Jamison in 1984. With Jamison, the band had several hits including "High on You", "The Search Is Over", "Burning Heart" and "Is This Love" before going on hiatus in 1988.

The band returned in 1993 with Bickler, but Jamison replaced him again in 2000. Their final album Reach (2006) was their first in 18 years. After the album, Jamison left the band and Robin McAuley became the singer. In 2011 Jamison returned for his third stint as vocalist. The band then toured with both Bickler and Jamison on vocals in 2013, which lasted until Jamison's death in 2014.

== Career ==
=== 1978–1981: Origins and early albums ===
Before Survivor formed, Jim Peterik was the lead vocalist–guitarist for the band The Ides of March from 1966 to 1973. Later, the Jim Peterik Band formed after Peterik had released his album Don't Fight the Feeling on Epic Records in 1976. The liner notes of the album, written by Jim Charney, refer to Peterik as a "survivor". This note inspired the name of Peterik's next grouping.

Drummer Gary Smith and bassist Dennis Keith Johnson had both been members of Bill Chase's jazz-rock fusion band Chase; Peterik had worked with Chase in 1974. One of the other inspirations for Peterik's choice of the new band's name was his narrow escape from death when he was unable to make a guest appearance at a Chase concert scheduled for Jackson, Minnesota on August 9, 1974. He ended up not being on the plane that crashed, killing Bill Chase and most of his band.

In 1978 the Jim Peterik Band had dissolved, and Jim was considering returning to singing and producing jingles. After several days of pleading with Peterik, road-manager/sound man Rick Weigand persuaded him to meet with guitarist Frankie Sullivan (ex-Mariah). Within an hour of that first meeting, the band Survivor was born. Johnson and Smith were recruited and Peterik brought in singer Dave Bickler (ex-Jamestown Massacre), who had worked with Peterik in Chicago on commercial jingles sessions.

In May of 1978 the band played the Elgin High School (Illinois) Prom at the Blue Moon Ballroom in Elgin, Illinois. When the band returned after a break, Dave Bickler was introducing the band members and said that from that point on the band would be called Survivor.

In September 1978 Survivor performed at Lyons Township High School in La Grange, Illinois. And after they played in small clubs during the rest of that year (one venue was the original My Pi pizzeria near Loyola University Chicago, where they headlined every Saturday night in the upstairs bar area), Atlantic Records A&R executive John Kalodner signed Survivor. One of Survivor's earliest performances (their second gig, according to Peterik's autobiography Through the Eye of the Tiger), at Haymakers Rock Club in Wheeling, Illinois on September 15, 1978, has appeared as a bootleg recording in trader's circles in recent years.

The group's first album, the self-titled Survivor, was recorded in 1979 and released on the Atlantic subsidiary Scotti Bros. in December 1979. The album produced no Top 40 singles ("Somewhere in America" only peaked at number 70) and did not achieve the level of success that the band had hoped for.

On Survivor's first album, Peterik played rhythm guitar. All keyboards were performed by lead singer Dave Bickler (who plays several instruments), but Peterik's role quickly became backing vocals, keyboards and co-songwriter by 1981, with some keyboard parts being performed on records by session players per the producers.

In 1981 it was decided to let Johnson and Smith go as they had schedule conflicts with their other projects and were a bit "too jazzy" in their approach, according to Peterik. They were replaced by Sullivan's friend and drummer Marc Droubay and bassist Stephan Ellis, whom Peterik and Sullivan had spotted playing in a band at Flipper's Roller Boogie Palace in the Los Angeles, CA area.

Both Droubay and Ellis came aboard in time for the recording of the band's follow-up album, Premonition (August 1981). By this time, Scotti Brothers had switched their label's distribution from Atlantic over to Columbia Records and Premonition charted higher than the debut, achieving popularity with American audiences, and gave the band its first Top 40 single, "Poor Man's Son". The album also showed off Bickler's range as a vocalist with its second single, "Summer Nights" and fan favorite non-singles, like "Heart's A Lonely Hunter", "Take You On A Saturday", "Runway Lights" and "Love Is On My Side".

During the early 80s, Peterik also co-wrote hit songs for others, including 38 Special ("Rockin' into the Night", "Hold On Loosely and "Caught Up in You").

=== 1982–1983: Eye of the Tiger and Caught in the Game ===
In 1982 Survivor's breakthrough arrived when actor Sylvester Stallone asked them to provide the theme song for his movie Rocky III. Stallone had heard "Poor Man's Son" and wanted a song similar to it and to Queen's "Another One Bites the Dust". The band agreed to his request and soon came up with "Eye of the Tiger".

The new song featured a faster tempo than "Poor Man's Son" while still incorporating the stylish, nearly identical power chords. It reached number 1 on the Billboard Hot 100 chart, remaining there for six weeks, and was in the Top 40 for a total of eighteen weeks. It also topped the British charts and was Australia's number 1 single for four weeks.

"Eye" went on to win the band the Grammy Award for Best Rock Performance by a Duo or Group with Vocal, was voted Best New Song by the People's Choice Awards and received an Academy Award nomination.

The album of the same title, Eye of the Tiger, was released by the band in June 1982 and contained another Top 40 hit in the United States, "American Heartbeat" (number 17 US) and "The One That Really Matters" (number 74 US). The album charted at number 2 in the States.

In 1983 Survivor tried to duplicate the success of Eye of the Tiger with their next release, Caught in the Game (September 1983). But this album turned out to be a commercial disappointment, stalling at number 82 on the Billboard 200 in the U.S., while the album's title track peaked at number 77.

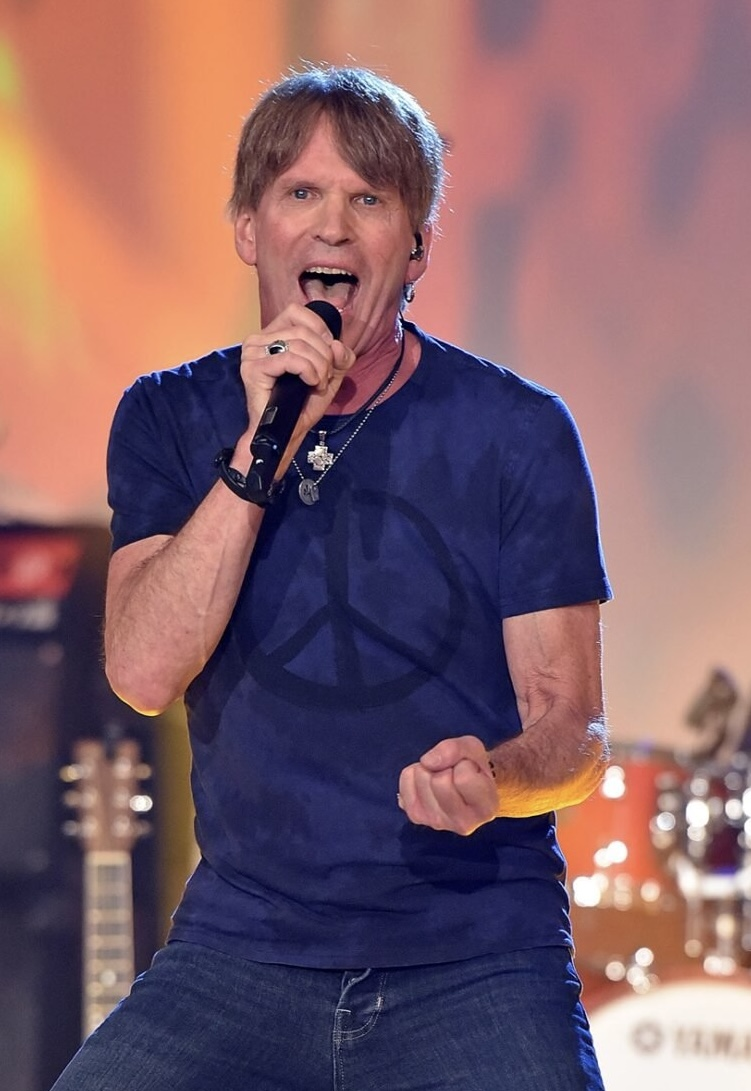
Dave Bickler in 2018 Performing on Kim Fisher presents Kulthits - Die Show mit 100 % Livemusik.

The band suffered a further setback when Dave Bickler developed vocal problems and was required to undergo an operation to remove vocal cord nodules, a very common ailment in singers. In a 2021 interview with Rock Pages, Bickler recalled this time: "Yeah, we were in the middle of this huge tour with REO Speedwagon when I had to do undergo an operation on my vocal chords. So we stopped the tour, did the surgery and then two weeks later I was back on the road, which was not recommended. It put me under a lot of pressure. So yeah, it got pretty rough."

So after finishing the tour with REO, Bickler was ordered to rest his voice for at least a year, which Peterik and Sullivan were unwilling to do. Bickler was fired and the band's record label, yet again, failed to do much in the way of promotion for Caught in the Game, a release that many feel was a superior album overall to Eye of the Tiger one year before.

In early 1984, Bickler was replaced by Jimi Jamison of the bands Target and Cobra. Jamison had been recommended to Survivor by Frank Rand from their parent company, Epic Records, who were also Cobra's label.

=== 1984–1988: Jimi Jamison era ===
The band's first song to feature Jimi Jamison was "The Moment of Truth", the theme song of the box office smash hit The Karate Kid (1984), which peaked at number 63 on the Billboard Hot 100 in June 1984. Next came Survivor's first album with Jamison, Vital Signs (August 1984), which provided the band with a massive comeback, peaking at number 16 on the Billboard Album Chart with the hits "I Can't Hold Back" (number 13 US), "High on You" (number 8 US), and "The Search Is Over" (number 4 US).

In 1985 the band went on tour with Bryan Adams, performing sold-out concerts at Nashville's War Memorial Auditorium, the Dallas Convention Center, the San Antonio Convention Center and the Lakefront Arena in New Orleans. Later that year they had another hit with "Burning Heart", a song from the Rocky IV soundtrack, which peaked at number 2 on the Billboard Hot 100 in early 1986.

When Seconds Count was released in October 1986 and included the hit "Is This Love" (number 9 U.S.). On the Billboard Album Chart the album only reached number 49 but still managed to sell over 500,000 copies and reached certified gold status.

In 1987 bassist Ellis developed a stomach ulcer requiring the band's head roadie, Rocko Reedy, to fill in on bass for a few dates. These health problems ultimately forced him out of the group. Drummer Droubay, who was becoming increasingly unhappy with the group's shift to a more pop sound, was likewise released at the end of Survivor's 1987 tour.

During pre-production of their seventh album, Too Hot to Sleep (October 1988), Ellis and Droubay were replaced by studio session veterans drummer Mickey Curry and bassist Bill Syniar, formerly of the band Tantrum. Sullivan produced the effort with Frank Filipetti. Though the album presented a harder-rocking Survivor, similar to the sound in the band's early days, Too Hot to Sleep failed to make a significant dent on the chart (only number 187 US). In a 2008 interview with Livinglegendsmusic.com, Jamison lamented that the group members weren't seeing anything close to the amount of money the band was making on tour and that a quarrel between the Scotti Brothers and their distributor, Columbia Records, most likely led to the lack of promotion of Too Hot to Sleep, leading to its failure. Three singles were released, with "Across the Miles" reaching only number 74 on the singles chart, "Didn't Know It Was Love" reaching number 61, and "Desperate Dreams" receiving promotion in Europe, but the band could not sustain the success from their previous albums.

There were, reportedly, a few live dates done by the band during this period (including a stint as opening act for Cheap Trick on the "Lap Of Luxury" Tour of North America) that included Syniar on bass and Kyle Woodring on drums.

=== 1988–2000: Hiatus, Bickler's return and legal issues ===
After the disappointing sales of Too Hot to Sleep, Jamison decided to start work on a solo album and Peterik and Sullivan decided to put the band on indefinite hiatus in the fall of 1988. A Greatest Hits compilation was released in late 1989.

Jamison's debut solo album, When Love Comes Down, was released in July 1991 and he decided to continue touring and playing Survivor songs with local musicians. Meanwhile, the Survivor rhythm section of Ellis and Droubay decided to form the group Club M.E.D. with guitarist Rod McClure, releasing the album Sampler in 1990. Peterik co-wrote "The Sound of Your Voice", "Rebel to Rebel" and "Treasure" for 38 Special's 1991 album Bone Against Steel.

In 1992 Jamison toured, now billing his band as "Survivor" or "Jimi Jamison's Survivor". After Jamison's success touring overseas that year, Sullivan contacted Jamison's management and asked to be included on the tour; he performed on eight to ten dates before leaving the group. Soon after, in late 1992 to early 1993, Survivor was tapped to make a new and more extensive hits package with two new songs. For a short time, Peterik, Sullivan and Jamison were reunited in the studio to record new material for the new package and forthcoming world tour. But after contract talks faltered, Jamison quit and went back on the road again as "Jimi Jamison's Survivor".

In early 1993, Peterik and Sullivan reunited with original lead singer Dave Bickler as Survivor and released a new Greatest Hits album with two new songs ("Hungry Years", co-written by Bickler, and "You Know Who You Are"). They embarked on a European tour, with Bill Syniar and Kyle Woodring returning on bass and drums respectively. Bassist Randy Riley then replaced Syniar later in 1993 and Klem Hayes, who had performed on the new tracks on the 1993 compilation, took over in 1994 after Riley departed.

As Jamison was also touring as Survivor, Peterik and Sullivan filed a lawsuit against their former colleague for using the name but ultimately failed (at the time) in their bid to stop Jamison from touring under the "Survivor" banner.

On November 27, 1993 guitarist Dave Carl filled in for Sullivan at a gig at Club Dimensions in Highland, Indiana after the latter injured his ribs from falling through a garage roof.

From 1993 to 1996, Peterik, Sullivan and Bickler recorded about 20 demos for a new album (which are available on the Fire Makes Steel bootleg) with Syniar and Woodring and, later, Ellis and Droubay contributing. But they failed to secure a record deal due to ongoing litigation and trademark issues with Jamison.

With Peterik and Sullivan increasingly at musical and personal odds and Sullivan attempting to move the band in more of a bluesy direction, Peterik abruptly decided to leave Survivor, playing his last show with them on July 3, 1996 at the 'Eyes To The Skies' summer fest in Lisle, Illinois.

At this juncture, Sullivan and Bickler were effectively the only remaining original members of the band. Survivor replaced Peterik with composer–keyboardist Chris Grove. Peterik returned to recording and touring with The Ides of March and also formed the group Pride of Lions.

In late 1996, bassist Stephan Ellis and drummer Marc Droubay rejoined Survivor, but Ellis left again by early 1999 and was replaced by Gordon Patriarca who only played about a half a dozen shows before new bass player Billy Ozzello was brought in. Survivor then went on to record more demos for a record deal, including "Rebel Girl '98" and the Sullivan solo album cut "Lies".

In 1999 Jamison released the album Empires under the name "Jimi Jamison's Survivor" (later re-released under his own name).

In late September 1999, Sullivan, who had brought forth another lawsuit against Jamison, won ownership of the name "Survivor", thereby ending the ongoing trademark battle.

=== 2000–2006: Bickler's departure and Jamison's return ===
In March 2000 Bickler was fired, severing the then Sullivan–Bickler Survivor and resulting in Sullivan's reestablishment of a partnership with Jamison. The band then began recording material for a new album. The Peterik–Sullivan-penned track "Velocitized" was set for inclusion on the soundtrack to the Stallone film Driven. However, it did not make the cut.

Later that year, the band threatened to sue CBS for using the name "Survivor" as the title of their hit reality show Survivor.

For 2002, they recorded "Christmas is Here" which managed to move up the Mediabase Christmas charts, reaching No. 6 as the most added holiday song at radio, and which appeared on the soundtrack A Classic Rock Christmas.

In 2003 bassist Randy Riley returned to replace Billy Ozzello.

In 2004 a Starbucks television commercial debuted for their Double Shot espresso beverage. It featured the band following a man named Glen, singing a modified version of "Eye of the Tiger" while he went about his day-to-day tasks. This commercial gained a number of fans and was nominated for an Emmy Award.

Meanwhile, original Survivor vocalist David Bickler began collaborating on the successful Bud Light beer Real Men of Genius radio ads in the late 1990s and 2000s. The Real Men of Genius ads were popular and included TV spots aired during the 2006 Super Bowl, among others. A CD package containing many of the popular commercials was recorded with Bickler, selling over 100,000 copies in its first month of release.

Bassist Stephan Ellis returned to play a few shows with the group in 2005, but Barry Dunaway played bass for most of that year. By early 2006, Billy Ozzello returned as bassist.

In April 2006 Survivor released a new album, Reach. Consisting of mostly new songs, it also included some re-recordings from the Fire Makes Steel sessions. Six of the album's songs were originally written and recorded in the 1990s with Bickler on lead vocals.

On July 14, 2006 Jamison left the band once again. Former McAuley Schenker Group singer Robin McAuley replaced him on lead vocals.

=== 2007–2020: Reunions and Jamison's death ===
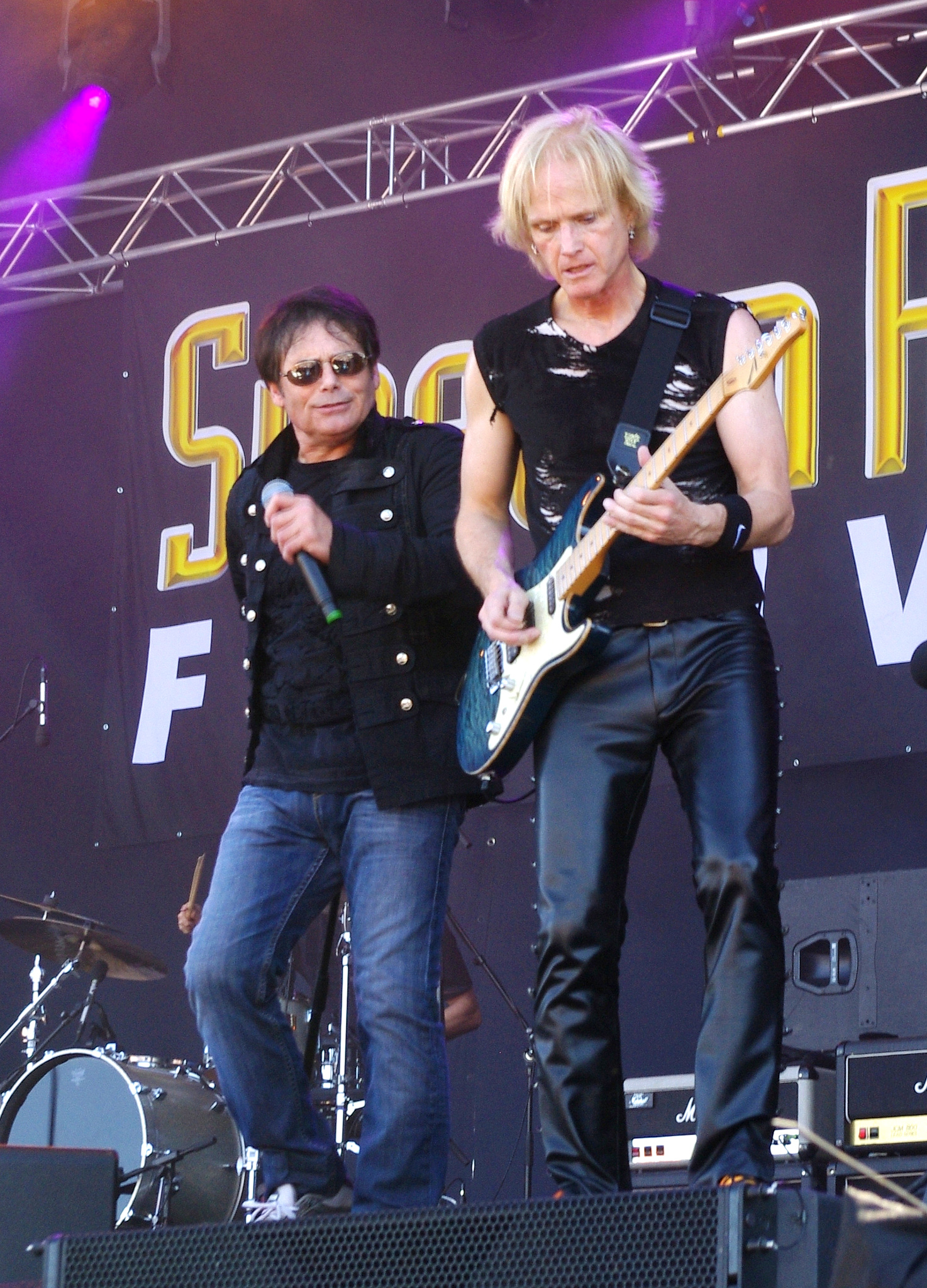
Jimi Jamison and Frankie Sullivan at the Sweden Rock Festival in 2013

The band performed "Eye of the Tiger" on ABC's Dancing with the Stars on April 3, 2007.

In 2008 Michael Young replaced Chris Grove on keyboards.

According to Sullivan, and revealed at Survivormusic.com on March 5, 2010, an album of new original music, Re-Entry, was to be released the following month, but no album was ever released. As of 2010, the lineup was a mix of old and new members: Robin McAuley (vocals), original member/songwriter Sullivan (guitar/vocals), longtime members Marc Droubay (drums) and Billy Ozzello (bass) and newcomer Mitchell Sigman (keyboards/guitar), who replaced Young. Sigman, however, was gone by 2011 and a new player, Walter Tolentino, was brought in.

Sullivan worked with the Chicago suburb melodic rock band Mecca, led by Chicago area native singer–songwriter Joe Knez Vana. Coincidentally, he replaced Peterik, who produced the first Mecca album. The album was released in late 2011 on Frontiers Records.

In 2011 Jamison returned as front man and in 2013 it was announced on the band's official media sources that Sullivan had reunited the current Survivor lineup with Bickler. "Our fans are the best and I can't think of a better way to give them our best. With this lineup, and both Dave and Jimi in the band, we can perform ALL of our hits," he said. They were also working on new material and looking forward to getting back into the studio together.

As of 2014, Frankie's son, Ryan, had taken over on drums in place of Droubay, who had to bow out due to health matters.

On September 1, 2014 Jamison died of what was believed to be a heart attack in his home in Memphis, Tennessee, at age 63. Jamison performed his last show on August 30, 2014, in Morgan Hill, California, at the CANcert benefit event during the ARTTEC Summer Concert Series. The benefit raised funds and awareness for two non-profit organizations that support cancer patients as well as career training opportunities for high school students. In November 2014 Classic Rock magazine carried a report that shed further light on the cause of Jimi's death: "Shelby County medical examiner confirms [Jamison] was suffering from cardiovascular disease and narrowing of the arteries. But the report cites the cause of death as a result of hemorrhagic brain stroke, with 'acute methamphetamine intoxication contributing.' His passing was ruled to be an accident."

In September 2015 Survivor appeared at a showcase for talent buyers down in Nashville, with new vocalist 21-year-old Cameron Barton singing alongside Dave Bickler. In March 2016 Bickler quit the band; this was announced via an edit on Survivor's Twitter page.

In late 2017, California musician/actor/composer Jeffrey Bryan (a.k.a. Jeff Fishman) joined Survivor, replacing Tolentino.

On February 28, 2019 the former Survivor bassist Stephan Ellis died. Facebook posts from family members and friends indicate that he had been ill for a while, suffering from dementia, and that he spent his final days in a hospice.

Survivor last toured in early 2020, just before the COVID-19 shutdown, and have not resumed since.

== Personnel ==
=== Members ===
- Frankie Sullivan – guitar, backing vocals (1978–1988, 1993–2020)
- Jim Peterik – keyboards (1981–1988, 1993–1996), guitar, backing vocals (1978–1988, 1993–1996)
- Dave Bickler – lead vocals (1978–1983, 1993–2000, 2014); co-lead vocals (2013–2014, 2015–2016); keyboards (1978–1981)
- Dennis Keith Johnson – bass (1978–1981)
- Gary Smith – drums (1978–1981)
- Marc Droubay – drums (1981–1987, 1996–2014)
- Stephan Ellis – bass (1981–1987, 1996–1999, fill in-2005; died 2019)
- Jimi Jamison – lead vocals (1984–1988, 2000–2006, 2011–2013); co-lead vocals (2013–2014; his death)
- Bill Syniar – bass (1988, 1993)
- Mickey Curry – drums (1988)
- Kyle Woodring – drums (1988, 1993–1996; died 2009)
- Klem Hayes – bass (1994–1996)
- Randy Riley – bass (1993, 2003–2005)
- Chris Grove – keyboards, guitar, backing vocals (1996–2008)
- Gordon Patriarca – bass (1999)
- Billy Ozzello – bass, backing vocals (1999–2003, 2006–2019)
- Barry Dunaway – bass (2005–2006)
- Robin McAuley – lead vocals (2006–2011)
- Michael Young – keyboards, guitar, backing vocals (2008–2010)
- Mitchell Sigman – keyboards, guitar, backing vocals (2010–2011)
- Rocko Reedy – bass (fill in-1987)
- Dave Carl – guitar (fill in-1993)
- Walter Tolentino – keyboards, guitar, backing vocals (2011–2017)
- Ryan Sullivan – drums (2014–2020)
- Cameron Barton – co-lead vocals (2015–2016); lead vocals (2016–2020)
- Jeffrey Bryan – keyboards, guitar, backing vocals (2017–2020)

=== Lineups ===
1978–1981	1981–1983	1984–1988	1988
Dave Bickler – lead vocals; Frankie Sullivan – guitars, backing vocals; Dennis Keith Johnson – bass; Jim Peterik – keyboards, guitar, backing vocals; Gary Smith – drums	Dave Bickler – lead vocals; Frankie Sullivan – guitar, backing vocals; Stephan Ellis – bass; Jim Peterik – keyboards, guitar, backing vocals; Marc Droubay – drums	Jimi Jamison – lead vocals; Frankie Sullivan – guitar, backing vocals; Stephan Ellis – bass; Jim Peterik – keyboards, guitar, backing vocals; Marc Droubay – drums	Jimi Jamison – lead vocals; Frankie Sullivan – guitar, backing vocals; Bill Syniar – bass; Jim Peterik – keyboards, guitar, backing vocals; Mickey Curry – drums
1988	1988–1993	1993	1993–1994
Jimi Jamison – lead vocals; Frankie Sullivan – guitar, backing vocals; Jim Peterik – keyboards, guitar, backing vocals; Bill Syniar – bass; Kyle Woodring – drums	Disbanded	Dave Bickler – lead vocals; Frankie Sullivan – guitar, backing vocals; Bill Syniar – bass; Jim Peterik – keyboards, guitar, backing vocals; Kyle Woodring – drums	Dave Bickler – lead vocals; Frankie Sullivan – guitar, backing vocals; Randy Riley – bass; Jim Peterik – keyboards, guitar, backing vocals; Kyle Woodring – drums
1994–1996	1996	1996–1999	1999
Dave Bickler – lead vocals; Frankie Sullivan – guitar, backing vocals; Klem Hayes – bass; Jim Peterik – keyboards, guitar, backing vocals; Kyle Woodring – drums	Dave Bickler – lead vocals; Frankie Sullivan – guitar, backing vocals; Klem Hayes – bass; Chris Grove – keyboards, guitar, backing vocals; Kyle Woodring – drums	Dave Bickler – lead vocals; Frankie Sullivan – guitar, backing vocals; Stephan Ellis – bass; Chris Grove – keyboards, guitar, backing vocals; Marc Droubay – drums	Dave Bickler – lead vocals; Frankie Sullivan – guitar, backing vocals; Gordon Patriarca – bass; Chris Grove – keyboards, guitar, backing vocals; Marc Droubay – drums
1999–2000	2000–2003	2003–2005	2005–2006
Dave Bickler – lead vocals; Frankie Sullivan – guitar, backing vocals; Billy Ozzello – bass, backing vocals; Chris Grove – keyboards, guitar, backing vocals; Marc Droubay – drums	Jimi Jamison – lead vocals; Frankie Sullivan – guitar, backing vocals; Billy Ozzello – bass, backing vocals; Chris Grove – keyboards, guitar, backing vocals; Marc Droubay – drums	Jimi Jamison – lead vocals; Frankie Sullivan – guitar, backing vocals; Randy Riley – bass; Chris Grove – keyboards, guitar, backing vocals; Marc Droubay – drums	Jimi Jamison – lead vocals; Frankie Sullivan – guitar, backing vocals; Barry Dunaway – bass; Chris Grove – keyboards, guitar, backing vocals; Marc Droubay – drums
2006	2006–2008	2008–2010	2010–2011
Jimi Jamison – lead vocals; Frankie Sullivan – guitar, backing vocals; Billy Ozzello – bass, backing vocals; Chris Grove – keyboards, guitar, backing vocals; Marc Droubay – drums	Robin McAuley – lead vocals; Frankie Sullivan – guitar, backing vocals; Billy Ozzello – bass, backing vocals; Chris Grove – keyboards, guitar, backing vocals; Marc Droubay – drums	Robin McAuley – lead vocals; Frankie Sullivan – guitar, backing vocals; Billy Ozzello – bass, backing vocals; Michael Young – keyboards, guitar, backing vocals; Marc Droubay – drums	Robin McAuley – lead vocals; Frankie Sullivan – guitar, backing vocals; Mitchell Sigman – keyboards, guitar, backing vocals; Billy Ozzello – bass, backing vocals; Marc Droubay – drums
2011	2011–2013	2013–2014	2014
Robin McAuley – lead vocals; Frankie Sullivan – guitar, backing vocals; Billy Ozzello – bass, backing vocals; Walter Tolentino – keyboards, guitar, backing vocals; Marc Droubay – drums	Jimi Jamison – lead vocals; Frankie Sullivan – guitar, backing vocals; Billy Ozzello – bass, backing vocals; Walter Tolentino – keyboards, guitar, backing vocals; Marc Droubay – drums	Jimi Jamison – co-lead vocals; Dave Bickler – co-lead vocals; Frankie Sullivan – guitar, backing vocals; Billy Ozzello – bass, backing vocals; Walter Tolentino – keyboards, guitar, backing vocals; Marc Droubay – drums	Jimi Jamison – co-lead vocals; Dave Bickler – co-lead vocals; Frankie Sullivan – guitar, backing vocals; Billy Ozzello – bass, backing vocals; Walter Tolentino – keyboards, guitar, backing vocals; Ryan Sullivan – drums
2014–2015	2015–2016	2016–2017	2018–2020
Dave Bickler – lead vocals; Frankie Sullivan – guitar, backing vocals; Billy Ozzello – bass, backing vocals; Walter Tolentino – keyboards, guitar, backing vocals; Ryan Sullivan – drums	Dave Bickler – co-lead vocals; Cameron Barton – co-lead vocals; Frankie Sullivan – guitar, backing vocals; Billy Ozzello – bass, backing vocals; Walter Tolentino – keyboards, guitar, backing vocals; Ryan Sullivan – drums	Cameron Barton – lead vocals; Frankie Sullivan – guitar, backing vocals; Billy Ozzello – bass, backing vocals; Walter Tolentino – keyboards, guitar, backing vocals; Ryan Sullivan – drums	Cameron Barton – lead vocals; Frankie Sullivan – guitar, backing vocals; Billy Ozzello – bass, backing vocals; Jeffrey Bryan – keyboards, guitar, backing vocals; Ryan Sullivan – drums

== Discography ==
- Survivor (1979)
- Premonition (1981)
- Eye of the Tiger (1982)
- Caught in the Game (1983)
- Vital Signs (1984)
- When Seconds Count (1986)
- Too Hot to Sleep (1988)
- Reach (2006)

== Awards and nominations ==
Grammy award

Year	Work/nominee	Award	Result
1983	“Eye of the Tiger”	Best Rock Performance by a Duo or Group with Vocal	Won

Judo award

Year	Work/nominee	Award	Result
1983	“Eye of the Tiger”	International Single of the Year	Won

People’s Choice awards

Year	Work/nominee	Award	Result
1983	“Eye of the Tiger”	Favorite New Song	Won

American Music awards

Year	Work/nominee	Award	Result
1983	“Eye of the Tiger”	Favorite Pop/Rock Song	Nominated

Brit awards

Year	Work/nominee	Award	Result
1983	“Eye of the Tiger”	Song of the Year	Nominated

Other

The song “Eye of the Tiger” was also nominated for Grammy Award for Song of the Year in 1983 along with Best Original Song at the 55th Academy Awards. However these nominations aren’t credited towards the whole band, only the two that wrote the song - Frankie Sullivan and Jim Peterik.

== See also ==
- American rock
- Music of the United States
- List of best-selling music artists
