= Frankie Sullivan =

American guitarist (born 1955)

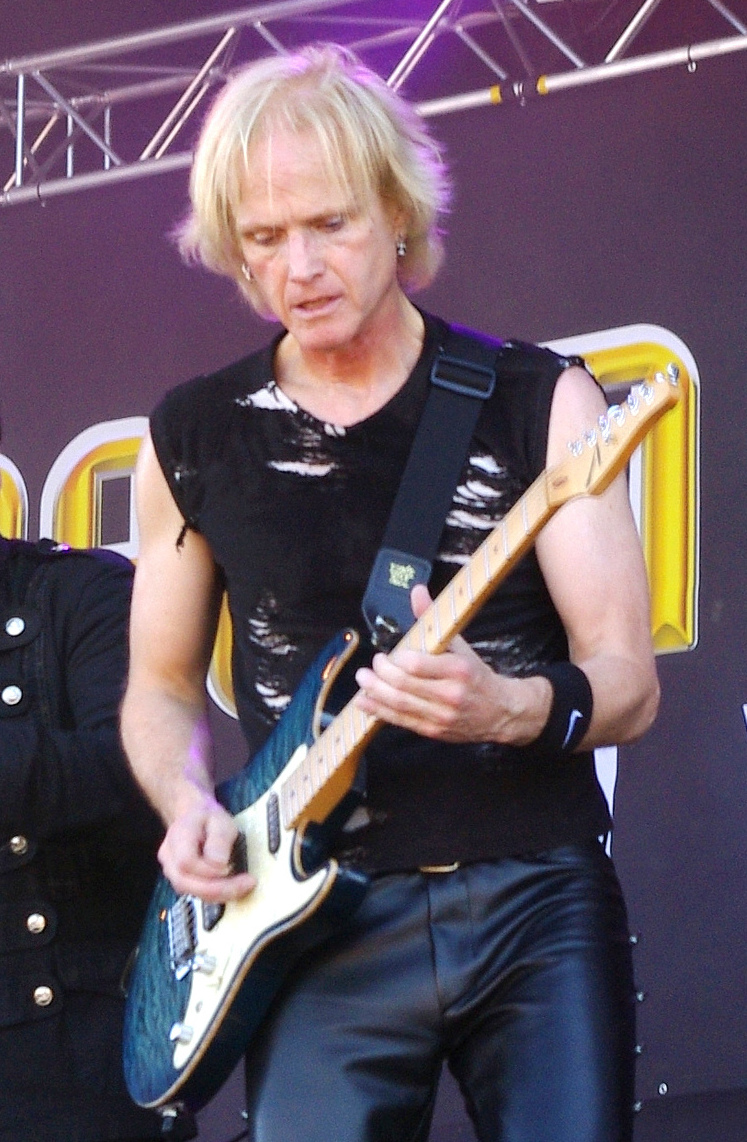
- Sullivan at Sweden Rock Festival 2013

Background information
- Born: February 1, 1955 (age 70); Chicago, Illinois, U.S.
- Occupation(s): Musician, songwriter
- Instrument: Guitar
- Years active: 1976–present
- Formerly of: Survivor
- Website: frankiesullivan.com

Signature
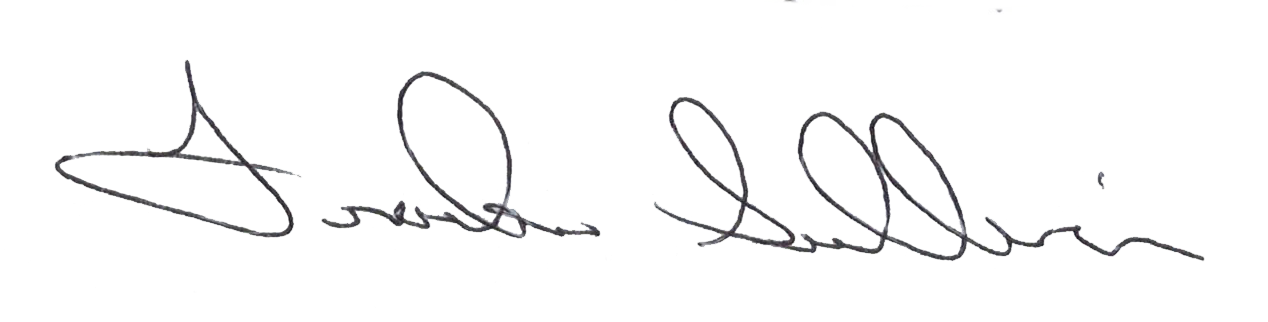

Frankie Sullivan (born February 1, 1955) is an American guitarist, best known for being a founding member of the rock band Survivor. He was the only permanent fixture in its lineup from the band's 1978 inception until disbanding in 2020.

== Early life ==
According to pianist and keyboardist Jimmy Tranchitella of Northlake, Illinois, Sullivan's musical career began in his early teens. He enjoyed sports and started running when he was 17; he became a lifelong runner.

== Career ==
In 1976, Sullivan was a member of the Chicago-based hard rock band Mariah.

In 1978, he partnered with Jim Peterik and the two became a successful songwriting team. With Sullivan as the lead guitarist, he and Peterik formed the nucleus of the band Survivor and the band began touring, playing concerts in clubs. Sullivan's first hit on the Billboard charts was in 1981 with the song "Poor Man's Son", from the album Premonition. Along with keyboardist Jim Peterik, Sullivan co-wrote all of the group's hits, including "Eye of the Tiger" and "Burning Heart" from the Rocky III and IV movie soundtracks. He credits Sylvester Stallone for giving him the "opportunity of a lifetime" by using his song "Eye of the Tiger" in the Rocky III movie.

In 1984, Sullivan and the band Survivor had a song on the movie soundtrack for The Karate Kid. The song was "The Moment of Truth".

In 1999, Sullivan was featured on the VH1 television show, Where are They Now. His son Ryan, also performs with the group.

== Discography ==
=== With Survivor ===
- Survivor (1979)
- Premonition (1981)
- Eye of the Tiger (1982)
- Caught in the Game (1983)
- Vital Signs (1984)
- When Seconds Count (1986)
- Too Hot to Sleep (1988)
- Reach (2006)

=== Live albums ===
- Live in Tokyo (1985)
- Extended Versions: The Encore Collection (2004)

=== Compilation albums ===
- The Very Best of Survivor (1986)
- Greatest Hits (1989)
- Prime Cuts: The Classic Tracks (1998)
- Survivor Special Selection (2000)
- Fire in Your Eyes: Greatest Hits (2000)
- Ultimate Survivor (2004)
- The Best of Survivor (2006)
- Playlist: The Very Best of Survivor (2009)
- The Essential Survivor (2014)

=== Unofficial albums ===
- Fire Makes Steel: The Demos (1996)
