= Eye of the Tiger =

1982 single by Survivor

Single by Survivor

from the album Rocky III and Eye of the Tiger
- B-side: "Take You on a Saturday"
- Released: May 1982
- Recorded: 1982
- Studio: Rumbo Recorders (Los Angeles, California)
- Genre: Hard rock
- Length: 4:04 (album version); 3:45 (single version)
- Label: EMI; Scotti Brothers
- Songwriters: Frankie Sullivan; Jim Peterik
- Producers: Frankie Sullivan; Jim Peterik

Survivor singles chronology
"Poor Man's Son" (1981)	"Eye of the Tiger" (1982)	"American Heartbeat" (1982)

Audio sample
- file; help

Music video
- Eye of the Tiger on YouTube

"Eye of the Tiger" is a song by the American rock band Survivor. It was written by Frankie Sullivan and Jim Peterik as the theme song for the 1982 film Rocky III and released that May as a single from Survivor's third album, Eye of the Tiger. It combines hard rock with a post-disco beat.

Sylvester Stallone, the director and star of Rocky III, enlisted Survivor after Queen denied him permission to use their song "Another One Bites the Dust". Survivor derived lyrics and title from dialogue in the film, and conceived a riff with chord changes to match the punches in the boxing scenes.

"Eye of the Tiger" reached number one on the charts of many countries. In the US, it was number one on the Billboard Hot 100 chart for six weeks, spent 15 consecutive weeks in the top 10, and was the second-bestselling single of 1982. It was certified double platinum in August 1982, for sales of two million copies. In the UK, it sold 956,000 copies and was number one on the UK singles chart for four consecutive weeks.

At the 25th Annual Grammy Awards, "Eye of the Tiger" won Best Rock Performance by Duo or Group with Vocal and was nominated for Song of the Year. At the 55th Academy Awards, it was nominated for Best Original Song. It has been used without authorization in several Republican campaigns, which Survivor opposed.

== Writing ==
By 1982, the American band Survivor had released two unsuccessful albums and were concerned they would be dropped by their record label. That year, the director and actor Sylvester Stallone enlisted them to write a song for his film Rocky III, after Queen denied him permission to use "Another One Bites the Dust". Stallone asked for "something street" with a pulse to match the punches of the boxing scenes. He sent them a copy of the montage used in the film's introduction, depicting the boxer Rocky Balboa and the ascent of his rival, Clubber Lang.

"Eye of the Tiger" was written by the guitarist, Frankie Sullivan, and the keyboardist, Jim Peterik. They conceived a riff based on chord changes to mirror the timing of punches. The title was taken from a line spoken by the Rocky character Apollo Creed: "You had that eye of the tiger, man, the edge ... You gotta get it back." Stallone took the phrase from the 1969 film A Dream of Kings.

Survivor initially planned to title the song "Survival", and had the chorus: "Rising up to the spirit of our rival / And the last known survivor stalks his prey in the night / And it all comes down to survival", with "survival" rhyming with "rival". They changed it as they felt the "eye of the tiger" hook was stronger and did not have to rhyme perfectly.

Survivor recorded a demo at the Chicago Recording Company on February 1, 1982. Sullivan was so destitute that he used a guitar with a broken headstock he had glued back together. The band attempted to capture a drum sound similar to that of the Led Zeppelin drummer, John Bonham. Stallone loved the demo and insisted on using it in the film. Survivor rerecorded it for the album and single releases. It combines hard rock with a post-disco beat.

== Release ==
"Eye of the Tiger" was played extensively on MTV and radio, and topped charts worldwide during 1982. In the US, it was number one on the Billboard Hot 100 chart for six weeks. In August 1982, it was certified double platinum in the US for sales of two million copies. "Eye of the Tiger" sold 956,000 copies in the UK and was number one on the UK singles chart for four weeks. It was the UK's third-best-selling single in 1982. By February 2015, It had sold more than 4.1 million in downloads in the US. Sullivan felt people related to the message of self-empowerment: "It's about getting your ass out of bed. It's about saying: 'I'm not going to try to go to the gym Monday – I am going to go to the gym Monday.'"

At the 25th Annual Grammy Awards, "Eye of the Tiger" won Best Rock Performance by Duo or Group with Vocal and was nominated for Song of the Year, but lost to "Always on My Mind" by Willie Nelson. At the 55th Academy Awards, it was nominated for Best Original Song (the only nomination for Rocky III), but lost to "Up Where We Belong" from An Officer and a Gentleman. The music video depicts the band members walking through city streets and an industrial warehouse. In May 2024, it reached one billion views on YouTube.

In 2026, Alex Hopper of American Songwriter wrote: "No song has become more synonymous with perseverance ... This hit is sportsmanship incarnate. Even without the iconic movie to bolster its standing, this song carries with it an innate sense of pride and determination."

== Use in political campaigns ==
In 2012, Survivor sued the Republican presidential candidate Newt Gingrich in Illinois federal court for using "Eye of the Tiger" without authorization as entrance music at his political rallies. The lawsuit was settled out of court. In the same year, another Republican candidate, Mitt Romney, agreed to stop using "Eye of the Tiger" at his rallies. In 2016, the Republican candidate Mike Huckabee agreed to pay $25,000 in compensation for using "Eye of the Tiger" at a rally without permission.

== Awards and nominations ==
Year	Award	Category	Result
1983	Grammy Awards	Best Rock Performance by a Duo or Group with Vocal	Won
1983	Grammy Awards	Song of the Year	Nominated
1983	Juno Awards	Best International Single	Won
1983	People’s Choice Awards	Favorite New Song	Won
1983	American Music Awards	American Music Award for Best Pop Song	Nominated
1983	Brit Awards	Song of the Year	Nominated
1983	Academy Awards	Best Original Song	Nominated
1983	Golden Globes	Best Original Song	Nominated
1983	British Academy Film Awards	Best Original Song	Nominated

== Credits and personnel ==
Credits adapted from the album Eye of the Tiger.

- Dave Bickler – vocals
- Frankie Sullivan – guitar
- Jim Peterik – piano, keyboards
- Stephan Ellis – bass
- Marc Droubay – drums

== Charts ==
=== Weekly charts ===
Chart (1982–2025)	Peak position
Australia (Kent Music Report)	1
Austria (Ö3 Austria Top 40)	2
Belgium (Ultratop 50 Flanders)	3
Canada Top Singles (RPM)	1
Canada (Hot Canadian Digital Singles)	43
Denmark (IFPI)	8
Finland (Suomen virallinen lista)	1
France (IFOP)	3
France (SNEP)	2
Germany (GfK)	13
Hungary (Single Top 40)	8
Iceland (Dagblaðið Vísir)	1
Ireland (IRMA)	1
Italy (Musica e Dischi)	3
Japan (Oricon International Chart)	1
Japan (Oricon Singles Chart)	10
Netherlands (Dutch Top 40)	2
Netherlands (Single Top 100)	6
New Zealand (Recorded Music NZ)	4
Norway (VG-lista)	1
Poland (Polish Airplay Top 100)	50
South Africa (Springbok Radio)	1
Slovenia (SloTop50)	28
Spain (AFYVE)	5
Sweden (Sverigetopplistan)	5
Switzerland (Schweizer Hitparade)	6
UK Singles (Official Charts)	1
US Billboard Adult Contemporary	27
US Billboard Hot 100	1
US Billboard Hot Dance Club Play	59
US Billboard Hot Digital Songs	64
US Billboard Hot Ringtones	9
US Billboard Top Tracks	1
US Cash Box Top 100	1

Year	Chart	Peak position
2007	Ireland (IRMA)	8
2007	Switzerland (Schweizer Hitparade)	80
2007	UK Singles (Official Charts)	47
2008	Switzerland (Schweizer Hitparade)	83
2009	Switzerland (Schweizer Hitparade)	77
2010	Sweden (Sverigetopplistan)	50
2011	France (SNEP)	62
2012	France (SNEP)	162
2013	Austria (Ö3 Austria Top 40)	74
2013	Germany (GfK)	95
2013	Switzerland (Schweizer Hitparade)	72
2013	UK Singles (Official Charts)	65
2015	Switzerland (Schweizer Hitparade)	66

=== Year-end charts ===
Chart (1982)	Rank
Australia (Kent Music Report)	1
Austria (Ö3 Austria Top 40)	18
Belgium (Ultratop 50 Flanders)	28
Canada Top Singles (RPM)	2
Netherlands (Dutch Top 40)	27
Netherlands (Single Top 100)	39
New Zealand (Recorded Music NZ)	30
South Africa (Springbok Radio)	2
UK Singles (Official Charts Company)	3
US Billboard Hot 100	2
US Cash Box Top 100	1

Chart (1983)	Rank
France (IFOP)	11

=== All-time charts ===
Chart (1958–2018)	Position
US Billboard Hot 100	26

== Certifications ==
Region	Certification	Certified units/sales
Australia (ARIA)	Platinum	100,000^{^}
Canada (Music Canada)	2× Platinum	200,000^{^}
Denmark (IFPI Danmark)	2× Platinum	180,000^{‡}
France (SNEP)	Gold	500,000^{*}
Germany (BVMI)	2× Platinum	1,200,000^{‡}
Italy (FIMI)	2× Platinum	100,000^{‡}
Japan (RIAJ) Digital	Gold	100,000^{*}
Mexico (AMPROFON)	Gold	30,000^{*}
New Zealand (RMNZ)	5× Platinum	150,000^{‡}
Spain (Promusicae)	2× Platinum	120,000^{‡}
United Kingdom (BPI)	4× Platinum	2,400,000^{‡}
United States (RIAA) Digital	8× Platinum	8,000,000^{‡}
United States (RIAA) Mastertone	Gold	500,000^{*}
United States (RIAA) Physical single	2× Platinum	2,000,000^{^}
^{*} Sales figures based on certification alone.^{^} Shipments figures based on certification alone.^{‡} Sales+streaming figures based on certification alone.

== See also ==
- List of number-one singles in Australia during the 1980s
- List of Top 25 singles for 1982 in Australia
- List of Billboard Hot 100 number-one singles of 1982
- List of Billboard Mainstream Rock number-one songs of the 1980s
- List of Cash Box Top 100 number-one singles of 1982
- List of number-one singles of 1982 (Canada)
- List of number-one singles of 1982 (Ireland)
- List of number-one songs in Norway
- List of UK Singles Chart number ones of the 1980s
