= Jim Peterik =

American rock musician and songwriter (born 1950)

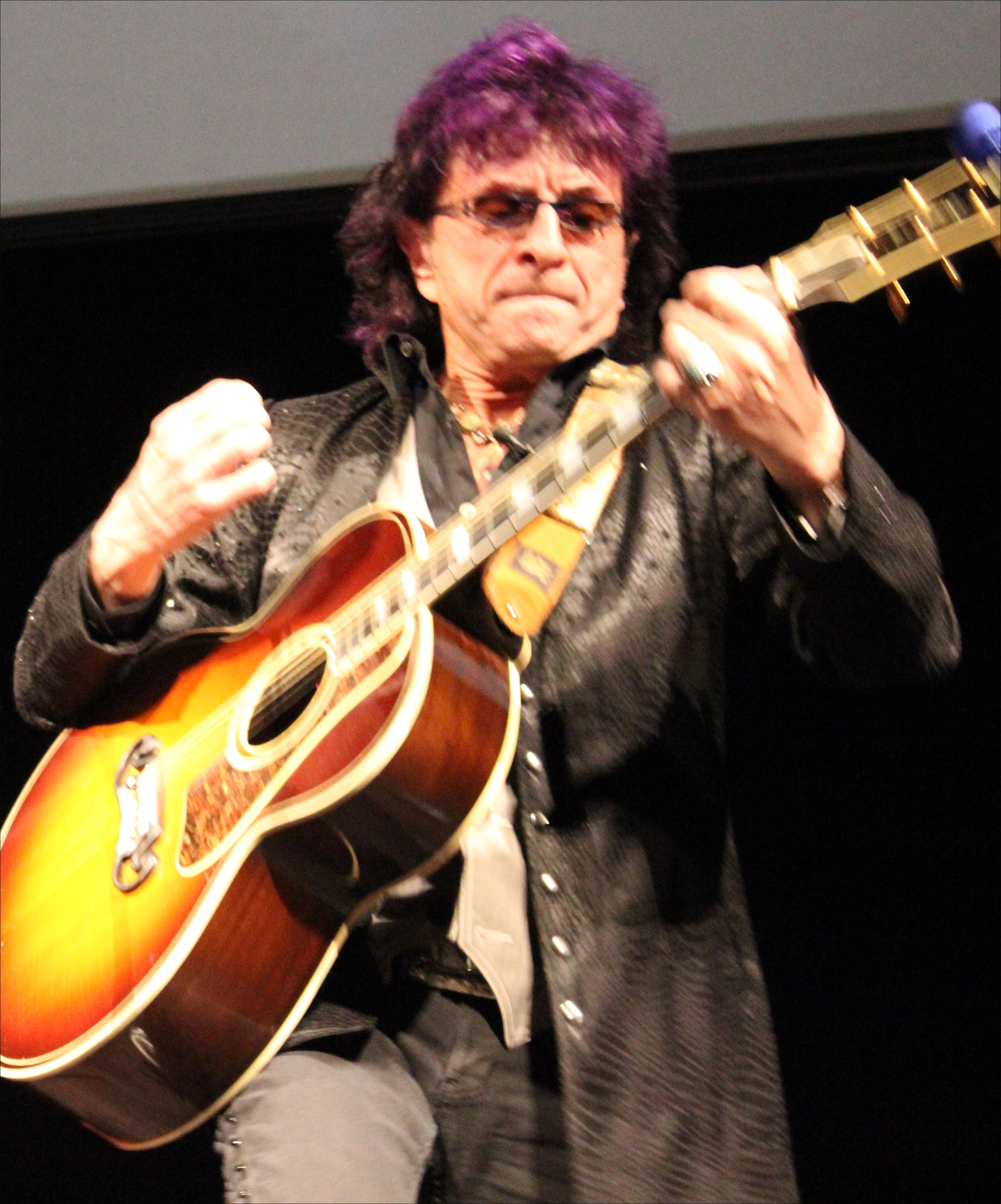
- Peterik performs at an American Society of News Editors convention session in Washington, D.C., April 2012

Background information
- Born: James Michael Peterik; November 11, 1950 (age 75); Berwyn, Illinois, U.S.
- Genres: Hard rock, AOR, smooth jazz
- Occupations: Musician, songwriter
- Instruments: Vocals, guitar, keyboards, ukulele
- Years active: 1964–present
- Member of: The Ides of March, Pride of Lions
- Formerly of: Survivor
- Website: jimpeterik.com

James Michael Peterik (/ˈpiːtərɪk/ PEE-tə-rik; born November 11, 1950) is an American musician and songwriter. He is best known as the founder of the rock band Survivor, as vocalist and guitarist in The Ides of March, and as co-writer of the anthem "Eye of the Tiger", the theme from the 1982 film Rocky III.

Peterik has co-written songs for 38 Special ("Rockin' into the Night", "Wild-Eyed Southern Boys", "Hold On Loosely and "Caught Up in You"), Lynyrd Skynyrd, Blackhawk, Cheap Trick, Sammy Hagar ("Heavy Metal"), Cathy Richardson, Dennis DeYoung, Van Zant, Brian Wilson, REO Speedwagon and The Beach Boys. He is currently fronting the band Pride of Lions, and the smooth jazz project Jim Peterik's Lifeforce. He has a regular series of yearly concert performances with an all-star cast as World Stage. He is also active as a producer and mentor to young, developing talent.

== Career ==
=== The Ides of March and early years ===
Peterik started performing in 1964 with some of his schoolmates in Berwyn, Illinois, as The Ides of March. Their hits included "You Wouldn't Listen", "Vehicle", and "L.A. Goodbye" in the late 1960s and early 1970s. "Vehicle", which was number 2 on the Billboard Hot 100 chart the week of May 23, 1970, is purported to be the fastest selling single in Warner Bros. Records history at the time.

Peterik graduated from Morton West High School in 1968 and Morton Junior College in 1970, and attended college classes while "Vehicle" became a national hit.

In the early 1970s Peterik wrote several songs recorded by the jazz-rock band Chase and performed on their 1974 album Pure Music. In 1976 he released a solo album, Don't Fight the Feeling, and toured as the Jim Peterik Band with Bruce Gaitsch (guitar), Terry Fryer (keyboards), and Chase's rhythm section of Dennis Keith Johnson (bass) and Gary Smith (drums). They toured with several of the era's most popular bands, including Heart and Boston.

=== Survivor ===
In 1978, the Jim Peterik Band had broken up and Peterik was considering going back to singing and producing jingles. After several days of pleading with Peterik, road manager/sound man Rick Weigand persuaded him to meet with guitarist Frankie Sullivan. Within an hour of that first meeting, the band Survivor was born.

In the early years of Survivor, Peterik continued to co-write hits for other artists, including 38 Special and Sammy Hagar. In 1982, Sylvester Stallone commissioned Survivor to write and perform the theme song for Rocky III. This song, "Eye of the Tiger", became their defining single, spending six weeks at No. 1 on the Billboard Hot 100 and going double platinum. "Eye of the Tiger" also won a Grammy Award and resulted in an Oscar nomination for Peterik and Frankie Sullivan for Best Song.

Their 1984 album, Vital Signs, featured the Top 10 hits "High on You" (No. 8) and "The Search Is Over" (No. 4), and another sizable hit, "I Can't Hold Back" (No. 13). In 1985, Peterik co-wrote the theme song to Rocky IV, "Burning Heart", which would be another big hit (No. 2 in early 1986) for Survivor. "Burning Heart" was followed by Number 7 hit, "Is This Love".

Following Survivor's 1988 album Too Hot to Sleep, the group disbanded.

Songs from each of Peterik's bands appear in Stallone films to motivate the scene's action: Survivor's "Eye of the Tiger" in Rocky III, the Ides of March's "Vehicle" in Lock Up, and Jimi Jamison's solo take on Survivor's "Ever Since the World Began" playing during the closing credits of Lock Up.

In 1993, Peterik once again began touring and recording with a reunited Survivor, but left them for good in July 1996.

In 1994 Peterik wrote a song, ”Space and Time", with John Wetton of Asia, for his solo album BattleZone.

=== Later years ===
In 1990, the original members of the Ides of March (Peterik, Millas, Bob Bergland, Mike Borch, Chuck Soumar, and John Larson) reunited, adding new members Scott May and Dave Stahlberg. This lineup continues to perform. Peterik continues to write for other artists such as the Doobie Brothers and Cheap Trick.

In 2001, Peterik produced and co-wrote the first album by AOR group Mecca with his longtime friend Joe Vana.

In 2003, he founded Pride of Lions with Toby Hitchcock. The group, according to Peterik is "my vision of the best elements of the great melodic rock era of the 80s, updated of course with more modern production sounds." Peterik continues to play with the Ides of March. As well, a solo CD, Above the Storm, was released in 2006.

"Vehicle" found new popularity when it was performed by American Idol runner-up Bo Bice in 2005.

Peterik performed at the West Australian Music Industry Awards with shred virtuoso Michael Angelo Batio in 2005.

In 2009, Peterik appeared on The Jerry Springer Show as guest security.

In 2010, Peterik backed up the Louisiana State University Tiger Marching Band in their final halftime show of the season, at the LSU vs. Ole Miss game.

In April 2011, Peterik played a sold-out run of eight nights at the Pioneer Place Theater as a special guest of the Fabulous Armadillos in St. Cloud, Minnesota. In October 2011, he returned with the Fabulous Armadillos for a sold-out night at the Paramount Theatre, St. Cloud, Minnesota.

Peterik also develops and produces new talent on his own label, World Stage International. Current artists, aside from Lifeforce, include Marc Scherer, Hunter Cook, and the trio Ariel, Zoey & Eli. Past artists include Lisa McClowry and Mallory Lennon. World Stage has two recording studios, engineered by the Ides of March co-founder and Peterik's childhood friend, Larry Millas.

In 2012, Peterik co-wrote and made an appearance on the Beach Boys' reunion album, That's Why God Made the Radio. He previously worked with Beach Boys founder Brian Wilson on Wilson's 1998 solo album, Imagination.

In 2014, Peterik released his autobiography, Through The Eye Of The Tiger, co-written with Lisa Torem, on BenBella Books, and traveled internationally to sign books on tour.

In 2016, Peterik released The Songs, an album of some of his biggest songs, re-arranged as acoustic/roots versions. The album was produced by Fred Mollin and was recorded both in Nashville, TN and at his home studio in Illinois.

On May 5, 2019, he appeared on MeTV's Collector's Call with Lisa Whelchel, showing off part of his collection of 193 guitars.

Peterik resides in Western Springs, Illinois. As part of the World Stage project, he produced Tigress Women Who Rock The World, an album highlighting young female rock musicians. It was released in 2021.

== Discography ==
=== Solo ===
- Don't Fight the Feeling (1976)
- Above the Storm (2006)
- The Songs (2016)

=== with Chase ===
- "Boys and Girls Together" (1971)
- "Love Is on the Way" (1974)
- "Run Back to Mama" (1974)
- "Pure Music" (1974) (unreleased)

=== with The Ides of March ===
- Vehicle (1970)
- Common Bond (1971)
- World Woven (1972)
- Midnight Oil (1973)
- Still 19 (2010)
- Last Band Standing (box set) (2015)
- Outside the Box (select tracks from Last Band Standing) (2016)
- Play On (2019)

=== with Henry Paul Band ===
- Feel the Heat (1980)
- Anytime (1981)

=== with Survivor ===
- Survivor (1979)
- Premonition (1981)
- Eye of the Tiger (1982)
- Caught in the Game (1983)
- Vital Signs (1984)
- When Seconds Count (1986)
- Too Hot to Sleep (1988)

=== with World Stage ===
- Jim Peterik and World Stage (2000)
- Rock America: Smash Hits Live (2002)
- Winds of Change (2019)
- Tigress – Women Who Rock the World (2021)

=== with Kelly Keagy ===
- Time Passes (2001)
- I'm Alive (2007)

=== with Pride of Lions ===
- Pride of Lions (2003)
- Sound of Home (2003)
- Black Ribbons (Voices of the World) (2003)
- The Destiny Stone (2004)
- Live in Belgium (2006)
- The Roaring of Dreams (2007)
- Immortal (2012)
- Fearless (2017)
- Lion Heart (2020)
- Dream Higher (2023)
- Unbridled (2026)

=== with Jim Peterik's Lifeforce ===
- Lifeforce (2009)
- Forces at Play (2011)

=== with Jimi Jamison ===
- Crossroads Moment (2008)
- Extra Moments (2010)

=== with Marc Scherer ===
- Risk Everything (2015)

=== with Dennis DeYoung ===
- 26 East, Vol. 1 (2020)
- 26 East, Vol. 2 (2021)

=== with Marc Scherer and Jennifer Batten as Scherer/Batten ===
- BattleZone (2017)

== Books ==
Peterik co-authored Songwriting for Dummies, published 2002, with Dave Austin and Mary Ellen Bickford. His autobiography, Through the Eye of the Tiger, co-written with Lisa Torem, was released by BenBella Books in September 2014.
