= Scotti Brothers Records discography =

The following is a list of albums released by defunct record label Scotti Brothers Records, as well as its subsidiary labels Rock 'n Roll Records and Street Life Records.

== 1970s ==
=== 1978 ===
- Leif Garrett — Feel the Need

=== 1979 ===
- Addrisi Brothers — Ghost Dancer
- Leif Garrett — Same Goes for You
- Ironhorse — Ironhorse
- Ian Lloyd — Goose Bumps
- Survivor — Survivor

== 1980s ==
=== 1980 ===
- Leif Garrett — Can't Explain
- Ironhorse — Everything is Grey
- Fred Knobloch — Why Not Me
- Ian Lloyd — 3WC*

=== 1981 ===
- Susan Anton — Foxy
- Susan Anton — Killin' Time
- Claudia — Claudia
- Leif Garrett — My Movie Of You
- Doug Kershaw — Instant Hero
- John Schneider — Now Or Never
- John Schneider — White Christmas
- Survivor — Premonition

=== 1982 ===
- The Dukes of Hazzard soundtrack
- Noel & The Red Wedge — Peer Pressure
- Nowherefast — Nowherefast
- John Schneider — Quiet Man
- Survivor — Eye of the Tiger

=== 1983 ===
- Big Ric — Big Ric (Rock 'n Roll)
- John Cafferty and the Beaver Brown Band — Eddie and the Cruisers soundtrack
- Felony — The Fanatic (Rock 'n Roll)
- John Schneider — If You Believe
- The Shakin' Pyramids — The Shakin' Pyramids (Rock 'n Roll)
- Survivor — Caught in the Game
- "Weird Al" Yankovic — "Weird Al" Yankovic (Rock 'n Roll)

=== 1984 ===
- Darque — Jenny's Out Tonight (Rock 'n Roll)
- Revenge of the Nerds soundtrack
- Survivor — Vital Signs
- "Weird Al" Yankovic — "Weird Al" Yankovic in 3-D (Rock 'n Roll)
- Ya Ya — Scarred (Rock 'n Roll)

=== 1985 ===
- John Cafferty and the Beaver Brown Band — Tough All Over
- Flag — Flag
- Robert Froman — Cat Juggling
- LaMarca — LaMarca
- Jill Michaels — Jill Michaels
- Mountain — Go for Your Life
- Rocky IV soundtrack
- "Weird Al" Yankovic — Dare to Be Stupid (Rock 'n Roll)

=== 1986 ===
- James Brown — Gravity
- Cobra (soundtrack)
- Survivor — When Seconds Count
- Robert Tepper — No Easy Way Out
- The Transformers soundtrack
- "Weird Al" Yankovic — Polka Party! (Rock 'n Roll)
- The Wraith soundtrack

=== 1987 ===
- Stan Bush & Barrage — Stan Bush & Barrage
- Tim Feehan — Tim Feehan
- He's My Girl soundtrack
- Lady Beware soundtrack
- Lion — Dangerous Attraction

=== 1988 ===
- James Brown — I'm Real
- John Cafferty and the Beaver Brown Band — Roadhouse
- David Hallyday — True Cool
- Rambo III soundtrack
- Roxanne — Roxanne
- Robert Tepper — Modern Madness
- Survivor — Too Hot to Sleep
- "Weird Al" Yankovic — Even Worse (Rock 'n Roll)

=== 1989 ===
- James Brown & Friends — Soul Session Live
- Eddie and the Cruisers II: Eddie Lives! soundtrack
- The Funk Club — Funky And Then Some
- Gigi on the Beach — Gigi on the Beach
- Roxanne — Burning Through the Night
- "Weird Al" Yankovic — UHF – Original Motion Picture Soundtrack and Other Stuff (Rock 'n Roll)
- Work Force — Work Force

== 1990s ==
=== 1990 ===
- Another 48 Hrs. soundtrack
- ELO Part II — Electric Light Orchestra Part Two (Telstar)
- David Hallyday — Rock 'n' Heart
- The Northern Pikes — Snow in June
- Tommy Puett — Life Goes On

=== 1991 ===
- James Brown — Love Over-Due
- Carl King — Bandits
- Cartouche — House Music All Night Long
- Dread Filmstone and the Modern Tone Age Family — From the Ghetto
- Jimi Jamison — When Love Comes Down
- The Nylons — 4 On the Floor (Live in Concert)
- Tag — Contagious
- Soap Opera's Greatest Love Themes - Volume I

=== 1992 ===
- Colonel Abrams — About Romance
- AZ-1 — AZ-1
- Blackbird — Blackbird
- John Cafferty and the Beaver Brown Band — Eddie and the Cruisers: Live and in Concert
- David Cassidy — Didn't You Used to Be...
- Cell Mates — Between Two Fires
- David Hallyday — On the Road
- May May — The Introduction
- Mother's Finest — Black Radio Won't Play This Record
- Naked Soul — Seed
- The Nylons — Live to Love
- "Weird Al" Yankovic — Off the Deep End (Rock 'n Roll)
- Soap Opera's Greatest Love Themes - Volume II

=== 1993 ===
- James Brown — Universal James
- Michael Damian — Reach Out to Me
- Fabio — Fabio After Dark
- G-Wiz — Naughty Bits
- Trevor Jones — Cliffhanger soundtrack
- Lost City — Watching You
- Naked Soul — Visiting Your Planet
- Spark 950 & Timbo King — United We Slam (Street Life)
- Truck Stop Love — Truck Stop Love (Backyard)
- "Weird Al" Yankovic — Alapalooza (Rock 'n Roll)
- F.O.S. - Big Black Boots

=== 1994 ===
- 12 Gauge — 12 Gauge (Street Life)
- Gerald Alston — First Class Only
- Blind Fish & David Hallyday — 2000 Bdf
- Kolorz — Kolorz
- The Nylons — Because...
- Sweet Sable — Old Times' Sake (Street Life)
- Young Dubliners — Rocky Road (Backyard)
- Soap Opera's Greatest Love Themes - Volume III

=== 1995 ===
- 12 Gauge — Let Me Ride Again (Street Life)
- Alfonzo Blackwell — Let's Imagine... (Street Life)
- Black 9 — Black 9 (Mix It Up)
- Breakdown — Ain't Nuttin' But Bass
- James Brown — Live at the Apollo 1995
- Gold Teet — The Heat is On (Street Life)
- Freddie Jackson — Private Party (Street Life)
- Tina Moore — Tina Moore (RCA)
- Nais — Str-8 from Da' Boot (Street Life)
- Never Talk to Strangers
- Shiro — Can We Talk (Street Life)
- Skee-Lo — I Wish (Sunshine)
- Truck Stop Love — How I Spent My Summer Vacation (Backyard)
- Young Dubliners — Breathe (Backyard)

=== 1996 ===
- Big Bully soundtrack
- DJ Yella — One Mo Nigga ta Go (Street Life)
- The Nylons — Run for Cover
- "Weird Al" Yankovic — Bad Hair Day

=== 1997 ===
- Artie The-1-Man Party — Levante Las Manos
- Chris Thomas King — Chris Thomas King
