= Rebel Girl (Survivor song) =

1980 single by Survivor

Single by Survivor
- Released: 1980
- Recorded: 1980
- Studio: Pumpkin Studios
- Genre: Rock
- Length: 3:49
- Label: Scotti Bros.
- Songwriters: Jim Peterik; Gary Smith
- Producers: Ron Nevison; Barry Mraz

Survivor singles chronology
"Somewhere in America" (1980)	"Rebel Girl" (1980)	"Summer Nights" (1981)

"Rebel Girl" is a song by American rock band Survivor. It was recorded and released in 1980, about a year after the sessions of their debut studio album Survivor. The 2010 reissue on Rock Candy Records adds the song as a bonus track.

== Background ==
Gary Smith had suggested the title "Rebel Girls" for the song, while Frankie Sullivan changed it to singular form. Jim Peterik convinced the band to learn it as a potential key song for their next album. Not long after they wrote the song, Survivor performed it during their opening act for rock band Starship at a concert in Springfield, Missouri. After their performance, they were approached by a promo man from Atlantic Records who complimented the song and asked why it was not on their album. Peterik told him it would be on their next album.

The next day, Tony Scotti called Peterik, telling him to record the song in the studio on the following day and that he intended to re-release their debut album and add the song on it. Two days later, Survivor recorded the song at Pumpkin Studios; Peterik originally sang the verses as he thought it was too low for Dave Bickler, but Bickler sang on the final version at Sullivan's suggestion. They sent the track to Tony and Ben Scotti, who thought it needed further work in production and editing and flew the band to Los Angeles to work with Australian musician Robie Porter. During the editing process of the song, Porter assigned Sullivan on extra leads and had Bickler rasp the screaming high notes that led into the chorus. When they finished the track, it had a duration of 2:35.

"Rebel Girl" received radio play, including in Chicago and Detroit. Scotti Brothers Records planned to re-press Survivor to include the song, but they were in the process of changing their record distributor from Atlantic to Epic Records, so the plan was abandoned. The song was also not as successful as expected. However, it was included in the Japanese release of the album and the compilation album Ultimate Survivor (2004), being remastered for the latter.

== Charts ==
Chart (1980)	Peak position
US Billboard Hot 100	103
