= Eye of the Tiger (film) =

1986 film by Richard C. Sarafian

- Theatrical release poster
- Directed by: Richard C. Sarafian
- Written by: Michael Thomas Montgomery
- Produced by: Tony Scotti
- Starring: Gary Busey; Yaphet Kotto; Seymour Cassel; William Smith; Judith Barsi; Bert Remsen; Denise Galik
- Cinematography: Peter Lyons Collister
- Edited by: Gregory Prange
- Music by: Don Preston
- Production company: Scotti Brothers Pictures
- Distributed by: Scotti Brothers Pictures
- Release date: November 28, 1986
- Running time: 92 minutes
- Country: United States
- Language: English
- Budget: $3 million

Eye of the Tiger is a 1986 American action film directed by Richard C. Sarafian, and stars Gary Busey, Yaphet Kotto, Denise Galik, Seymour Cassel, William Smith, and Judith Barsi. Busey plays a wrongfully incarcerated ex-convict who fights back against the biker gang harassing his hometown and the crooked sheriff protecting them. The film marked the beginning of the actor's transition to the action roles that would epitomize his career for much of the late 1980s and 1990s.

== Plot summary ==
Just released from prison, Vietnam War veteran Buck Matthews returns to his small town to start his life over with his wife Christie and their five-year-old daughter Jennifer, but soon learns that it has fallen into the clutches of a motorcycle gang. On his first night back to his old job at a construction yard, Buck hears the screams of a local nurse about to get raped by several bikers. Buck manages to chase them off using his truck. The leader of the biker gang, Blade, takes Buck's actions personally and plots an attack on the Matthews' home, during which Buck is severely beaten and his wife is killed, leaving their daughter traumatized.

The local sheriff refuses to help Buck, leaving him with no other option but to take justice into his own hands. Buck then calls in a favor from Jamie, a Miami-based Colombian drug kingpin whom Buck protected from violence when they served time together. Buck receives a high tech truck, equipped with machine guns and mortars. J.B. Deveraux, a local deputy who fought alongside Buck in Vietnam, provides Buck with a history of the motorcycle gang. The sheriff is shown to be corrupt and in league with the motorcycle gang.

Buck and J.B. start whittling down Blade's gang by luring them into traps or gunning them down outright. Eventually, the bikers kidnap Buck's daughter Jennifer from the hospital, forcing Buck to go to their camp in the desert outside of town. With the help of J.B., flying a bomb-dropping crop duster airplane, Buck, successfully defeats the gang and rescues his daughter. The sheriff tries to have Buck arrested, but the deputies, having enough of his corruption, rebel against him and willingly let Buck deal with him. In an explosive climax, Buck has the local sheriff killed (the sheriff seems to have framed Buck for a murder committed years earlier) by offering him as a target for the gang, and then has a one-on-one fistfight with Blade, which ends with the death of the villain when he accidentally ingests cocaine the gang is manufacturing. With their leader dead, the surviving motorcycle gang members ride away. Buck, J.B. and the other deputies celebrate the town's liberation.

== Cast ==
- Gary Busey as Buck Matthews
- Yaphet Kotto as J.B. Deveraux
- Seymour Cassel as Sheriff
- Bert Remsen as Father Healey
- Denise Galik as Christie Matthews
- William Smith as "Blade"
- Kimberlin Brown as Dawn
- Judith Barsi as Jennifer Matthews
- Joe Brooks as Jake
- Jorge Gil as Jamie
- Cooper Huckabee as Roger
- Ted Markland as Floyd
- Thomas Rosales Jr. as Jamie's Relative
- Timothy Scott as Deputy

== Production notes ==
=== Development ===
Although the film was marketed as being inspired by the hit song "Eye of the Tiger" (previously made famous by the film Rocky III), this was a publicity gimmick. It instead started as a spec script called Midnight Vengeance, written by Westlake Village-based screenwriter and Vietnam veteran Michael Thomas Montgomery. Said work was part of a so-called "Action Package", which included a sister film called Rolling Vengeance and a third, unproduced script by another writer.

Montgomery promoted the bundle without the help of an agent, by sending promotional posters and cold-calling some 100 production companies across the U.S. and Canada. About half responded, of which fifteen offered an in-person meeting about one film or the other. Among interested parties were the Scotti Brothers, founders of an eponymous entertainment concern encompassing music and film interests. As owners of Survivor's record label, they had rights to "Eye of the Tiger". They decided that the song would make a good vehicle for an action film, and renamed Midnight Vengeance accordingly.

=== Casting ===
For Busey, the film marked the beginning of what he called the third stage of his career, following his fast rise to fame and a period of drug and alcohol addiction that saw his weight balloon to 240 pounds. Now back to a fitter 180 pounds thanks to swimming, weightlifting and a low carb diet supervised by bodybuilder Franco Columbu, the actor professed to have improved his behavior, and decided to tackle harder edged roles, with Eye of the Tiger being his first action vehicle.

=== Filming ===
Busey announced that he would start work on the film on July 21, 1986. The film was shot in the Los Angeles area, including Valencia. It was budgeted at around $3 million.

== Release ==
=== Pre-release ===
To celebrate the film's release, Montgomery purchased a full-page ad in film trade publications Variety and The Hollywood Reporter on his own dime, which featured a reprint of a career profile previously published in his hometown newspaper. The Reporter ran it, but Variety refused, purportedly because the article contained partially unverifiable allegations by Montgomery about the settlement of an unrelated lawsuit against the makers of Smokey and the Bandit.

=== Theatrical ===
Eye of the Tiger opened on about 800 screens on November 21, 1986.

=== Home media ===
Eye of the Tiger arrived on VHS and Betamax videotapes on April 21, 1987 through U.S.A. Home Video, an imprint of International Video Entertainment. It was part of a four picture, multi-million dollar deal between Scotti Bros Pictures and IVE, who was credited as an associate producer in the film. The film made its domestic DVD debut on March 22, 2005 through Metro-Goldwyn-Mayer. A Blu-ray arrived on May 21, 2021, via Scorpion Releasing, under license from MGM.

== Reception ==
Eye of the Tiger was not screened for critics, but received reviews from select outlets, which were largely negative and focused on its tropish nature. Kevin Thomas of the Los Angeles Times praised the performances of stars Busey, Cassel, Remsen, Smith, and Kotto, but characterized Eye of the Tiger as "just another routine vengeance exploitation picture". Writing for Newhouse News Service-affiliated papers, Richard Freedman called it a "cruelly-made action picture" that is "a mishmash derived from every socko movie of the last ten years". TV Guide expressed similar disappointment, writing that "[c]onsidering the quality of the personnel involved, Eye of the Tiger should have been a solid action film boasting some good acting. Unfortunately, the script by Montgomery is an endless barrage of stale revenge-film cliches, and director Sarafian blithely ignores its faults by concentrating entirely on the action scenes and ignoring the actors".

Ballantine Books' Video Movie Guide was more amicable, finding that "Busey and Yaphet Kotto give quality performances that save this formula vengeance film". In a retrospective review, Donald Guarisco of AllMovie was positive, assessing that "it won't be confused for a classic but it gets the job done with style and economy. In short, anyone who likes action fare—particularly that of the 1980's variety—will find Eye Of The Tiger to be a tidy little surprise."

Eye of the Tiger holds a 20% rating on Rotten Tomatoes based on five reviews.

== Soundtrack ==
In addition to the titular "Eye of the Tiger" by Survivor, the film's soundtrack also features "Gravity", a song performed by James Brown and taken from his recently released Scotti Bros. album of the same name.

== See also ==
- List of American films of 1986
