= Summer Nights (Survivor song) =

1981 single by Survivor

Single by Survivor

from the album Premonition
- B-side: "Love Is on My Side"
- Released: August 1981
- Recorded: 1981
- Studio: Rumbo Recorders (Los Angeles)
- Genre: Rock
- Length: 4:08
- Label: Scotti Bros.
- Songwriters: Frankie Sullivan; Jim Peterik
- Producers: Sullivan; Peterik; Phil Bonanno; Artie Kornfeld

Survivor singles chronology
"Rebel Girl" (1980)	"Summer Nights" (1981)	"Poor Man's Son" (1981)

"Summer Nights" is a song by American rock band Survivor, released in August 1981 as the lead single from their second studio album Premonition (1981).

== Background ==
After Frankie Sullivan tentatively showed him a verse that he was writing for "Summer Nights", Jim Peterik conceived the chorus as he was driving home that day, with the idea of the song's key shifting upward during that part. When he went home, Peterik called Sullivan to tell him about the chorus, singing it over the phone. Peterik believed the song would be a hit, which deeply motivated him to write it. When A&R executive John Kalodner came to Chicago to hear Survivor's new songs for their next album, "Summer Nights" was among the songs they performed for him. Kalodner was particularly impressed by "Summer Nights", as well as "Light of a Thousand Smiles", and sent the band to the Chicago Recording Company to record demos of both songs in the following week. Sullivan and Peterik attempted to guide the rhythm section into a more simpler, rock groove, but replaced their drummer Gary Smith and bass guitarist Dennis Keith Johnson with Marc Droubay and Stephan Ellis respectively following creative differences.

"Summer Nights" was highly popular in Chicago and peaked at number 62 on the Billboard Hot 100.

== Charts ==
Chart (1982)	Peak position
US Billboard Hot 100	62
