= Somewhere in America (song) =

1980 single by Survivor

Single by Survivor

from the album Survivor
- B-side: "Freelance"
- Released: February 1980
- Recorded: 1979
- Genre: Rock
- Length: 5:13
- Label: Scotti Bros.
- Songwriter: Jim Peterik
- Producers: Ron Nevison; Barry Mraz

Survivor singles chronology
"Somewhere in America" (1980)	"Rebel Girl" (1980)

"Somewhere in America" is a song by American rock band Survivor and the lead single from their self-titled debut studio album (1979). It was their first successful song, a regional hit in the Chicago area and peaked at #70 on the Billboard Hot 100.

== Charts ==
Chart (1980)	Peak position
US Billboard Hot 100	70
