= High (David Hallyday song) =

- Standard artwork

Single by David Hallyday

from the album True Cool
- B-side: "True Cool"; "Vertigo" (12")
- Released: November 1988
- Recorded: 1987
- Length: 4:05
- Label: Scotti Brothers
- Songwriters: Lisa Catherine Cohen; David Hallyday
- Producer: Richie Wis

David Hallyday singles chronology
"He's My Girl" (1988)	"High" (1988)	"Wanna Take My Time" (1989)

Music video
- "High" (live on French TV) on YouTube

"High" is a 1988 song recorded by French artist David Hallyday. It was the second of the four singles from his debut studio album True Cool. Released in November 1988, the song was a hit in France, becoming David Hallyday's first number-one single.

== Writing and video ==
The song was composed by Lisa Catherine Cohen and the music composed by Hallyday. As for the other tracks of the album, lyrics are in English-language. The music video was shot in a church, Hallyday playing the organ, while a chorus composed of women chanted 'high' during the refrains. Elia Habib, an expert of the French charts, deemed that with this vigorous song, Hallyday presented "a musical style at the joint of Californian rock and pop".

== Chart performance ==
In France, "High" debuted on the singles chart at number 45 on 19 November 1988, climbed quickly and entered the top ten in its fourth week. It topped the chart for five consecutive weeks, dislodging Mylène Farmer's "Pourvu qu'elles soient douces"; then it almost did not stop to drop on the chart and totaled 15 weeks in the top ten and 23 weeks in the top 50. It was the most successful from the album True Cool and the second one in Hallyday's career, behind "Tu ne m'as pas laissé le temps". "High" was also released in UK with another cover single, but failed to reach the chart. On the European Hot 100 Singles, it debuted at number 90 on 10 December 1988, peaked at number five in its seventh week, and fell off the chart after 19 weeks. It charted for three weeks on the European Airplay 50, with a peak at number 40.

== Track listings ==
- 7" single
1. "High" — 4:05
2. "True Cool" — 3:29
- 12" maxi
1. "High" — 4:05
2. "True Cool" — 3:29
3. "Vertigo" — 4:08

== Charts ==
=== Weekly charts ===
Chart (1988–1989)	Peak position
Europe (European Airplay Top 50)	40
Europe (European Hot 100)	5
France (SNEP)	1

=== Year-end charts ===
Chart (1989)	Position
European Hot 100 Singles	59
