= Living in America (James Brown song) =

1985 song by James Brown

Single by James Brown

from the album Rocky IV and Gravity
- B-side: "Farewell" by Vince DiCola
- Released: December 1985
- Genre: Funk; dance
- Length: 4:42 (soundtrack version); 5:57 (Gravity album version); 4:09 (single version)
- Label: Scotti Bros.; 5682
- Songwriters: Dan Hartman; Charlie Midnight
- Producer: Dan Hartman

James Brown charting singles chronology
"Unity Part 1 (The Third Coming)" (1984)	"Living in America" (1985)	"Gravity" (1986)

Music video
- "James Brown - Living in America" on YouTube

"Living in America" is a song written by Dan Hartman and Charlie Midnight and performed by James Brown. It was released as a single in 1985 and reached number 4 on the Billboard Hot 100 chart. The song entered the Billboard top 40 on January 11, 1986, and remained on the chart for 11 weeks. It was a top five hit in the United Kingdom, peaking at number 5 on the UK Singles Chart, his only top 10 single in the UK. It was Brown's first top 40 hit in ten years on the US pop charts, and his last. In 1987, it was nominated for a Grammy Award for Best R&B Song and won Brown a Grammy Award for Best Male R&B Vocal Performance.

== Legacy ==
The song was prominently featured in the film Rocky IV. In the film, Brown sings the song during Apollo Creed’s ring entrance, in reference to the character's patriotic image. It appeared on the Rocky IV soundtrack album.

The song was also featured in the 2003 NASCAR Pontiac commercial with drivers Mike Skinner, Jack Sprague, Jerry Nadeau, Johnny Benson, Jr. and Ricky Craven.

The song's co-writer Dan Hartman later included his recording of the song on his 1994 album Keep the Fire Burnin'.

== Personnel ==
Credits adapted from the album Gravity.

- James Brown – lead vocals and backing vocals
- Stevie Ray Vaughan – lead guitar
- Dan Hartman – rhythm guitar, synthesizers and backing vocals
- T. M. Stevens – bass and backing vocals
- Ray Marchica – drums and drum machine
- The Uptown Horns (Arno Hecht, Bob Funk, Crispin Cioe, "Hollywood" Paul Litteral) – trumpets, saxophones and trombones

== Chart performance ==
=== Weekly charts ===
Chart (1985–1986)	Peak position
Australia (Kent Music Report)	18
Belgium (Ultratop 50 Flanders)	2
Canada Top Singles (RPM)	5
France (SNEP)	18
Ireland (IRMA)	8
Netherlands (Dutch Top 40)	9
Netherlands (Single Top 100)	8
New Zealand (Recorded Music NZ)	5
Sweden (Sverigetopplistan)	10
Switzerland (Schweizer Hitparade)	9
UK Singles (Official Charts)	5
US Billboard Hot 100	4
US Billboard Hot Black Singles	10
US Billboard Hot Dance Club Play	3
US Billboard Hot Dance Music/Maxi-Singles Sales	1
US Cash Box	5
West Germany (GfK)	12

=== Year-end charts ===
Chart (1986)	Position
Belgium (Ultratop 50 Flanders)	21
Canada Top Singles (RPM)	56
Netherlands (Dutch Top 40)	78
Netherlands (Single Top 100)	83
US Billboard Hot 100	65
US Cash Box	65

== Certifications ==
Region	Certification	Certified units/sales
Canada (Music Canada)	Gold	50,000^{^}
United Kingdom (BPI)	Silver	200,000^{‡}
^{^} Shipments figures based on certification alone.^{‡} Sales+streaming figures based on certification alone.

== Track listings ==
12" release

- A. "Living in America" (R & B dance version) – 6:30
- B1. "Living in America" (instrumental) – 4:33
- B2. "Living in America" (LP version) – 4:42

7" release

- A. "Living in America" – 4:08
- B. "Farewell" (Vince DiCola) – 2:58

== Parody ==
"Weird Al" Yankovic parodied the song on his 1986 album Polka Party! in a song entitled "Living with a Hernia", describing various kinds of hernias where Brown originally listed several American cities. The parody ends with Al shouting "I feel bad!" instead of Brown's trademark "I feel good!". The music video was shot on the same set Brown performed on in Rocky IV.

Paul Shanklin parodied "Living in America" on his 1999 album Bill Clinton: The Comeback Kid Tour, in a song entitled "Sneaking in America", as a reference to illegal immigration to America. The song was parodied in TV advertisements for the TV series Daisy Does America, substituting the show's title for the song's.
