= American Heartbeat =

1982 song by Survivor

Single by Survivor

from the album Eye of the Tiger
- B-side: "Silver Girl"
- Released: September 1982
- Recorded: 1981
- Genre: Hard rock
- Length: 4:10
- Label: Scotti Bros.
- Songwriters: Frankie Sullivan; Jim Peterik
- Producer: Frankie Sullivan

Survivor singles chronology
"Eye of the Tiger" (1982)	"American Heartbeat" (1982)	"The One That Really Matters" (1982)

"American Heartbeat" is a song by American rock band Survivor. It is the second most successful single from Eye of the Tiger, peaking at number 17 on the US charts. It appears as the eighth track on the album.

== Release ==
The song debuted at number 79 on September 25, 1982, and stayed on the charts for sixteen weeks. It peaked at number 17 in the week of November 20, 1982, becoming Survivor's third top 40 hit. There was also a limited heart-shaped 7" release.

== Track listing ==
1. "American Heartbeat" – 3:50
2. "Silver Girl" – 4:53

== Charts ==
Chart (1982)	Peak position
US Billboard Hot 100	17
