= The Shakin' Pyramids (album) =

Compilation album by The Shakin' Pyramids
- Released: 1983
- Genre: Rockabilly
- Label: Rock 'n Roll Records

The Shakin' Pyramids chronology
Celts and Cobras (1982)	The Shakin' Pyramids (1983)	Reeferbilly Blowout (2001)

Professional ratings
Review scores
Source	Rating
AllMusic	3/5 stars

The Shakin' Pyramids is a compilation album from the Scottish Neo-Rockabilly group The Shakin' Pyramids, released shortly after the group's disbandment in 1983 by Rock 'n Roll Records, a Scotti Brothers Records subsidiary. The album features ten tracks: five from their 1981 debut album, Skin 'Em Up, and five from their second and final album, Celts and Cobras, released in 1982. Although normally billed as a trio, live and session bassist Dave Rivett joins the band on the album cover.

== Track listing ==
Side A:

1. "Take A Trip"
2. "Tennessee Rock 'n' Roll"
3. "Teenage Boogie"
4. "Alright Alnight"
5. "Cry Cry Kitten"

Side B:

1. "Pharaoh's Chant"
2. "Quit and Split"
3. "Just Rockin'"
4. "I Got A Baby"
5. "Pretty Neat Come On"
6. "Let's Go"

== Personnel ==
- Davie Duncan – lead vocals
- James G. Creighton – guitar, background vocals
- "Railroad" Ken McLellan – guitar, background vocals
- Dave Rivett – bass guitar
