= Poor Man's Son (song) =

1981 single by Survivor

Single by Survivor

from the album Premonition
- B-side: "Love Is on My Side"
- Released: October 1981
- Recorded: 1981
- Studio: Rumbo Recorders (Los Angeles)
- Genre: Hard rock
- Length: 3:35
- Label: Scotti Bros.
- Songwriters: Frankie Sullivan; Jim Peterik
- Producers: Sullivan; Peterik; Artie Ripp; Artie Kornfeld

Survivor singles chronology
"Summer Nights" (1981)	"Poor Man's Son" (1981)	"Eye of the Tiger" (1982)

"Poor Man's Son" is a song by American rock band Survivor, released in October 1981 as the second single from their second studio album Premonition (1981). It is their first Top 40 hit, peaking at number 33 on the Billboard Hot 100.

The song drew the attention of actor Sylvester Stallone, who called Jim Peterik with a request for the band to write the theme song for the film Rocky III in a similar style, leading to Survivor recording their signature song, "Eye of the Tiger".

== Charts ==
Chart (1981–1982)	Peak position
US Billboard Hot 100	33
US Mainstream Rock (Billboard)	19
