= Tony Scotti =

American actor (born 1939)

- Born: Anthony Joseph Scotti; December 22, 1939 (age 86); Newark, New Jersey, U.S.
- Occupations: Actor, singer, television and film producer, businessman
- Years active: 1965–present
- Spouse: Sylvie Vartan (m. 1984)
- Children: 1
- Relatives: David Hallyday (stepson)

Anthony Joseph Scotti (born December 22, 1939) is an American actor, television and film producer, and co-founder of Scotti Brothers Records. He is married to French singer Sylvie Vartan. He was previously married to German actress Susan Denberg.

== Early life ==
Scotti and his brother Ben both played football for the University of Maryland. As declared on 25 February 2024 during the Italian TV show Domenica In, Tony's family originates from Gesualdo (Avellino).

== Career ==
=== Acting ===
Born in Newark, New Jersey, Scotti was performing as a night club singer in Las Vegas when he met his future first wife, Susan Denberg; in an interview in the tabloid Midnight, she said the marriage lasted less than four months, although they did not divorce until 1968. Scott began his acting by portraying Sharon Tate's love interest, Tony Polar, in the 1967 film, Valley of the Dolls; he performed the song "Come Live with Me" in the film and on the film's soundtrack. Scotti's second and final acting appearance was the title role in an unaired 1968 television pilot film, Nick Quarry, based on the 1967 film, Tony Rome.

=== Scotti Bros. ===
While pursuing film work, Tony Scotti had a mildly successful recording career with three low-chart national singles as a soloist, and two as the leader of Heaven Bound.

In 1971, Scotti abandoned his film career and joined the record production department of MGM as a senior vice president. In 1974, Scotti, along with older brother Ben, formed Ben Scotti Productions, a music marketing firm. The company eventually branched out into television and produced the pop music series, America's Top 10. The success of the show prompted the brothers to form a television syndication company, All American Television in 1981. The company would go on to distribute shows like Baywatch and Acapulco H.E.A.T.

In the mid-1980s, the company began producing movies under Scotti Brothers Pictures and would go on to release Eye of the Tiger and Lady Beware.

== Filmography ==
=== Film ===
Year	Film	Role	Notes
1967	Valley of the Dolls	Tony Polar	
1986	Eye of the Tiger	—N/a	Producer
1987	Lady Beware	—N/a	Producer
1987	He's My Girl	—N/a	Executive producer
1989	The Iron Triangle	—N/a	Producer
1992	The Resurrected	—N/a	Executive producer

=== Television ===
Year	Title	Role	Notes
1968	Nick Quarry	Nick Quarry	Unaired television series
1980–1993	America's Top 10	—N/a	Producer
1986–1987	Wordplay	—N/a	Executive producer (2 episodes)

== In popular culture ==
Scotti signed pop music parodist "Weird Al" Yankovic to the Scotti Bros. label in 1981. Scotti was portrayed by Yankovic himself in the 2022 film Weird: The Al Yankovic Story; the film is a satirical biopic loosely based on Yankovic's own life in which "Weird Al" is portrayed by Daniel Radcliffe.
