= Lady Beware =

1987 film by Karen Arthur

- Theatrical release poster
- Directed by: Karen Arthur
- Written by: Charles Zev Cohen; Susan Miller
- Produced by: Tony Scotti; Lawrence Taylor-Mortoff
- Starring: Diane Lane; Michael Woods; Cotter Smith
- Cinematography: Tom Neuwirth
- Edited by: Roy Watts
- Music by: Craig Safan
- Distributed by: Scotti Brothers Pictures
- Release date: August 14, 1987
- Running time: 108 minutes
- Country: United States
- Language: English
- Budget: $3 million
- Box office: $169,600

Lady Beware is a 1987 American thriller film directed by Karen Arthur and starring Diane Lane, Michael Woods and Cotter Smith. It was filmed on location in and around Pittsburgh.

== Plot ==
Katya Yarno, an ambitious window-dresser whose designs highlight sexy, slightly kinky themes, secures a job at Horne's department store when the store's boss, Charles Thayer, is impressed by her portfolio. As she works to construct her first display, a crowd gathers outside to watch, and Jack Price takes notice of her. He swiftly grows obsessed and stays until late into the evening to watch her work, then follows her home and spies on her through her apartment window. The next day, Thayer is pleased with the display and offers Katya a six-month contract. Meanwhile, Jack watches the store from the medical center he works at across the street. That night, Jack calls her apartment and ominously identifies himself as someone "on the same track" as her, warning her to "stay on track" as well.

Katya's next display is even more risqué, provoking controversy, but journalist Mac Odell defends her. Their burgeoning relationship enrages Jack, who escalates his stalking into stealing and reading her mail. He later covertly assaults her on a bus. After menacing Katya on the phone following the bus trip, Jack rapes his wife. He then breaks into Katya's apartment the next day while she is with Mac and her colleagues at a party. Katya and Mac return that night, and Jack watches them have sex while hiding. Katya realizes someone is in the apartment, escapes with Mac, and contacts the police.

Jack accosts Katya at the store, but she does not see his face. He breaks into her apartment again by rappelling from the roof and vandalizes it, leaving a message written in blood on her mirror. In her horror, she creates an even more provocative display that partially emerges from the store, unwittingly giving Jack the opportunity to set fire to it. Thayer puts the traumatized Katya on a leave of absence so she can recover.

Katya finally snaps and decides to take matters into her own hands. The next time Jack calls, she arranges an in-person meeting, where she warns that she will get her revenge if he doesn't leave her alone. Katya discovers his full name and address, publicly posts photos of his face with the message "pervert" around his neighborhood, and exposes his actions to his wife. When he realizes his wife has left with their children, he resolves to kill Katya.

Katya lures Jack to the department store for their final confrontation. She leads him on a chase through the darkened store, ending with her locking him in a new window display she created for him using his X-ray slides. A short time later, the police arrive and take Jack into custody.

== Cast ==
- Diane Lane as Katya Yarno
- Michael Woods as Jack Price
- Cotter Smith as Mac Odell
- Peter Nevargic as Lionel
- Edward Penn as Mr. Thayer
- Tyra Ferrell as Nan
- Trisha Simmons as Sylvia Price
- Clayton D. Hill as Police Officer #1
- David Crawford as Katya's father
- Ray Laine as Doctor
- Bingo O'Malley as Man in Window
- Don Brockett as Locksmith

== Production ==
=== Development ===
Arthur began working on Lady Beware in the late '70s, shortly after the success of her second feature, The Mafu Cage, which screened at Cannes, landed her a four-picture deal at Universal. Universal, however, ended up rejecting the project, which ended up having "100 homes, 17 drafts, and eight writers," as Arthur told The Los Angeles Times in 1986 ahead of the film's release. "The purse-holders are men, and they attempted to make Lady Beware into a violent picture," Arthur added. "I'm not interested in making a picture where a woman gets beat up. I want to show how a lady deals with this kind of insidious violence. A policeman can't help."

=== Filming ===
The film was shot on location in Pittsburgh during the summer of 1986 after Scotti Brothers Entertainment agreed to finance and distribute it. The budget was reportedly under $2 million. Lady Beware's 28 days of shooting took place primarily in the city's North Side and downtown neighborhoods.

== Release ==
=== Home media ===
Lady Beware was released on VHS and Laserdisc in 1988 by International Video Entertainment. A second VHS release was put out in 1991 by Avid Home Entertainment.

=== Soundtrack ===
Lady Beware was released on two soundtrack albums.

The 27 track complete and original music score by Craig Safan on Dragon's Domain Records 2020.

The 9 track original motion picture soundtrack including 5 tracks from the original music score by Craig Safan, 3 tracks by David Hallyday and a track by Abe E LaMarca available on all music formats on Scotti Bros Records 1987.

=== Controversy ===
Arthur did not approve of the film's final cut, which she said was re-edited by the producers to appeal to the exploitation crowd. "[Some distributors asked for] more sex, so they took outtakes of Diane Lane standing there naked and incorporated them into the film," she told the Los Angeles Times ahead of the film's release. "To me, that's exploitative. They printed up negatives where I never said print. I, as a female director, would never exploit a woman's body and use it as a turn-on." Arthur added that she did not remove her name from the film because she thought it would be unfair to the actors, who can't remove their names from the final product.
