= All American Television =

American television production and distribution company (1981–1998)

- Logo used from 1991 to 1998
- Type: Subsidiary
- Industry: Television
- Predecessors: Lexington Broadcast Services Company; Blair Entertainment
- Founded: 1981; 45 years ago
- Founders: Anthony and Ben Scotti; Syd Vinnedge
- Defunct: 1998; 28 years ago
- Fate: Renamed as Pearson Television North America
- Successor: Fremantle North America
- Headquarters: Santa Monica, California, United States
- Services: Television production; Television syndication
- Parent: All American Communications (1991–1997); Pearson Television (1997–1998)
- Subsidiaries: Mark Goodson Productions; Fremantle International; Fremantle UK Productions Ltd

All American Television (later known as All American Communications Television and formerly Scotti Brothers-Syd Vinnedge Television and Scotti Vinnedge Television) was a television syndication company active from 1981 to 1998. It was founded by Anthony J. Scotti, Ben Scotti, and Syd Vinnedge. The company was known for producing and distributing television shows such as Baywatch, America's Top 10, and the Mark Goodson Productions library of game shows.

== History ==
All American's roots trace back to 1967 where Anthony J. Scotti was a fledgling actor who was famous for playing "Tony Polar" in the movie Valley of the Dolls. After that, Scotti found his life as an actor boring. He told Forbes magazine, "I had come to the conclusion that acting was the most boring God-awful thing a human being could do." He then quit his acting career in 1971 to pursue a career in music. At the time, he was named senior vice president of MGM's record division. Three years later, he teamed up with his brother Ben to create Scotti Brothers Records, a music marketing company that produced the success of artists such as Electric Light Orchestra, Survivor, and "Weird Al" Yankovic.

In 1979, the Scotti Brothers entered the television business by producing the pop music show America's Top 10, hosted by popular radio DJ Casey Kasem. Two years later, the show's popularity led the Scotti Brothers and Syd Vinnedge, a veteran of TV and radio advertising, to found New York-based All American Television. The new company was named after Anthony Scotti's success as a football player in high school. Former employees of Gold Key Media would be migrated into the company.

In 1982, All American hired George Back, the founder of a small television syndicator in New York who brought Joe Kovacs with him into the company. In 1983, it entered into a joint venture with fellow New York-based syndicators MG Films and Perin Enterprises (later to merge as MG Perin) to distribute The Dance Show, produced by WSB-TV in Atlanta, and picked up another program hosted by Casey Kasem named America's Choice. Also that year, Alexy Klucar had to join the company, who served as administrative director of the studio, and Don Golden, who was formerly executive of Golden West Television, joined All American Television as sales executive. In 1985, All American went public and began trading as a pink sheet on the over-the-counter (OTC) market. Later, the company joined the New York Stock Exchange. In 1987, it attempted to merge with television producer/distributor Atlantic Kushner-Locke to form a single company that paid $36 million in an effort to become a public organization without an effort of a single public offering, but the merger talks between All American Television and Atlantic Kushner-Locke were never realized.

In 1988, it served as the advertising sales barter of Vestron Television's own Double Images movie packages, which was available to be for the syndication market. In 1989, it entered into a new joint venture with MG Perin to handle syndication of Inside Video: This Week for the first-run syndication market.

=== 1990s ===
In late 1990, All American paved the way for success when it acquired the first-run syndication rights to Baywatch (a fledgling beach drama series that NBC canceled at the time) through LBS Communications. The move paid off and Baywatch went on to become one of the most popular TV shows until its cancellation in 2001.

In 1991, All American and Scotti Brothers Entertainment Industries merged in a stock swap that created the television and music recording core of what would eventually become All American Communications. Anthony Scotti became CEO of the combined entity, and in January 1991 he hired Myron Roth, a former MCA Records and CBS Records executive, to become the company's new president and COO. Syd Vinnedge was named senior executive vice president and Ben Scotti became executive vice president of the records division. All American was represented by Howard L. Mann of Schwartzman, Weinstock, Garelick & Mann, P.C. The Scotti Brothers Records label distributed its music through BMG Music from 1990 to 1996.

The company then acquired the assets of its Baywatch distribution partner, Lexington Broadcast Services Company (LBS), which at the time had declared Chapter 11 bankruptcy. By October 1991, All American announced its long-awaited merger with LBS, and Anthony Scotti decided to name LBS founder Henry Siegel as All American's new president. Henry Siegel's brother Paul Siegel was named the company's new president of international and ancillary markets. The distribution rights of Baywatch and Family Feud reverted to All American in the agreement, while cancelling off LBS' collaboration with NBC, Memories...Then and Now.

By late 1992, All American's first attempt to clone the success of Baywatch—an action series Acapulco H.E.A.T.—had been sold to half of the United States independent television market.

In December 1993, All American's Scotti Brothers Records subsidiary created a new urban rap division called Street Life Records which showcased African-American urban acts such as Skee-Lo, The Comrads, and Craig Mack. Also that year, it signed a deal with DIC Entertainment to launch Superhuman Samurai Syber-Squad, which was modeled on the success of Mighty Morphin' Power Rangers, for the 1994-95 syndicated TV season, using footage from Gridman the Hyper Agent, from Tsuburaya Productions and its Ultracom subsidiary.

In 1994, All American found itself once again fighting its image as a "one-show wonder" when it was forced to cancel Acapulco H.E.A.T. after half a season and police drama Sirens after one season on the air. In July 1994, despite rumors that Henry and Paul Siegel were fired due to their dissatisfaction with the cancellation of Acapulco H.E.A.T., All American acquired interest in worldwide game show production company Fremantle International (not to be confused with the current incarnation of Fremantle where the rights to the original Fremantle and All American library stand today) from Interpublic Group of Companies. In exchange for a 20% stake in All American, Interpublic gave All American some of the programming rights to Fremantle International's 93 game shows, which included local language versions of popular American game shows, such as The Price is Right and Family Feud (All American syndicated Feud in the U.S. at the time), all highly popular in their foreign markets. A month later, former Fremantle chairman Larry Lamattina replaced Henry Siegel as the new president and CEO of All American Television. Henry and Paul Siegel officially left the company to form SeaGull Entertainment, which handled syndication of children's programs, and signed a deal with DIC Entertainment.

In October 1995, All American acquired 50% of the assets and library of Mark Goodson Productions, the producers of classic game shows including The Price is Right and Family Feud, which the company acquired the foreign distribution rights through Fremantle International. By 1995, David Gerber had signed an agreement to join the studio, which was entitled All American Television Productions. In March 1996, Scotti Bros. Records, which had released some 142 albums since 1982, was officially renamed All American Music Group and announced a distribution deal with Warner Music Group that promised to increase its penetration of the pop music market. A month later, All American acquired the remaining 50% of Mark Goodson Productions from Interpublic, giving All American total ownership of the Goodson library of game shows. Two months later, All American purchased international talk show producer and distributor Orbis Entertainment Company (not to be confused with now-defunct TV syndicator Orbis Communications, although both companies were created by the same two founders Robert Turner and Ethan Podell), which was renamed All American/Orbis Communications. The acquisition significantly bolstered All American's shift into international television production and distribution and led to All American's second domestic attempt into the talk genre in the fall of 1997 with Arthel and Fred. Its first attempt, The Richard Bey Show, which originated as a local talk show at WWOR-TV in Secaucus, NJ, was cancelled in November 1996. All-American had also distributed a show featuring popular radio shock jock Howard Stern from 1990 to 1992 that originated at WWOR, called simply The Howard Stern Show. In July 1996, All American formed an in-house licensing and merchandising division to increase control of Baywatch and other merchandise lines.

By 1997, the record label was sold to Zomba Music Group's Volcano Records. Meanwhile, All American was sold to Pearson plc's Pearson Television subsidiary, and All American became Pearson Television's U.S. division. When Pearson Television merged with CLT-UFA to form the RTL Group in 2000, Pearson TV became the content production arm of the new group, then changed its name to FremantleMedia the next year, and eventually in 2018 renamed into Fremantle, thus reviving the name of that acquired companies.

Talbot Television was an international division of Pearson Television which identified itself as "All-American Fremantle".

=== Current status of the All American libraries ===
Today, the current incarnation of Fremantle (formerly FremantleMedia) holds the rights to the All American and LBS libraries, as well as the old Fremantle International library of game shows, and the Orbis Entertainment library of talk shows. Vinnedge remained with the company for several years after, including replacing Bob Barker as executive producer of The Price Is Right for the first several years after Barker's retirement in 2007; he has since retired.

== See also ==
- Fremantle
- Lexington Broadcast Services Company
