= The One That Really Matters =

1983 single by Survivor

Single by Survivor

from the album Eye of the Tiger
- Released: January 1983
- Studio: Rumbo Recorders (Los Angeles)
- Genre: Hard rock
- Length: 3:28
- Label: Scotti Bros.
- Songwriter: Jim Peterik
- Producers: Peterik; Frankie Sullivan

Survivor singles chronology
"American Heartbeat" (1983)	"The One That Really Matters" (1983)	"Caught in the Game" (1983)

"The One That Really Matters" is a song by American rock band Survivor, released in January 1983 as the third single from their third studio album Eye of the Tiger (1982).

Jim Peterik originally wanted the album to be named after the song, but the band eventually named it after their song "Eye of the Tiger".

== Charts ==
Chart (1983)	Peak position
US Billboard Hot 100	74
