= How Do You Stop =

Single by James Brown

from the album Gravity
- B-side: "House of Rock"
- Released: January 1987
- Recorded: 1986
- Genre: R&B, funk
- Length: 3:59; 4:53 (album version)
- Label: Scotti Bros.
- Songwriters: Dan Hartman; Charlie Midnight
- Producer: Dan Hartman

James Brown charting singles chronology
"Gravity" (1986)	"How Do You Stop" (1987)	"She's The One" (1988)

Audio video
- "How Do You Stop" on YouTube

"How Do You Stop" is a song written by Dan Hartman and Charlie Midnight and recorded by James Brown. It appeared on Brown's 1986 album Gravity and was released as a single which charted at number 10 on the US R&B chart. Brown also performs the song on his 1989 album Soul Session Live.

Joni Mitchell covered "How Do You Stop" on her 1994 album Turbulent Indigo in a version featuring vocals by Seal.

== Personnel ==
- James Brown – vocals
- Steve Winwood – synthesizers (listed in liner notes as "Lead & Backing Synthesizer")
- Dan Hartman – guitars, keyboards, programming and background vocals
- T. M. Stevens – bass, background vocals
- Ray Marchica – drums
- The Uptown Horns (Arno Hecht, Bob Funk, Crispin Cioe, "Hollywood" Paul Litteral) – all brass instruments
