= Gravity (James Brown song) =

Single by James Brown

from the album Gravity
- B-side: "Gravity (Dub Mix)"
- Released: 1986
- Genre: R&B
- Length: 3:52
- Label: Scotti Bros. 06275
- Songwriter(s): Dan Hartman; Charlie Midnight
- Producer(s): Dan Hartman

James Brown charting singles chronology
"Living in America" (1985)	"Gravity" (1986)	"How Do You Stop" (1986)

Audio video
- "Gravity" on YouTube

"Gravity" is a song written by Dan Hartman and Charlie Midnight and recorded by James Brown. It appears on Brown's 1986 album of the same name. It was also released as a single and charted #26 R&B and #93 Pop.

== Personnel ==
- James Brown: Vocals
- Dan Hartman: Guitars, Keyboards, Programming
- T. M. Stevens: Bass, Background vocals
- Ray Marchica: Drums
- The Uptown Horns (Arno Hecht, Bob Funk, Crispin Cioe, "Hollywood" Paul Litteral): All Brass Instruments
- Chris Lord-Alge - mixing
