= Karen Arthur =

American film director, producer, and actress

- Born: August 24, 1941 (age 84); Omaha, Nebraska, U.S.
- Occupations: Director, producer, actress
- Years active: 1966–2008

Karen Arthur (born August 24, 1941) is an American television and film director, producer, and actress. She directed more than 40 feature and made-for-television movies, miniseries, and television series. In 1985, she became the first woman to win a Primetime Emmy Award for Outstanding Directing in a Drama Series.

Arthur began her career as an actress, appearing in the 1967 romantic comedy film A Guide for the Married Man, and later co-starred in the drama film Winning (1969). She made several guest-starring appearances on television series before making her directorial debut with the 1975 crime drama film, Legacy, which received a special prize at the Locarno Film Festival. She later directed feature films The Mafu Cage (1978) and Lady Beware (1987).

== Early life and education ==
Karen Arthur was born on August 24, 1941 in Omaha, Nebraska.

== Career ==
Arthur made her television debut appearing in an episode of NBC sitcom The Monkees in 1966 and the following year featured in the romantic comedy film A Guide for the Married Man. In 1969, Arthur played a supporting role in the drama film Winning opposite Paul Newman. She also made more than 15 guest-starring appearances on television series such as The Wild Wild West, The Big Valley, That Girl, Get Smart, The Doris Day Show, Mannix, Ironside and The Streets of San Francisco.

In 1975, Arthur made her directorial debut with the crime drama film Legacy starring Joan Hotchkis. She later directed three more feature films, including Lady Beware (1987) and The Mafu Cage (1978), but the majority of her work has been in television, where she has had a long and prolific career directing television movies and series. In 1976 she directed one of episodes of Rich Man, Poor Man Book II and in 1979 directed her first made-for-television movie Charleston. In 1983 she directed Australian miniseries Return to Eden, the mini-series was a huge ratings success.

She worked as an episodic director on Hart to Hart, Remington Steele, Emerald Point N.A.S. and most notable Cagney & Lacey (8 episodes). In 1985, she won a Primetime Emmy Award for Outstanding Directing in a Drama Series (for an episode of Cagney & Lacey), becoming the first woman to do so.

Arthur directed many various made-for-television movies and miniseries, such as Victims for Victims: The Theresa Saldana Story (1984), A Bunny's Tale (1985), The Rape of Richard Beck (1985), Bridge to Silence (1989), Fall from Grace (1990), Love and Betrayal: The Mia Farrow Story (1995), Dead By Sunset (1995), True Women (1997) and A Will of Their Own (1998).

As of 2008 she was a resident of the town of Springfield, Vermont.

== Partial filmography ==
List of film and television works
Title	Year	Notes
The Christmas Blessing	2005	TV movie
Judging Amy		TV series
The Locket	2002	TV movie
The Song of the Lark	2001	TV movie, based on The Song of the Lark by Willa Cather
The Lost Child	2000	TV movie
The Staircase	1998	TV movie
Love and Betrayal: The Mia Farrow Story	1995	TV movie
The Jacksons: An American Dream	1992	TV miniseries
The Secret	1992	TV movie
Shadow of a Doubt	1991	TV movie
Blue Bayou	1990	TV movie
Lady Beware	1987	Film
Crossings	1986	TV miniseries
Victims for Victims: The Theresa Saldana Story	1984	TV movie
Cagney & Lacey		TV series
Remington Steele		TV series
Hart to Hart	1979	TV series
The Mafu Cage	1978	Film
Legacy	1975	Film
Like It Is (re-released as Not My Daughter)	1970 / 1971	Film, final big screen appearance, co-starring in 1970 exploitation film whose 1971 straight-to-drive-in re-release was advertised as "A TRUE STORY DESCRIBED IN THE LURID LANGUAGE KNOWN ONLY BY TODAY'S YOUTH"
Mannix	1970	TV series, Season 4 Ep. 11 "Bang Bang, You Are Dead"
Get Smart	1969	TV series, Season 5 Ep.7 "And Baby Makes Four Part.1"
The Wild Wild West	1967	TV series, Season 3 Ep.15 "The Night of the Running Death"
