= David Hallyday =

French musician, actor, and car racer (born 1966)

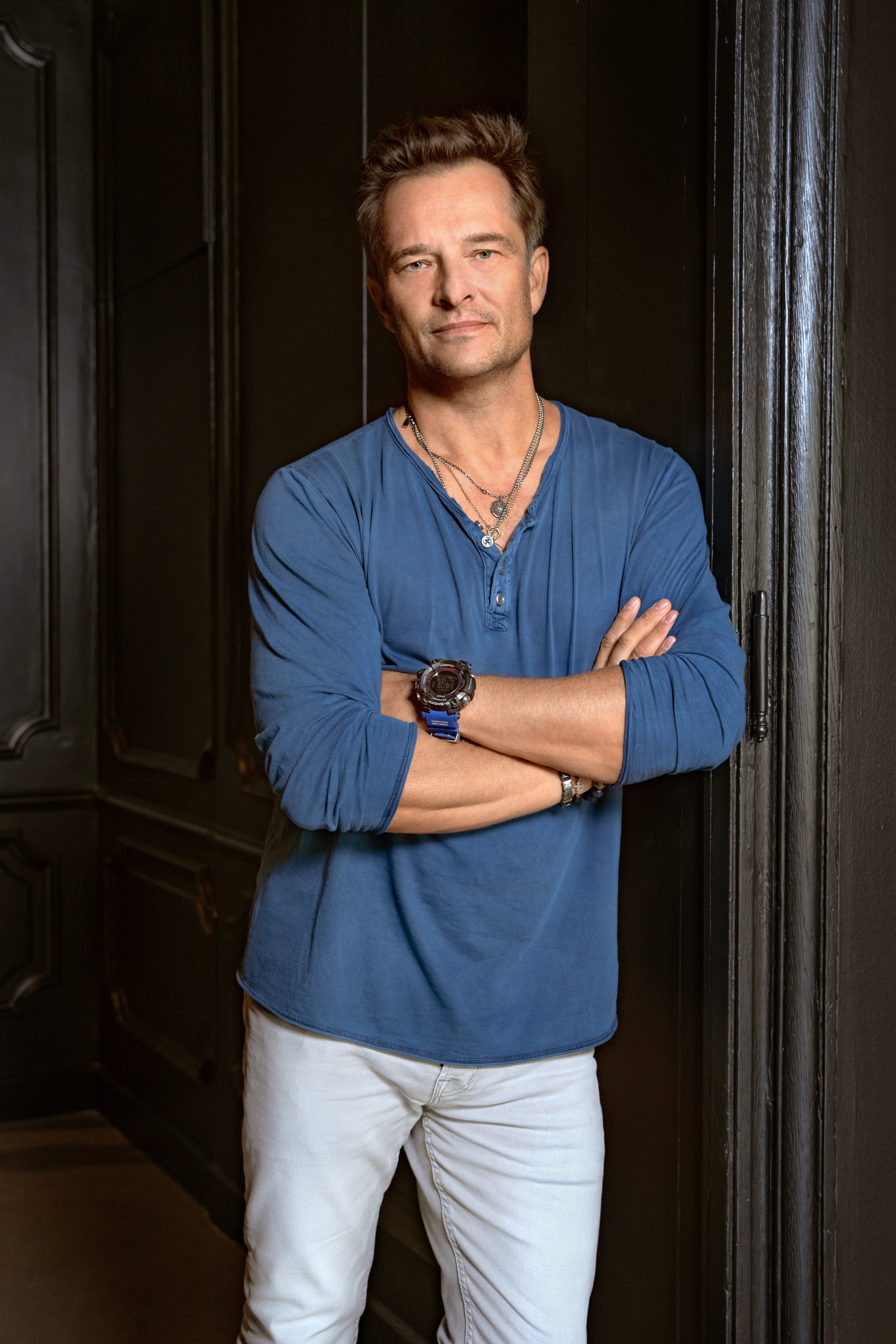
- Hallyday in 2020
- Born: David Michaël Benjamin Smet; 14 August 1966 (age 60); Boulogne-Billancourt, France
- Occupations: Singer; songwriter; racing driver
- Years active: 1985–present
- Spouses: Estelle Lefébure (m. 1989; div. 2001) Alexandra Pastor (m. 2004)
- Children: 3
- Parents: Johnny Hallyday (father); Sylvie Vartan (mother)
- Relatives: Laura Smet (half-sister); Tony Scotti (stepfather); Eddie Vartan (uncle); Michael Vartan (cousin)
- Musical career
- Instruments: Vocals; drums; guitar; keyboards
- Labels: PolyGram; Scotti Bros.
- Formerly of: Blind Fish; Novacaine; Mission Control

24 Hours of Le Mans career
- Years: 2003 – 2014
- Categorisation: FIA Silver (until 2013); FIA Bronze (2012–) (Note: During the 2012–2013 period, Hallyday simultaneously held an FIA WEC categorisation of silver and an FIA GT3 categorisation of bronze. He was downgraded to bronze by FIA WEC in 2014. When both lists merged in 2015, he remained bronze.)
- Teams: Courage, PSI, Larbre, Oreca, IMSA Performance
- Best finish: 28th (2007 & 2008)
- Class wins: 0

David Michaël Benjamin Smet (born 14 August 1966), known as David Hallyday, is a French singer, songwriter, actor and amateur sports car racer.

== Early life ==
Hallyday was born in Boulogne-Billancourt and is the son of the French singers Johnny Hallyday and Sylvie Vartan. David Hallyday is a first cousin of actor Michael Vartan. He is the older half-brother of actress Laura Smet.

== Career ==
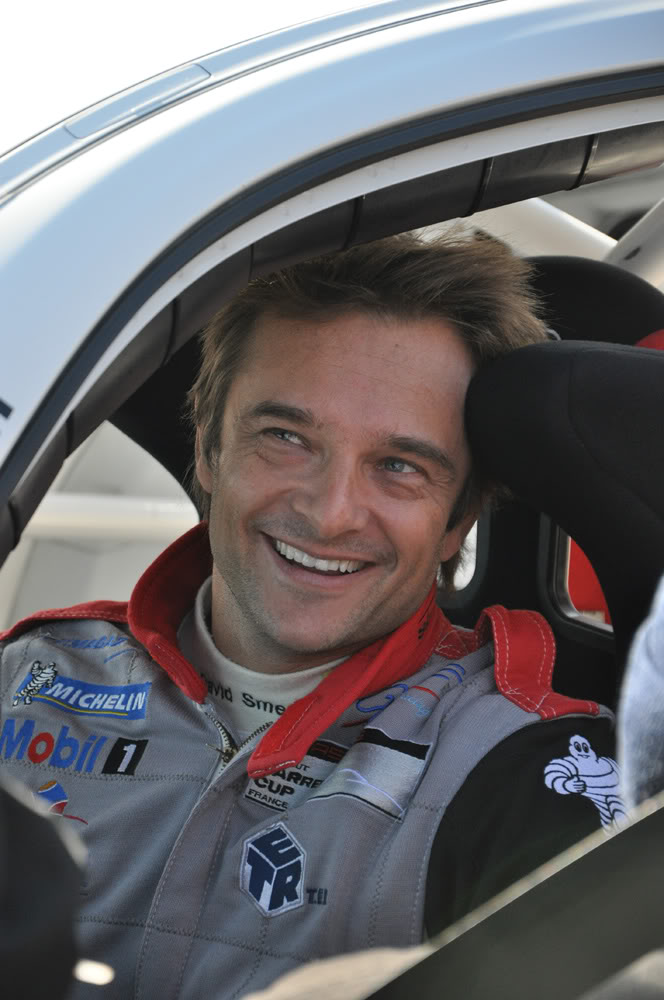
Hallyday in 2009

Hallyday is most known for writing music for others, including a collaboration with his father on the 1999 album Sang pour sang.

Hallyday appeared in the teenage comedy He's My Girl (1987), also performing its title theme song. "He's My Girl" reached #79 on the U.S. Billboard Hot 100 and #72 on Cash Box. His 1991 album Rock 'n' Heart spawned a bigger hit, "Ooh La La", which reached #51 on the Hot 100.

In the late 1980s, Hallyday had some success with his first solo records, but was unhappy. He decided to quit music, planning to do something different. He had an idea to reform his high-school garage band, Blind Fish but instead he formed Novacaine with his friend Erik Godal, a surf-grunge band. They toured and started to get some Top 40 radio play. But at the same time, Hallyday began writing for the European market because his label, Mercury Records asked him to write some songs in French. He made some demos and resumed his solo career in France while Novacaine went on hiatus with Hallyday saying that a new album was in the works for 2000. Meanwhile, Erik Godal joined up with the LA surf-noir band The Blue Hawaiians that scored music for TV show SpongeBob SquarePants. Besides The Blue Hawaiians, Godal continued to score for film and TV and was nominated for the 2006 Annie award for his work on Squirrelboy. Other films he scored include the Sundance film Subject Two and What Love Is. Godal also continued to work with Hallyday contributing to his solo album Revelation, appearing on touring dates and producing some songs for Johnny Hallyday, Tina Arena and Cylia.

== Personal life ==
Hallyday married Estelle Lefébure on 15 September 1989; they divorced in 2001. They have two children. In 2004, he had a son with Alexandra Pastor.

== Discography ==
=== Albums ===
==== Studio albums ====
Title	Album details	Peak chart positions			Certifications
Title	Album details	FRA	BE (WA)	SWI	Certifications
True Cool	Released: April 1988; Label: Scotti Bros.; Formats: CD, LP, MC; Re-released in Japan in 1989 as Your Power of Love	13	—	—	FRA: 2× Platinum
Rock 'n' Heart	Released: October 1990; Label: Scotti Bros.; Formats: CD, LP, MC	14	—	—	FRA: 2× Gold
2000 BBF (with Blind Fish)	Released: 14 March 1994; Label: Scotti Bros.; Formats: CD, MC	—	—	—	
Novacaine (with Novacaine)	Released: May 1997; Label: Mercury; Formats: CD, MC	—	—	—	
Un paradis/un enfer	Released: 14 June 1999; Label: Mercury; Formats: CD, MC	9	7	—	FRA: 2× Gold
Révélation	Released: 24 June 2002; Label: Mercury; Formats: CD	9	—	44	
Satellite	Released: 14 September 2004; Label: Mercury; Formats: CD	14	44	41	
David Hallyday	Released: 18 June 2007; Label: Mercury; Formats: CD	25	32	—	
Un nouveau monde	Released: 15 March 2010; Label: Mercury; Formats: CD	9	18	63	
Alive (with Mission Control)	Released: 30 March 2015; Label: Self-released; Formats: CD	—	—	—	
Le temps d'une vie	Released: 25 November 2016; Label: Polydor; Formats: CD, digital download	71	132	—	
J'ai quelque chose à vous dire	Released: 7 December 2018; Label: Play Two; Formats: CD, LP, digital download	5	7	14	FRA: Platinum
Imagine un monde	Released: 27 November 2020; Label: Play Two; Formats: CD, LP, digital download	33	55	—	
Requiem pour un fou	Released: 21 June 2024; Label: TF1 Musique; Formats: CD, 2xCD, 2xLP, digital download	3	3	17	
"—" denotes releases that did not chart or were not released in that territory.

==== Live albums ====
Title	Album details	Peak chart positions
Title	Album details	FRA
On the Road	Released: May 1992; Label: Scotti Bros.; Formats: CD, 2xCD, MC	28

==== Compilation albums ====
Title	Album details
Master serie	Released: 1998; Label: Podis; Formats: CD, MC

=== Singles ===
Title	Year	Peak chart positions				Certifications	Album
Title	Year	FRA	BE (WA)	SWI	US	Certifications	Album
"Tonight Your Mine" (Note: "Tonight Your Mine" was only released as a single in Japan.)	1985	—	—	—	—		Non-album single
"He's My Girl"	1987	8	—	—	79	FRA: Silver	He's My Girl (soundtrack)
"Lady Beware" (Note: "Lady Beware" was only released as a single in Japan.)	1987	—	—	—	—		Lady Beware (soundtrack)
"Rock Revival" (Note: "Rock Revival" was only released as a single in Germany and Italy.)	1988	—	—	—	—		He's My Girl (soundtrack)
"Move"	1988	—	—	—	—		True Cool
"High"	1988	1	—	—	—		True Cool
"Your Power of Love" (Note: "Your Power of Love" was only released as a single in Japan.)	1989	—	—	—	—		Your Power of Love
"Wanna Take My Time"	1989	11	—	—	—		True Cool
"Listening"	1989	11	—	—	—		True Cool
"Tears of the Earth"	1990	6	—	—	—	FRA: Silver	Rock 'n' Heart
"About You"	1990	10	—	—	—		Rock 'n' Heart
"Ooh La La"	1991	28	—	—	51		Rock 'n' Heart
"Change of Heart"	1991	21	—	—	—		Rock 'n' Heart
"Hold On Blue Eyes"	1992	34	—	—	—		On the Road
"Héros" (with Blind Fish)	1993	—	—	—	—		Non-album single
"Pain and Pride" (with Blind Fish)	1993	—	—	—	—		2000 BBF
"Natural Child" (with Blind Fish)	1994	—	—	—	—		2000 BBF
"Tu ne m'as pas laissé le temps"	1999	1	2	—	—	FRA: Diamond	Un paradis/un enfer
"Pour toi"	1999	33	32	—	—		Un paradis/un enfer
"Ange étrange"	2000	36	—	—	—		Un paradis/un enfer
"Le manque à donner"	2000	—	—	—	—		Un paradis/un enfer
"Repenses-y si tu veux"	2002	36	—	—	—		Révélation
"Un homme libre"	2002	35	—	68	—		Treasure Planet (French version, soundtrack)
"Le défi"	2004	14	34	—	—		Satellite
"Satellite"	2005	45	—	—	—		Satellite
"Steve McQueen"	2007	—	—	—	—		David Hallyday
"On se fait peur" (with Laura Smet)	2010	—	18	—	—		Un nouveau monde
"Le cœur qui boite"	2010	—	—	—	—		Un nouveau monde
"Comme avant"	2016	—	—	—	—		Le temps d'une vie
"Des portes entre nous"	2017	—	—	—	—		Le temps d'une vie
"Ma dernière lettre"	2018	—	—	—	—		J'ai quelque chose à vous dire
"Éternel"	2018	—	—	—	—		J'ai quelque chose à vous dire
"J'ai quelque chose à vous dire"	2019	—	—	—	—		J'ai quelque chose à vous dire
"Ensemble et maintenant"	2020	—	—	—	—		Imagine un monde
"Le plus heureux des hommes"	2023	—	—	—	—		Non-album single
"Requiem pour un fou"	2023	—	—	—	—		Requiem pour un fou
"Sang pour sang"	2024	—	—	—	—		Requiem pour un fou
"—" denotes releases that did not chart or were not released in that territory.

== 24 Hours of Le Mans results ==
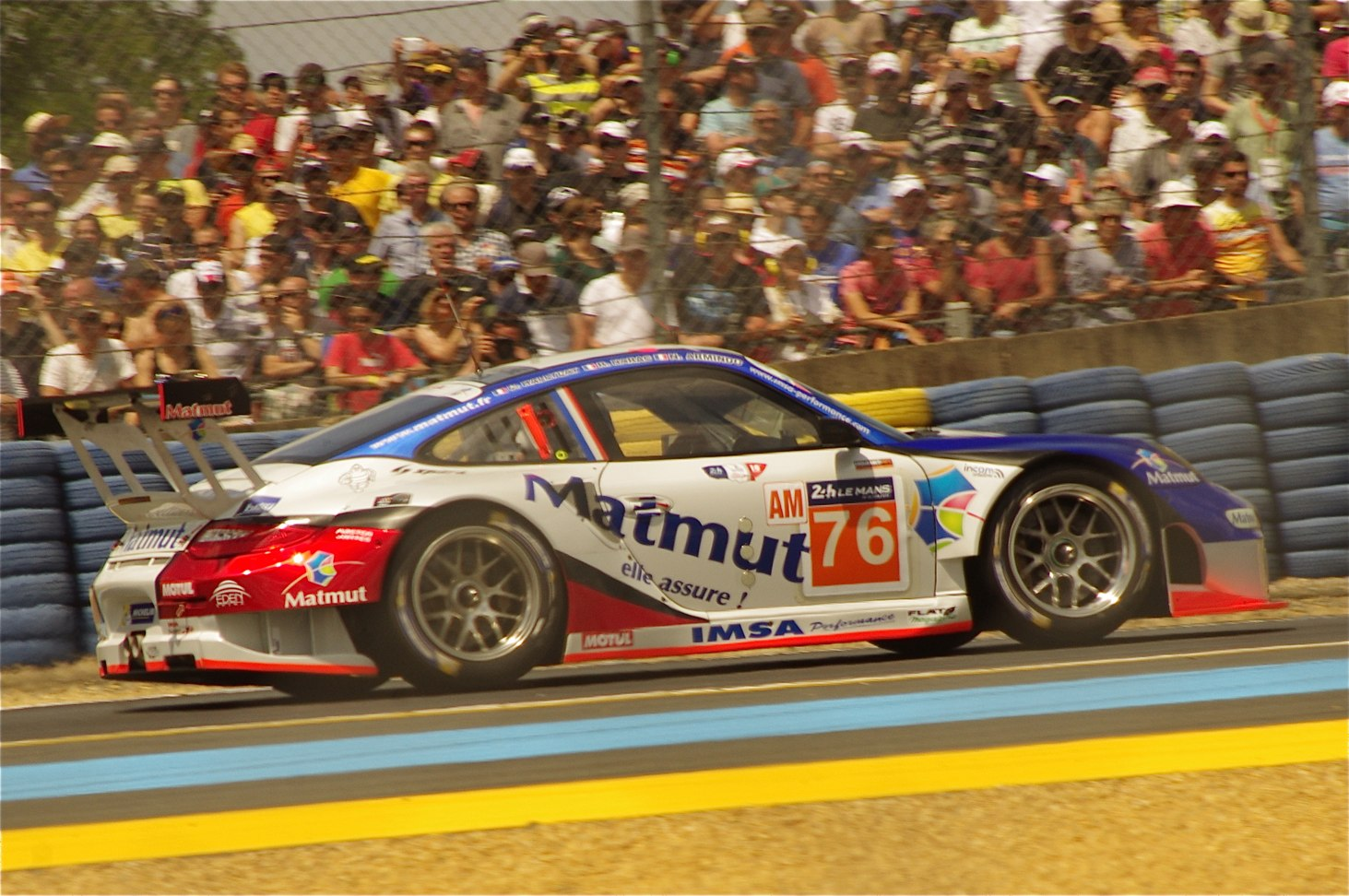
Hallyday in his final 24 Hours of Le Mans appearance in 2014.

Year	Team	Co-drivers	Car	Class	Laps	Pos.	Class pos.
2003	(France) Courage Compétition	(France) Philippe Alliot (Sweden) Carl Rosenblad	Courage C65-JPX	LMP675	41	DNF	DNF
2007	(Belgium) PSI Experience	(France) Claude-Yves Gosselin (Austria) Philipp Peter	Chevrolet Corvette C6.R	GT1	289	28th	12th
2008	(France) Larbre Compétition	(France) Christophe Bouchut (France) Patrick Bornhauser	Saleen S7-R	GT1	306	28th	7th
2011	(France) Team Oreca-Matmut	(France) Alexandre Prémat (Austria) Dominik Kraihamer	Oreca 03-Nissan	LMP2	200	DNF	DNF
2014	(France) IMSA Performance Matmut	(France) Raymond Narac (France) Nicolas Armindo	Porsche 997 GT3-RSR	GTE; Am	323	31st	11th
