= Cartouche (group) =

Belgian Eurodance group

- Origin: Belgium
- Genres: Eurodance, Hip house
- Years active: 1990–1997
- Labels: Scotti Brothers
- Past members: Myrelle Tholen; Jean-Paul Visser

Cartouche was a Belgian Eurodance group whose biggest dance hit from 1991 was "Feel the Groove", which peaked at number 13 in 1991 on the French Singles Chart. The members consisted of Myrelle Tholen and Jean-Paul Visser. The group only released one album, House Music All Night Long in 1991. The group also sang "Miracles", "Shame" and "Touch the Sky" (in 1994) which were all composed and produced by Serge Ramaekers.

== Discography ==
=== Studio albums ===
Year	Album details
House Music All Night Long	Release date: 23 July 1991; Label: Scotti Bros. Records

=== Singles ===
Year	Single	Peak chart positions					Album
Year	Single	CAN Dance	FRA	UK	U.S.	U.S. Dance	Album
1991	"Feel the Groove"	6	13	97	66	8	House Music All Night Long
1991	"Let the Music Take Control"	—	—	—	—	—	House Music All Night Long
1991	"Hold On"	—	—	—	—	—	House Music All Night Long
1991	"Do Your Thing"	—	—	—	—	—	House Music All Night Long
1993	"Shame"	—	—	—	—	—	Singles only
1994	"Touch the Sky"	1	—	—	—	—	Singles only
1995	"Miracles"	3	—	—	—	—	Singles only
1996	"Feel the Rain"	—	—	—	—	—	Singles only
1997	"Runnin' Up That Hill"	—	—	—	—	—	Singles only
"—" denotes releases that did not chart
