= Feel the Groove =

Single by Cartouche

from the album House Music All Night Long
- B-side: "Remix"
- Released: January 1991
- Recorded: 1990
- Genre: House
- Length: 3:40
- Songwriter: Serge Ramaekers
- Producer: Serge Ramaekers

Cartouche singles chronology
"Feel the Groove" (1991)	"Let the Music Take Control" (1991)

"Feel the Groove" is a song by the Belgian Eurodance group Cartouche. It was released in January 1991 as the lead single from their album, House Music All Night Long. A CD maxi with new remixes was also available, but it was marketed at the same time as the other media. The song was their biggest hit, peaking at number 13 in France and charting in the United Kingdom and the United States.

British band Oasis partially covered the song with their unreleased demo track "Better Let You Know", which they recorded circa 1992.

== Track listings ==
- CD maxi (USA, 1991)
1. "Feel the Groove" (Sergosonic 7" edit) - 3:40
2. "Feel the Groove" (Sergosonic mix) - 4:58
3. "Feel the Groove" (underground remix) - 6:21
4. "Feel the Groove" (remix) - 5:20
- CD single
1. "Feel the Groove" - 5:20
2. "Feel the Groove" (instrumental) - 4:35

== Charts ==
=== Weekly charts ===
Chart (1991)	Peak position
Belgium (Ultratop 50 Flanders)	41
Belgium (VRT Top 30 Flanders)	29
Canada Dance/Urban (RPM)	6
Europe (Eurochart Hot 100)	71
France (SNEP)	13
UK Singles (OCC)	97
US Billboard Hot 100	66
US Hot Dance Club Play (Billboard)	8
US Cash Box Top 100	66

=== Year-end charts ===
Chart (1990)	Position
UK Club Chart (Record Mirror)	70
