= The Shakin' Pyramids =

Scottish rockabilly band

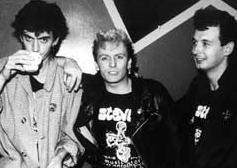
- The Shakin' Pyramids in Montreal, 1983 (l-r: Dave Duncan, James G. Creighton, Ken McLellan)

Background information
- Origin: Glasgow, Scotland
- Genres: Rockabilly; Rock and Roll
- Years active: 1980–1983
- Labels: Cuba Libre (Virgin Records); Scotti Brothers Records; Raucous Records
- Past members: Davie Duncan; James G. Creighton "Railroad" Ken McLellan

The Shakin' Pyramids (also known as Shakin' Pyramids) were a Scottish rockabilly band formed in Glasgow in 1980. The band consisted of Davie Duncan (vocals, harmonica, percussion) James G. Creighton (acoustic and electric guitar, vocals) and "Railroad" Ken McLellan (acoustic guitar, vocals).

During the band's recording career from 1980 to 1983, they released two studio albums, four singles, and three extended plays—the last of which was recorded with the British musician Lonnie Donegan. Although the Shakin' Pyramids did not enjoy any major chart successes, their output was well received by critics and has been described as having helped define the rockabilly revival of the early 1980s.

Creighton and Duncan died from strokes in 2021 and 2024, respectively.

== History ==
=== Busking ===
The Shakin' Pyramids formed in Glasgow in 1980, and began busking around the city. The band travelled internationally and were ultimately spotted playing outside a Virgin Megastore in London, which led to a deal with Cuba Libre, a subsidiary of Virgin Records.

=== Cuba Libre years ===
The Shakin' Pyramids' first song for Cuba Libre, "Reeferbilly Boogie", was recorded in 1980 on a four-track recorder at the Hellfire club in Glasgow, and was named "Single of the Week" by NME. Also that year the band played the Loch Lomond Festival, alongside the Jam, Stiff Little Fingers and the Tourists.

The group's first EP, entitled Take a Trip, was released the following year. The title track appeared on their debut album, entitled Skin 'Em Up (1981), which received 5/5 stars from Rolling Stone. AllMusic, who also praised the record, described it as having "helped define the short-lived rockabilly revival of the early '80s." The album was promoted by a single, "Tennessee Rock 'n 'Roll", which was also the title of an EP featuring single B-side "Alright Alnight" and two new tracks. Later in 1981, the band released a third and final EP in collaboration with musician Lonnie Donegan, who is described by the Guinness Book of British Hit Singles & Albums as "Britain's most successful and influential recording artist before the Beatles."

The band's second and final studio album, Celts and Cobras (1982) – on the cover of which they were billed as "Shakin' Pyramids" – was more diverse in its style but was seen as a departure from the group's original, immediate sound. Trouser Press declared that "The band still rocks, but they'd better figure out where they're going." "Pharaoh's Chant" was released as the album's first single, followed by "Just A Memory". The group ultimately disbanded in 1983, midway through a Canadian tour.

The Shakin' Pyramids played to audiences worldwide and made a number of television appearances during their short career. Ken Smith of The Herald described the band's oeuvre as being composed of "critically-acclaimed but modestly-selling records".

=== Subsequent releases ===
The Shakin' Pyramids (1983), a compilation album, was released shortly after the group's disbandment by Rock 'n Roll Records, a Scotti Brothers Records subsidiary. A live set recorded at the Kelvingrove Free Music Festival in Glasgow in May 1981 was released as Reeferbilly Blowout by Raucous Records in 2001.

=== Post-Shakin' Pyramids endeavours ===
In the mid-1980s Creighton played with the Fighting Fifty-First. In the 1990s he provided musicianship for the River Detectives and served as frontman of the Buicks. Creighton released two solo albums on Raucous during the 2010s; his third and final album was released via his own website in 2018. Creighton died from a stroke on 17 February 2021, aged 62.

Duncan and McLellan performed as the Véloniños with guitarist Laurie Cuffe and bassist Hugh Jamieson. Duncan died from a stroke in early June 2024, aged 65.

== Discography ==
=== Studio albums ===
- Skin 'Em Up (1981)
- Celts and Cobras (1982)

=== Extended plays ===
- Take a Trip (1981)
- Tennessee Rock 'n 'Roll (1981)
- The Shakin' Pyramids and Lonnie Donegan EP (1981)

=== Singles ===
- "Reeferbilly Boogie" (1980)
- "Tennessee Rock 'n 'Roll" (1981)
- "Just a Memory" (1982)
- "Pharaoh's Chant" (1982)

=== Compilation album ===
- The Shakin' Pyramids (1983)

=== Live album ===
- Reeferbilly Blowout (2001)
