= Reeferbilly Blowout =

Live album by The Shakin' Pyramids
- Released: 20 November 2001
- Recorded: 24 May 1981
- Genre: Rockabilly
- Label: Raucous Records (RAUCD101)

The Shakin' Pyramids chronology
The Shakin' Pyramids (1983)	Reeferbilly Blowout (2001)

Reeferbilly Blowout is a live album from the Scottish neo-rockabilly group The Shakin' Pyramids. It was recorded on 24 May 1981 at the Kelvingrove Free Music Festival in Glasgow.

== Personnel ==
- Davie Duncan – lead vocals
- James G. Creighton – guitar, background vocals
- "Railroad" Ken McLellan – guitar, background vocals

== Track listing ==
1. Teenage Boogie - 2:41
2. Tennessee Rock 'N' Roll - 2:35
3. Alright All Night - 3:30
4. Sixteen Chicks - 2:25
5. Shadow My Baby - 2:04
6. Pretty Bad Blues - 2:25
7. Wild Little Willie - 1:38
8. Wash Machine Boogie - 2:33
9. I Got a Baby - 3:44
