= Celts and Cobras =

1982 studio album by the Shakin' Pyramids

Studio album by The Shakin' Pyramids
- Released: 9 May 1982
- Studio: Basing Street Studios, London; The Workhouse Studios, London; AM-PRO Studios, London; Eden Studios, London; Rockfield Studios, Rockfield
- Genre: Rockabilly
- Label: Cuba Libre (Virgin)
- Producer: Bob Andrews (tracks 2, 4, 7 and 9), Roger Bechirian (all others)

The Shakin' Pyramids chronology
Skin 'Em Up (1981)	Celts and Cobras (1982)	The Shakin' Pyramids (1983)

Celts and Cobras is the second and final studio album from the Scottish neo-rockabilly group the Shakin' Pyramids (billed on the album cover as "Shakin' Pyramids"), released in 1982 by Cuba Libre, a subsidiary of Virgin Records. "Just a Memory" and "Pharaoh's Chant" were released as singles from the album. It features a more diverse instrumental palette than the band's debut album, Skin 'Em Up (1981), but was seen as a departure from the group's original, immediate sound.

== Reception ==
Professional ratings
Review scores
Source	Rating
AllMusic	3/5 stars

Celts and Cobras features more varied instrumentation than previous Shakin' Pyramids releases, but was seen as a departure from the band's original, immediate sound. Trouser Press said, "Celts and Cobras offers a higher percentage of their own songs, but on it they're accompanied by piano, accordion, electric bass and even — gack! — a string section... The band still rocks, but they'd better figure out where they're going." AllMusic gave the album 3/5 stars, and opined that "the energy and verve of their debut had been replaced by a stultifying maturity." Ethnomusicologist Craig Morrison wrote, "[Celts and Cobras] drifted farther from rockabilly as they broadened their horizons... One writer asked, "From neo-rockabilly to neo-schlock—is this neo-progress?"

== Track listing ==
Side A:

No.	Title	Length
1.	"Pharaoh's Chant"	2:42
2.	"Like Me With No-One"	3:48
3.	"Pretty Neat Come One"	2:56
4.	"Just A Memory"	2:29
5.	"Plainsailin'"	2:21
6.	"Sugar Bee"	2:15
7.	"Rockin' Mystique"	2:39

Side B:

No.	Title	Length
1.	"Quit And Split"	2:32
2.	"It Hurts To Be In Love"	2:26
3.	"You Can Bet"	1:37
4.	"Just Rockin'"	3:40
5.	"Ferocious"	2:00
6.	"Who Cares"	2:47
7.	"Reeferbilly Polka"	2:23

== Personnel ==
=== The Shakin' Pyramids ===
- Davie Duncan – Lead vocals, drums, percussion, tambourine
- James G. Creighton – Acoustic and electric guitar, acoustic bass, mandolin, background vocals
- "Railroad" Ken McLellan – Acoustic guitar, background vocals

=== Additional Personnel ===
- Bob Andrews: Piano, electric bass
- Geraint Watkins: Accordion
- Mitch Caws: Slap bass
- John Willoughby: Upright bass
- Andy Powell, Paul Hughes: Electric bass
- Strings arranged by Roy Clark
