= Gary Busey =

American actor (born 1944)

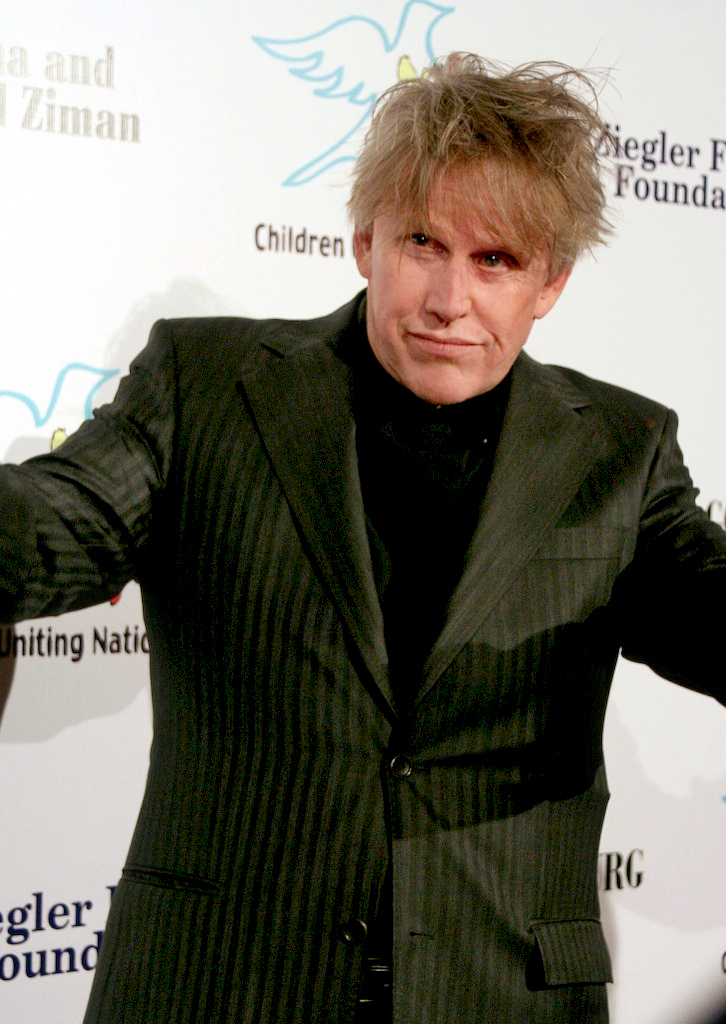
- Busey in 2008
- Born: William Gary Busey; June 29, 1944 (age 82); Goose Creek, Texas, U.S.
- Occupation: Actor
- Years active: 1967–present
- Spouses: Judy Helkenberg (m. 1968; div. 1990); Tiani Warden (m. 1996; div. 2001)
- Children: 3, including Jake

William Gary Busey (/ˈbjuːsi/; born June 29, 1944) is an American actor. He portrayed Buddy Holly in The Buddy Holly Story (1978), for which he was nominated for the Academy Award for Best Actor and won the National Society of Film Critics Award for Best Actor. His other starring roles include A Star Is Born (1976), D.C. Cab (1983), Silver Bullet (1985), Eye of the Tiger (1986), Lethal Weapon (1987), Hider in the House (1989), Predator 2 (1990), Point Break (1991), Under Siege (1992), The Firm (1993), Drop Zone (1994), Black Sheep (1996) and Lost Highway (1997).

== Early life ==
William Gary Busey was born on June 29, 1944, in Goose Creek, Texas, the son of Delmar Lloyd Busey and Sadie Virginia Busey (née Arnett). In 1952, Busey moved to Oklahoma City, Oklahoma before moving to Tulsa, Oklahoma in 1954 while in fourth grade. He later attended Bell Junior High School, then attended and graduated from Nathan Hale High School. Busey attended Coffeyville Community College before attending Pittsburg State University in Pittsburg, Kansas, on a football scholarship, where he became interested in acting. After a knee injury, he then transferred to Oklahoma State University in Stillwater, Oklahoma, to study theater. He quit school just one unit short of graduation.

== Career ==
=== Early career ===
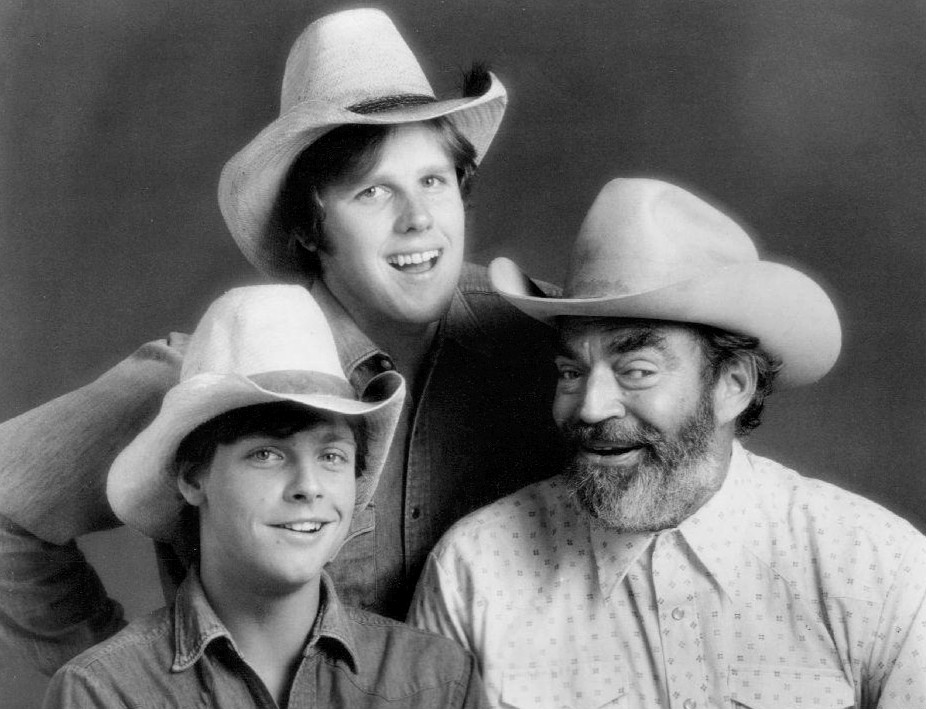
Busey (standing), Mark Hamill and Jack Elam from The Texas Wheelers, 1974

Busey began his showbusiness career as a drummer in the Rubber Band. He appears on several Leon Russell recordings, credited as playing drums under the name "Teddy Jack Eddy" a character he created when he was a cast member of a local television comedy show in Tulsa, Oklahoma, called The Uncanny Film Festival and Camp Meeting on station KTUL (which starred fellow Tulsan Gailard Sartain as "Dr. Mazeppa Pompazoidi"). For his skits on Uncanny Film Festival, Busey drew on his American Hero, belligerent, know-it-all character. When he told Gailard Sartain his character needed a name, Sartain replied, "Take three: Teddy, Jack and Eddy."

He played in a band called Carp, which released one album on Epic Records in 1969. Busey continued to play several small roles in both film and television during the 1970s. In 1975, as the character "Harvey Daley", he was the last person killed on the series Gunsmoke (in the third-to-last episode, No. 633 – "The Busters").

=== Rise to prominence ===
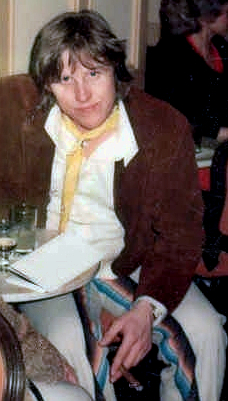
Busey at the premiere of A Star Is Born in 1976

In 1974, Busey played Truckie Wheeler in the ABC television comedy The Texas Wheelers. During that same year he made his major film debut with a supporting role in Michael Cimino's buddy action caper Thunderbolt and Lightfoot, starring Clint Eastwood and Jeff Bridges.

In 1976, he was hired by Barbra Streisand and her producer-boyfriend Jon Peters to play Bobby Ritchie, road manager to Kris Kristofferson's character in the remake film A Star Is Born. On the DVD commentary of the film, Streisand says Busey was great and that she had seen him on a TV series and thought he had the right qualities to play the role.

In 1978, he starred as rock legend Buddy Holly in The Buddy Holly Story with Sartain as The Big Bopper. For his performance, Busey received the greatest critical acclaim of his career and the movie earned an Academy Award nomination for Best Actor and the National Society of Film Critics' Best Actor award for him. In the same year he also starred in the small yet acclaimed drama Straight Time and the surfing movie Big Wednesday, which is now a minor cult classic.

=== Mid-career ===
In the 1980s, Busey's films included the critically acclaimed western Barbarosa (1982), the comedies D.C. Cab (1983) and Insignificance (1985), the Stephen King adaptation Silver Bullet (1985), and the action film Eye of the Tiger (1986). He played one of the primary antagonists opposite Mel Gibson and Danny Glover in the action comedy Lethal Weapon (1987). He also starred in the psychological thriller Hider in the House (1989).

In the 1990s, he had prominent supporting roles in successful action films such as Predator 2 (1990), Point Break (1991), Under Siege (1992), and Drop Zone (1994). He also appeared in The Player (1992), The Firm (1993), Rookie of the Year (1993), Black Sheep (1995), Lost Highway (1997), Fear and Loathing in Las Vegas (1998), and Soldier (1998).

Busey sang the song "Stay All Night" on Saturday Night Live in 1979 (season 4, episode 14), and on the Late Show with David Letterman in the 1990s.

In 2002, Busey voiced the character Phil Cassidy in the video game Grand Theft Auto: Vice City and later reprised the role in the prequel Grand Theft Auto: Vice City Stories in 2006. In 2003, he starred in a Comedy Central reality show, I'm with Busey. In 2005, he also voiced himself in an episode of The Simpsons and appeared in the popular miniseries Into the West. Busey controversially appeared in the 2006 Turkish nationalist film Valley of the Wolves: Iraq (Turkish: Kurtlar Vadisi: Irak), which was accused of fascism, anti-Americanism, and antisemitism.

Busey starred in the horror film The Gingerdead Man (2005) as the titular character and crazed killer Millard Findlemeyer. In 2007, he appeared as himself in a prominent recurring role on HBO's Entourage, in which he parodied his eccentric image, ultimately appearing on three episodes of the show. In 2008, he joined the second season of the reality show Celebrity Rehab with Dr. Drew. In 2009, Busey appeared as a roaster at the Comedy Central Roast of Larry the Cable Guy.

=== Later work ===
In a series of 2010 YouTube advertisements for Vitamin Water, Busey appeared as Norman Tugwater, a lawyer who defends professional athletes' entitlements to a cut from Fantasy Football team owners. Busey returned to reality television on The Celebrity Apprentice 4 in 2011, and appeared again in The Celebrity Apprentice 6. There, he briefly reprised his role as Buddy Holly by performing "Not Fade Away".

In 2014, he became a celebrity spokesperson for Amazon Fire TV. Also, that year, he appeared in and became the first American winner of Celebrity Big Brother 14. In 2015, he competed on the 21st season of Dancing with the Stars. He was paired with professional dancer Anna Trebunskaya. Busey and Trebunskaya made it to Week 4 of competition but were then eliminated and finished in 10th place.

In 2019, Busey starred as God in the Off-Broadway musical Only Human at the Theatre at St. Clements in New York. Directed by NJ Agwuna, the plot of Only Human reinterprets the story of Jesus and Lucifer as co-workers who don't get along, with God as "The Boss". In a statement on playing God in the upcoming production, he said, "God is everything love is and that love becomes the beginning of blessings and miracles. Playing this role of God is easy because I'm not acting, I'm just believing."

In the web series Gary Busey: Pet Judge (2020) he presided as a pet court show judge to help resolve problems.

== Personal life ==
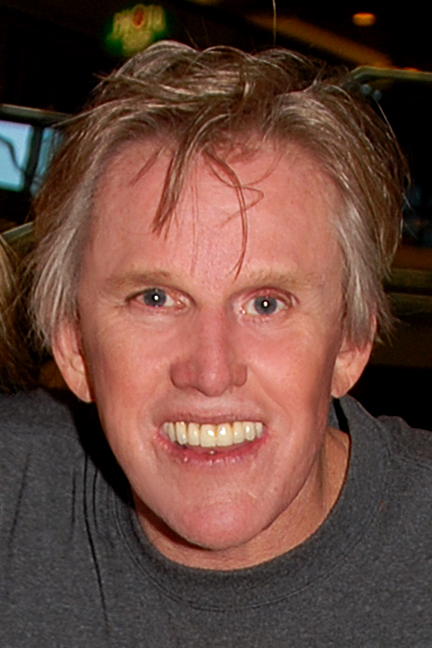
Busey in 2007

Busey has three children, including Jake. He has been married three times.

On December 4, 1988, Busey was severely injured in a motorcycle accident in which he was not wearing a helmet. His skull was fractured, and he suffered permanent brain damage. In an interview in 2020, Busey said that during the surgery following the accident he died and experienced many of the elements common to a near-death experience (NDE). "I was surrounded by angels. Balls of light floating all around me. And I felt trust, love, protection and happiness like you cannot feel on earth."

In 1996, Busey publicly announced that he was a Christian, saying "I am proud to tell Hollywood I am a Christian. For the first time I am now free to be myself." He cites the motorcycle accident and a 1995 cocaine overdose as events that strengthened his Christian faith.

In 1997, Busey underwent successful surgery to remove a plum-sized cancerous tumor from his sinus cavity. The growth was found after he began suffering nose bleeds.

During the filming of the second season of Celebrity Rehab in 2008, Busey was referred to psychiatrist Charles Sophy. Sophy suspected that Busey's brain injury had had a greater effect on him than was realized. He described it as essentially weakening Busey's mental "filters", which led him to speak and act impulsively. Sophy recommended Busey take valproic acid (Depakote), and Busey agreed.

In 2011, Busey endorsed Newt Gingrich during Gingrich's 2012 presidential campaign, but later withdrew his endorsement. In 2015, he endorsed Donald Trump for the 2016 United States presidential election. After the election, Busey said he was "very happy" that Trump had won, but declined to further discuss it, not wanting to talk about politics.

In 2022, Busey was accused of groping two women during a convention appearance in Cherry Hill, New Jersey. On July 31, 2025, he pleaded guilty to one count of criminal sexual contact. He was sentenced on September 18, 2025, to two years' probation.

== Filmography ==
=== Selected filmography ===
- Wild in the Streets (1968)
- Angels Hard as They Come (1971)
- The Magnificent Seven Ride! (1972)
- Dirty Little Billy (1972)
- The Last American Hero (1973)
- Hex (1973)
- Thunderbolt and Lightfoot (1974)
- The Gumball Rally (1976)
- A Star Is Born (1976)
- Straight Time (1978)
- The Buddy Holly Story (1978)
- Big Wednesday (1978)
- Carny (1980)
- Foolin' Around (1980)
- Barbarosa (1982)
- D.C. Cab (1983)
- Insignificance (1985)
- Silver Bullet (1985)
- Eye of the Tiger (1986)
- Lethal Weapon (1987)
- Predator 2 (1990)
- Point Break (1991)
- Under Siege (1992)
- The Firm (1993)
- Rookie of the Year (1993)
- Surviving the Game (1994)
- Drop Zone (1994)
- Black Sheep (1996)
- Lost Highway (1997)
- Soldier (1998)
- Fear and Loathing in Las Vegas (1998)
- Hot Boyz (1999)
- Quigley (2003)
- Piranha 3DD (2012)
- Entourage (2015)

== Awards and nominations ==
Year	Association	Category	Work	Result
1978	Los Angeles Film Critics Association	Best Actor	The Buddy Holly Story	3rd place
1978	Los Angeles Film Critics Association	New Generation Award	The Buddy Holly Story	Won
1978	New York Film Critics Circle	Best Actor	The Buddy Holly Story	2nd place
1979	Academy Awards	Best Actor in a Leading Role	The Buddy Holly Story	Nominated
1979	Golden Globe Awards	Best Motion Picture Actor – Musical/Comedy	The Buddy Holly Story	Nominated
1979	National Society of Film Critics	Best Actor	The Buddy Holly Story	Won
1980	British Academy of Film and Television Arts	Most Promising Newcomer to Leading Film Roles	The Buddy Holly Story	Nominated
1987	CableACE Awards	Actor in a Dramatic Series	The Hitchhiker	Won
1994	CableACE Awards	Actor in a Dramatic Series	Fallen Angels	Nominated
