= Premonition (Survivor album) =

Studio album by Survivor
- Released: October 1981 (US)
- Recorded: 1981
- Studio: Rumbo Recorders (Los Angeles)
- Genre: Rock
- Length: 32:09
- Label: Scotti Bros.
- Producers: Frankie Sullivan, Jim Peterik

Survivor chronology
Survivor (1979)	Premonition (1981)	Eye of the Tiger (1982)

Singles from Premonition
- 1. "Summer Nights" Released: August 1981 (US); 2. "Poor Man's Son" Released: October 1981 (US)

Premonition is the second album by American rock band Survivor, released in October 1981 in the United States and February 1982 elsewhere. It was the first album to use the Survivor script logo.

The album, along with many other Survivor albums, was briefly taken out of print in 2009, but was remastered and reissued the following year and distributed by Rock Candy Records. The album includes the singles "Summer Nights" (#62, US Chart) and "Poor Man's Son" (#33, US Chart), one of the songs that would be part of their live set list. A song titled "Missing Persons" was recorded for the album but left out from the final cut.

== Track listing ==
All tracks are written by Jim Peterik and Frankie Sullivan, except where noted.

Side one
No.	Title	Writer(s)	Length
1.	"Chevy Nights"	Peterik	3:38
2.	"Summer Nights"		4:08
3.	"Poor Man's Son"		3:35
4.	"Runway Lights"		4:17

Side two
No.	Title	Writer(s)	Length
5.	"Take You on a Saturday"		4:05
6.	"Light of a Thousand Smiles"	Peterik	4:58
7.	"Love Is on My Side"		3:36
8.	"Heart's a Lonely Hunter"		5:12
Total length:			32:09

== Personnel ==
Survivor

- Dave Bickler – lead vocals, synthesizers
- Jim Peterik – keyboards, rhythm guitar, backing vocals
- Frankie Sullivan – lead guitar, backing vocals
- Stephan Ellis – bass
- Marc Droubay – drums

Additional musicians

- Daryl Dragon – additional keyboards

Production

- Jim Peterik – producer
- Frankie Sullivan – producer
- Artie Kornfeld – co-producer (1, 2), production assistant
- Artie Ripp – co-producer (1, 2)
- Phil Bonanno – production assistant, engineer, mixing
- Brad Cicotti – engineer
- Les Cooper – engineer
- Doug Sax – mastering
- Michael Kevin Lee – art direction, design, graphics
- Veronica Sim – photography

Studios

- Recorded at Rumbo Recorders (Los Angeles, California).
- Mixed at Fidelity Studios (North Hollywood, California).
- Mastered at The Mastering Lab (Hollywood, California).

== Charts ==
Chart (1981)	Peak position
US Billboard 200	82
