= Big Ric =

Rock and power pop band

- Origin: Los Angeles, California
- Genres: Hard rock, pop rock, power pop, new wave
- Years active: 1982-1983
- Labels: Scotti Bros. Records; Rock 'n Roll Records
- Past members: Joel Porter; Bud Harner; John Pondel; Kevin DiSimone

Big Ric was a short-lived rock and power pop band from Los Angeles, California. The band was formed in 1982 by lead singer Joel Porter. Keyboardist Kevin DiSimone previously did work on some of Barry Manilow's albums such as co-writing the song "Stay" from Manilow's album Here Comes the Night. Guitarist John Pondel also worked with Manilow as he played guitar on Manilow's album If I Should Love Again. The band released one self-titled album in 1983. A single from the album, "Take Away", charted at number 91 on the Billboard Hot 100 in late 1983. The band additionally released two more singles, "Diana" and "How Does She Do It", the latter of which was released as a promotional single. "Take Away" was accompanied by a nighttime restaurant and telephone call spy and espionage mystery themed music video (along with scenes of the band playing in some sort of house on a small stage) which received play on MTV and later MTV2.

== Charts ==
List of singles, with selected chart positions
Year	Title	Peak chart positions	Album
Year	Title	US	Album
1983	"Take Away"	91	Big Ric
1983	"Diana"	-	non album single
1983	"How Does She Do It"	-	Big Ric
