= Stage Directors and Choreographers Society =

American labor union

SDC
- Stage Directors and Choreographers Society
- Founded: 1959
- Headquarters: 321 West 44th Street, Suite 804; New York, New York 10036
- Location: United States
- Members: 1,978 (full members); 665 ("associate members") (2013)
- Key people: Evan Yionoulis, Executive Board President; Laura Penn, Executive Director
- Website: www.sdcweb.org

The Stage Directors and Choreographers Society (SDC), formerly known as Society of Stage Directors and Choreographers (SDC), is an independent national labor union established in 1959, representing theatrical directors and choreographers working on Broadway, National Tours, off-Broadway, and in various resident, regional, and stock theatres throughout the United States.

SDC collectively bargains contracts with producers, creating the national standards for stage direction and choreography. SDC's executive board consists of 34 directors and choreographers working across the country. Twenty-nine Board members serve at-large and five board members serve as Regional Representatives, charged with serving the interests of their region as part of their executive board service. Regional Reps are voted on by the entire Membership. SDC's regions include Northeast, Southeast, Central, Western, and Northwest.

Currently, the president of the executive board is Evan Yionoulis and the Union's Executive Director is Laura Penn. SDC is based in NYC, where it has been based since 2015.

== Purpose ==
Membership (US records)
View chart definition.
Finances (US records; ×$1000)
View chart definition.

Professional stage directors and choreographers become Members of SDC in order to unite with one another, collectively bargain for better terms and working conditions, and be legally protected in their work. SDC collectively bargains agreements with employers, creating the national standards for the employment of stage directors and choreographers.

SDC covers the employment of directors and choreographers under Collectively Bargained Agreements in the following jurisdictions: Broadway, National Tours, Off-Broadway, Association of Non-Profit Theatre Companies in New York City (ANTC), League of Resident Theatres (LORT), Council of Resident Stock Theatres (CORST), Traditional Summer Sock (TSS), New England Area Theatre (NEAT), Regional Musical Theatre (RMT), and Outdoor Musical Stock (OMS).

SDC also provides Tier, Regional Commercial, Development, and Special contracts to protect Members who wish to work for theatres or producers not covered by or referenced to one of the above-mentioned Collectively Bargained Agreements. In addition, SDC negotiates Independent Producer Agreements with individual theatres, some of which reference a collectively bargained agreement listed above, while others are unique to a specific organization such as Steppenwolf, Chicago Shakespeare Theatre, New York Stage and Film, or The Eugene O’Neill Theater Center, to name a few.

In recent years, SDC has expanded its jurisdiction to cover the employment of Fight Choreographers and Associate/Resident Directors and Choreographers in several of the above jurisdictions.

== Composition ==
According to SDC's reports to the Department of Labor, the union is composed of “Members” and “Associate Members,” with the latter ineligible to vote in the Union.

Members are required to file contracts for all work as theatrical directors and choreographers. Full Members enjoy all the protections of contract filing, may participate in the negotiation of collectively bargained agreements, vote in Union elections and referendums, and can qualify for health and pension coverage through the SDC-League Pension and Health Funds.

Associate Members may not file contracts unless compelled to by the union security provisions in an employer's collectively bargained agreement. Associate Members benefit from their association with SDC as a declaration of their professional standing within the theatrical community. Associate Members may contact the SDC Contract Affairs Department with any employment questions they have about their individual agreements.

All Members can engage in the national conversation about the crafts of direction and choreography through SDC Journal, stay up-to-date on Union business through the SDC monthly E-News, attend Membership Meetings, receive national discounts and offers on goods and services, and reserve conference room space in the SDC office.

In order to become a Member of SDC, you must apply for Membership via their online application on their website. The full Member initiation fee is $2,000 and the annual dues are $240. (Payments plans are available for the full Member initiation fee.) The Associate Member initiation fee is $325 and the annual dues are $75. Since 2005, when Membership classifications were first reported, the percentage of total membership considered “Associate Members” has grown from 18% to TK%, TK of the Union.

== SDC Foundation ==
Founded in 1965, Stage Directors and Choreographers Foundation (SDCF), the nonprofit of SDC, is the only service organization in the U.S. with a sole focus of providing resources to directors and choreographers. Its mission is to celebrate, develop, and support professional stage directors and choreographers throughout every phase of their careers. SDCF supports the building of a theatrical community that reflects the cultural, racial, and gender diversity of the nation by creating opportunities for artists of all backgrounds to bring their full, authentic selves to their work as creative leaders in the theatre. Guided by SDCF's core values, the organization creates access to the field for early- and mid- career directors and choreographers; facilitates much-needed connection amongst artists and with the public; and offers unique platforms to honor the field's artistic leaders. SDCF's vision is achieved through programs such as the Professional Development Program, the Lloyd Richards New Futures Residency, public panels, podcasts, and networking opportunities. Awards at SDCF include the Mr. Abbott Award, Gordon Davidson Award, Joe. A Callaway Awards, Zelda Fichandler Award, Barbara Whitman Award, Breakout Award, and Abe Burrows Award.

=== Barbara Whitman Award ===
Endowed by Barbara Whitman and first awarded in 2021, it is awarded annually to a female, transgender or non-binary candidate and comprises a cash prize of $10,000 for the winner. The inaugural winner in 2021 was Sharifa Yazmeen. Subsequent winners have been: NJ Agwuna in 2022; Elena Velasco in 2023; Rebecca Aparicio in 2024; Autumn Angelettie in 2025.

== Publications ==
SDCF also publishes "The Journal for Stage Directors and Choreographers" and "The Stage Directors Handbook."

== History ==
SDC was founded in 1959 by director Shepard Traube (1907–1983) along with TK others who united to create a theatrical labor union devoted to empowering stage directors and choreographers. Among the other founders were Abe Burrows, Harold Clurman, Agnes de Mille, Bob Fosse, Hanya Holm, Elia Kazan, and Stuart Vaughan. Shepard Traube was elected as the first President of the executive board. Since then, there have been TK other presidents and executive directors of the Union.

In 1962, when Bob Fosse withheld his services on a production of Little Me, Broadway producers were forced to recognize the Union. In a case against producer Jay Julien, litigated for eight years and decided in 1975, SDC won the important distinction that its Members are employees. This landmark decision was a tremendous victory for the Union and set the precedent on which SDC continues to base its existence.

SDC has tackled the complex issue of intellectual property rights with such cases as Gerald Gutierrez's The Most Happy Fella (1994), Joe Mantello's Love! Valour! Compassion! (1997), and John Rando and John Carrafa's Urinetown (2006). These cases signified major achievements in the Union's fight for directorial and choreographic intellectual property rights recognition.

In 2016, SDC joined the Department for Professional Employees, AFL–CIO, a coalition of national unions representing more than four million professional and technical workers, and serves as an active member of the Arts and Entertainment and Media Industry Coordinating Committee (AEMI).

In October 2020, SDC and SDCF released On the Edge: The Lives and Livelihoods of Stage Directors and Choreographers...A Next Stage Report, a two-year, three-phased research project that examined the lives and livelihoods of stage directors and choreographers before and amid the COVID-19 crisis.

During the Next Stage project's first two phases, SDC worked with the Network for Culture & Arts Policy (NCAP) to design and deploy comprehensive surveys for distribution to SDC's Membership. A first survey, concerning how directors and choreographers earn a living and what resources are available to them, was deployed in fall 2019. A second survey, deployed in June 2020, included questions exploring the financial and emotional impact of the COVID-19 pandemic, the field's response to the calls for racial justice, and the resources needed to reopen the industry in an equitable, just, and sustainable way. In the third phase of the project, SDC analyzed the race, ethnicity, and gender demographics of the Membership in the SDC database in connection with the SDC contracts filed across jurisdictions—including Broadway, Off-Broadway, and LORT (League of Resident Theatres)—over a five-year period.

== SDC + COVID-19 ==
In response to COVID-19, SDC collaborated with the American Guild of Musical Artists (AGMA) and an Expert Medical Advisory Panel (Dr. Mark Cunningham-Hill, Dr. Steven J. Anderson, and Dr. Laurie S. Welch) to develop safety protocols for employers to ensure artists are protected when returning to work. This successful collaboration led to the publication of the acclaimed AGMA/SDC Return to Stage and Performing Arts Playbook (currently in its fourth revision); ongoing Special Guidance Updates; and a COVID-19 response webinar series. In February, 2022, Actors’ Equity Association announced that they engaged the same team of scientists as public health consultants—thereby creating more consistency in safety protocols across the industry.

At the beginning of the pandemic, the SDC Executive Board established a “Capture Committee” in response to increased remote work and capture activity. The Union created the new “Remote Work Contract” and “Digital Stage Production Agreement” to ensure that its Members had access to Union protection when working in the digital realm. SDC engaged with its bargaining partners to ensure SDC Members employed for digital productions received SDC coverage, regardless of which union contracts the actors received (Equity, SAG-AFTRA, or none).

Throughout the pandemic, SDC has been steadfast in its endeavor to elevate the profile of stage directors and choreographers by setting new standards for the capture of live stage productions, including fair compensation, prominent billing, collaboration with the Camera Director, and consultation on captured material prior to distribution. Due to SDC's efforts, since March 2020, SDC Members have earned more than $1.2 million in compensation for electronic capture activity. More than $250,000 in benefit contributions have been made to the SDC-League Pension and Health Funds.

== See also ==
- Actors' Equity Association
- Directors Guild of America
