= NJ Agwuna =

American theatre director

- Occupations: Theatre director; intimacy coordinator
- Website: https://www.njagwuna.com/

NJ Agwuna is an American theatre director and intimacy coordinator, whose works engage with the themes of trauma and mental health. Her direction of the 2019 production of Till - a musical play based on the life of Emmett Till - was described by The New York Times as "beautifully cast and sensitively directed". The same year she was the director of the 2019 production of Only Human, which starred Gary Busey as God.

In 2021 she directed Mozart's The Magic Flute as part of the Glimmerglass Festival. This was funded by a grant from Opera America to advance gender parity within opera. In 2023 she directed the opera The Coronation of Poppaea by Monteverdi. Her direction was praised by the San Francisco Chronicle for its setting of the opera "in a world of tabloid headlines", a focus on the overlap between the public and private in Ancient Rome and its reflections on politics and desire.

In 2022 she was the winner of the Barbara Whitman Award for direction.
