= Survivor (Survivor album) =

Studio album by Survivor
- Released: December 21, 1979
- Recorded: 1979
- Studios: The Record Plant Studio C (Los Angeles, California); Little Mountain Sound Studios (Vancouver, British Columbia)
- Genre: Rock
- Length: 40:29
- Label: Scotti Bros.
- Producers: Ron Nevison, Barry Mraz

Survivor chronology
Survivor (1979)	Premonition (1981)

Singles from Survivor
- 1. "Somewhere in America" Released: February 1980 (US)

Professional ratings
Review scores
Source	Rating
AllMusic	3/5 stars

Survivor is the first album by the American rock band Survivor, recorded and released in 1979. It is the band's only album with its original drummer, Gary Smith, and bass guitarist, Dennis Keith Johnson. The recording sessions, overseen by the A&R executive John Kalodner, were not without difficulties. First, Ron Nevison replaced Barry Mraz as producer, and then the project had to be taken to Bruce Fairbairn in Vancouver to achieve a mix that was to Kalodner's satisfaction. The album took eight months to finally be released.

The album just entered the charts, reaching #169 on the Billboard 200 in the spring of 1980, but the opening track, "Somewhere in America", peaked at #70 on the Billboard Hot 100 and "Youngblood", with its dramatic guitar introduction, proved to be something of a blueprint for the band's smash hit two years later, "Eye of the Tiger".

An additional song recorded for the album, "Rockin' into the Night", was rejected by Nevison as "too Southern". It was given to 38 Special who turned the song into a hit. The original Survivor recording became available in 2004 on the compilation Ultimate Survivor.

The single "Rebel Girl" was recorded about a year after the album sessions, though the Japanese release of the album on CD includes it as song number six. The 2010 reissue on Rock Candy Records adds the song as a bonus track.

The model on the cover of the album is the actress Kim Basinger, according to the band's founding member Jim Peterik.

== Track listing ==
Side one
No.	Title	Writer(s)	Length
1.	"Somewhere in America"	Jim Peterik	5:13
2.	"Can't Getcha Offa My Mind"	Peterik; Frankie Sullivan	3:00
3.	"Let It Be Now"	Peterik; Sullivan	3:39
4.	"As Soon As Love Finds Me"	Dennis Keith Johnson; Peterik; Gary Smith; Sullivan	2:52
5.	"Youngblood"	Johnson; Peterik; Sullivan	3:31

Side two
No.	Title	Writer(s)	Length
6.	"Love Has Got Me"	Peterik	3:38
7.	"Whole Town's Talkin'"	Johnson; Peterik; Smith; Sullivan	3:32
8.	"20/20"	Johnson; Peterik; Smith; Sullivan	3:23
9.	"Freelance"	Johnson; Peterik; Sullivan	3:37
10.	"Nothing Can Shake Me (From Your Love)"	Peterik	4:09
11.	"Whatever It Takes"	Johnson; Peterik; Smith; Sullivan	3:46
Total length:			40:29

No.	Title	Writer(s)	Length
12.	"Rebel Girl" (bonus track on Japanese edition and Rock Candy reissue)	Peterik; Smith	3:50

== Personnel ==
Personnel taken from Survivor liner notes.

Survivor

- Dave Bickler – lead vocals, keyboards
- Frankie Sullivan – lead guitar, backing vocals
- Jim Peterik – guitar, lead vocals on "Love Has Got Me"
- Dennis Keith Johnson – bass guitar, Moog bass pedals
- Gary Smith – drums, percussion

Production

- Ron Nevison – producer
- Barry Mraz – producer
- Bruce Fairbairn – recording engineer, mix assistant
- Jim Peterik – recording engineer, mix assistant
- Mike Clink – assistant engineer
- Bob Rock – mixing
- Mike Salisbury – art direction, album design
- Mark Feldman – cover photography

== Charts ==
Chart (1980)	Peak position
US Billboard 200	169
