= He's My Girl =

- Directed by: Gabrielle Beaumont
- Written by: Taylor Ames; Peter Bergman; Charles F. Bohl; Myrica Taylor; Terence H. Winkless
- Produced by: Lawrence Mortorff; Angela P. Schapiro
- Starring: T. K. Carter; David Hallyday
- Cinematography: Peter Lyons Collister
- Music by: Roger Webb
- Distributed by: Scotti Brothers Pictures
- Release date: 1987
- Running time: 104 minutes
- Language: English

He's My Girl is a 1987 American comedy film directed by Gabrielle Beaumont and starring David Hallyday and T. K. Carter.

== Plot ==
Bryan (David Hallyday) is a singer, and his best friend Reggie (T. K. Carter) is his manager. They both reside in Missouri. In order to help advance his music career, Reggie enters Bryan into a competition to win a trip to L.A. Bryan wins, but he has to bring a girl with him. In order to go, Reggie poses as a girl.

When the couple arrive in L.A., Bryan falls for Lisa (Jennifer Tilly), while Reggie falls for Tasha (Misha McK). They both find themselves pursuing their love while having to maintain their cover. Things comically go wrong, and they have to clear up the mess that ensues.

== Cast ==
- T. K. Carter as Reggie/Regina
- David Hallyday as Bryan
- Misha McK as Tasha
- Warwick Sims as Simon Sledge
- Jennifer Tilly as Lisa
- Monica Parker as Sally
- Bibi Besch as Marcia
- David Clennon as Mason Morgan
- Robert Clotworthy as Jeffrey

== Music ==
The movie's theme song, "He's My Girl", sung by Hallyday, was released as a single in August 1987. It reached #79 on the US Billboard Hot 100 and #72 on Cash Box.

== Reception ==
Rita Kempley of The Washington Post said, "The gender-bender "He's My Girl" is all cross-dressed up with nowhere to go. It's a farce so stale the only thing to do is make croutons."

Janet Maslin of The New York Times wrote "He's My Girl is at least made relatively painless by Mr. Carter, who is happily overconfident and even convincing in his role. Beyond that, the film has little to recommend it."
