= Stephan Ellis =

American musician (died 2019)

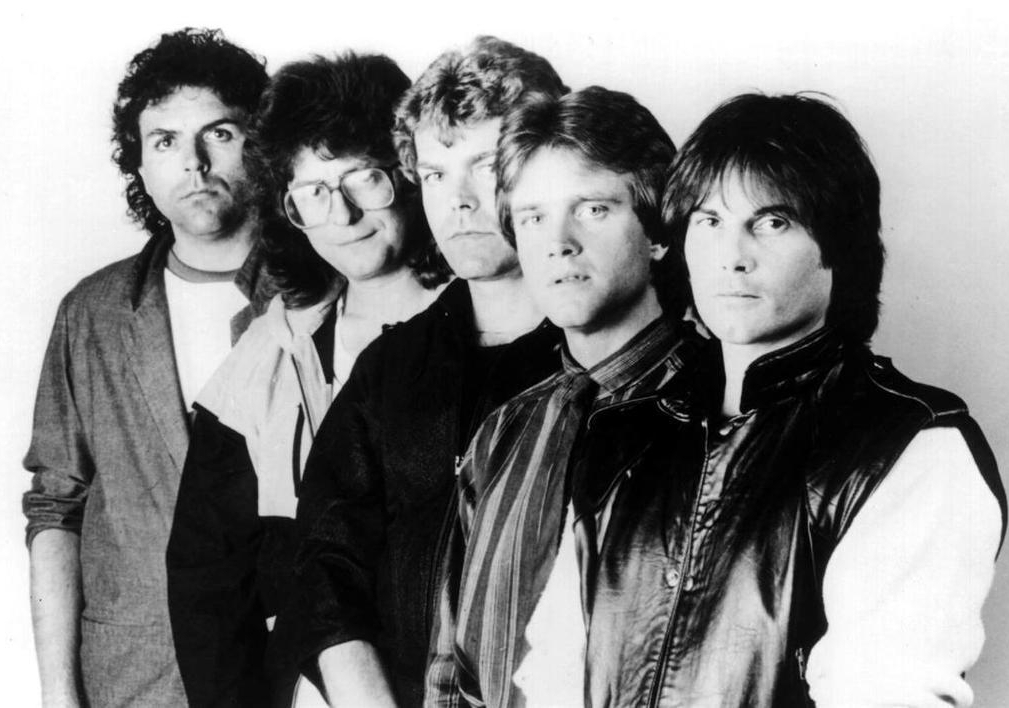
- Survivor in 1984, Ellis in the middle

Background information
- Died: February 28, 2019
- Instrument: Bass
- Formerly of: Survivor

Stephan Ellis (died February 28, 2019) was an American bassist. He was the bassist for Survivor from 1981 to 1999.

== Biography ==
Elis joined Survivor in 1981 to record their second album, Premonition. A year later, they recorded the Grammy winning song "Eye of the Tiger" for the film Rocky III. In 1987, he developed stomach ulcers and was forced to leave the band while he recovered. After leaving Survivor, Ellis and Survivor member Marc Droubay, formed a group called Club M.E.D., who released one album for disbanding. He returned to Survivor in 1996 but left again three years later but returned as a substitute in 2005. Ellis also played bass on David Glen Eisley's 2000 album Stranger From the Past and in 2005 produced Samantha Fox's album Angel with an Attitude.

Ellis died on February 28, 2019. He was 69. His official cause of death was not confirmed but he had dementia. Survivor member Frankie Sullivan called Ellis "a special charm with the fans and within the band" and Jim Peterik said his death "hit me like a shot".
