= America's Top 10 =

1980 American TV program

- Genre: Music chart show
- Based on: American Top 40
- Presented by: Casey Kasem (1980–1992); Siedah Garrett (1990–1991); Tommy Puett (1991–1992)
- Country of origin: United States
- Original language: English

Production
- Producer: Syd Vinnedge
- Production companies: Kasem-Bustany Productions (1980–1984); Casey Kasem Productions (1984–1992); Scotti Brothers-Syd Vinnedge Television (1980–1986); Scotti-Vinnedge Television (1986–1992)

Original release
- Network: First-run syndication
- Release: 1980 – 1992

America's Top 10 (commonly abbreviated to AT10) was a popular weekly syndicated music television chart show that began airing in 1980 and ran until 1992.

The show was hosted by Casey Kasem throughout its run, with Charlie Tuna announcing. In later years, Siedah Garrett and Tommy Puett would often host the show from the studio, with Kasem performing interviews and regular segments "on the road". Martha Quinn filled in for Kasem in two 1988 episodes. The program was a production of Kasem-Bustany Productions in association with Scotti Brothers-Syd Vinnedge Television, with distribution initially handled by Gold Key Media; the show eventually fell under the auspices of All American Television, the successor to both Scotti-Vinnedge and Gold Key Media. (All American eventually folded into what is now Fremantle.)

The show was also popular internationally, eventually being syndicated for broadcast around Europe in the mid-1980s. From around 1987 onwards, the show was transmitted by various regions of the ITV network in the United Kingdom, where it was broadcast as part of the network's then-new overnight service, ITV Night Time; repeats were also screened in a Saturday lunchtime slot on ITV, just after ITV's own flagship weekly syndicated music series The Chart Show, from 1989 until 1992.

Charlie Tuna served as announcer, and Syd Vinnedge was producer.

== Format ==
Much like American Top 40, America's Top 10 counted down the top 10 pop songs of the past week. Because of the 30-minute format of the show, Kasem would highlight one song from the pop, R&B, country, and album charts, airing one music video from three of these charts. He would sometimes venture into other chart genres as well – such as Christmas or dance or disco – if there was an interesting chart feat taking place. A few times, interviews with artists from various music genres would also be shown.

In the first year, a generic music bed would be used behind Casey's voice as the Top 10 pop songs were announced, one by one. Later years, snippets of the actual song would be used behind his voice. The other Top 10 charts would normally not be announced song by song, but rather Casey would highlight several of the specific songs within each Top 10. The songs highlighted would be based on chart movements or interesting chart feats for that week.

=== Source material ===
Since Kasem was already using Billboard as the chart source for his radio show American Top 40, the magazine served as the source material for all of the charts featured on America's Top 10. This practice continued after Kasem left that program to host Casey's Top 40, which used the chart published in the weekly trade newspaper Radio & Records. Kasem would eventually begin using the same chart source on television as well.

=== "Should've Been a Top 10 Hit" ===
Like AT40, America's Top 10 also had extras, one of the more common being the "Should've Been a Top 10 Hit". In this feature, Casey would pick out a song that never made it to the Top 10 (which could be any song that peaked no higher than #11), but that he felt should have, based on a number of different things. He would justify why he felt it should have been a Top 10 hit as the video for the song was played. He would end the segment by repeating the name of the song and say what position it peaked at; "That's (song title) by (artist). A number XX song that should've been a top ten hit."

Other notable features during AT10's run included "Pop Music in the News" and "Pop Music Trivia", in which Casey answered trivia questions sent in by viewers each week.
