= Tu ne m'as pas laissé le temps =

Single by David Hallyday

from the album Un Paradis / Un Enfer
- B-side: "Un Petit Peu de toi"
- Released: 2 June 1999
- Genre: Pop
- Length: 4:23
- Label: Mercury, Universal Music
- Songwriters: Lionel Florence; David Hallyday

David Hallyday singles chronology
"Hold on Blue Eyes" (1992)	"Tu ne m'as pas laissé le temps" (1999)	"Pour toi" (1999)

"Tu ne m'as pas laissé le temps" is a 1999 song recorded by French artist David Hallyday. It was the lead single from his album Un Paradis / Un Enfer, released about two weeks after the single, in June 1999. It was a hit in France (a number-one single) and Belgium (Wallonia) and remains to date David Hallyday's most successful single.

== Song information ==
The music was composed by the singer himself, while the lyrics were written by Lionel Florence, a composer who had previously worked with many artists such as Alain Chamfort, Faudel, Florent Pagny, Jane Birkin, Pascal Obispo and Patricia Kaas (later, it has also composed for Nolwenn Leroy, Natasha St-Pier and many others). The song is dedicated to Hallyday's grandfather and he addresses directly to him in the lyrics.

The song brings emotion "on a spontaneous mode which uses its most forceful sentences from the universe of the children : constructions inspired by the spoken language which break the semantic rules, idealistic oaths as much as solemn". The music seems to express both nostalgy and regrets, created by the guitar in the introduction and the violins in the refrains.

"Tu ne m'as pas laissé le temps" is also available on many French compilations, such as Hit Connection – Best Of 1999, Hit Express 8, La Discothèque du XXè siècle, Lionel Florence: des rencontres et des mots (2002) and Hits de diamant (2007).

The song was awarded the Price Vincent Scotto by the SACEM.

In 2006, the song was covered by Chimène Badi, Liane Foly, Maurane and Yannick Noah. Their version was included as tenth track of the first CD on Les Enfoirés' album Le Village des Enfoirés.

== Chart performance ==
In France, the song went to number eight on the SNEP singles chart, on 5 June 1999, three days after its release. It stayed for twenty consecutive weeks in the top ten, including a peak at top in the sixth week. Thereafter, the song dropped, first slowly, then quickly and remained in the top 50 for 29 weeks and in the top 100 for 30 weeks.

In Belgium (Wallonia), the single ranked on the Ultratop 40 for 26 weeks. It debuted at number 26 on 19 June 1999, climbed rather quickly and eventually peaked at number two on 7 August. The song managed to stayed for 16 weeks in the top seven, then dropped regularly.

== Track listings ==
- CD single
1. "Tu ne m'as pas laissé le temps" – 4:23
2. "Un Petit Peu de toi" – 3:59

== Charts ==
=== Weekly charts ===
Chart (1999)	Peak position
Belgian (Wallonia) Singles Chart	2
French SNEP Singles Chart	1
Quebec (ADISQ)	19

=== Year-end charts ===
Chart (1999)	Position
Belgian (Wallonia) Singles Chart	7
French Singles Chart	6

== Certifications ==
Certifications for "Tu ne m'as pas laissé le temps"
Region	Certification	Certified units/sales
France (SNEP)	Diamond	750,000^{*}
^{*} Sales figures based on certification alone.
