= Gravity (James Brown album) =

Studio album by James Brown
- Released: September 15, 1986
- Recorded: 1985–86
- Studios: Unique Recording Studios, New York City
- Genre: Funk
- Length: 39:40
- Label: Scotti Bros. Records
- Producer: Dan Hartman

James Brown chronology
Bring It On! (1983)	Gravity (1986)	I'm Real (1988)

Singles from Gravity
- 1. "Living in America" Released: December 1985; 2. "Gravity" Released: 1986; 3. "How Do You Stop" Released: January 1987

Gravity is the 53rd studio album by American musician James Brown. The album was released on September 15, 1986, by Scotti Bros. Records. It was largely written and produced by Dan Hartman and Charlie Midnight, the authors of the album's previously released hit single "Living in America", which had reached #4 on the Billboard Hot 100 and was prominently featured in the film Rocky IV. It was Brown's first album for the Scotti Brothers record label.

The album's title track became a minor hit on both the pop and R&B charts, while the tango-based slow jam "How Do You Stop" cracked the R&B top ten. The album track "Turn Me Loose, I'm Dr. Feelgood" was used as the theme song for the Australian TV sketch comedy series The Late Show (1992–93) and is often played by Major League Baseball's Philadelphia Phillies when one of their batters hits a home run at Citizens Bank Park.

== Reception ==
Professional ratings
Review scores
Source	Rating
AllMusic	3/5 stars
Record Mirror	4/5 stars
Robert Christgau	C+
The Rolling Stone Album Guide	3.5/5 stars
The Milwaukee Sentinel	(favorable)

Gravity earned a lukewarm reception from critics. Robert Christgau went so far as to describe it as "[n]ot a James Brown album--a James Brown-influenced Dan Hartman record, with James Brown on vocals", and urged readers to seek out recent reissues of Brown's earlier work instead. Ron Wynn of Allmusic.com described the album as "moderately interesting" but that, ultimately, Brown was trying to "catch up" with contemporary trends. Brown himself stated that the album was "'about 10 percent of James Brown. This is about as real James Brown as we’re gonna put on (producer) Dan Hartman’s album.'' Nevertheless, Brown did praise Hartman and Midnight for capturing the essence of his style in "Living in America".

== Track listing ==
All tracks are written by Dan Hartman and Charlie Midnight, except "Let's Get Personal," by Hartman, Midnight and Alison Moyet.

No.	Title	Length
1.	"Gravity"	5:58
2.	"Let's Get Personal"	4:29
3.	"How Do You Stop"	4:49
4.	"Turn Me Loose, I'm Dr. Feelgood"	3:09
5.	"Living in America"	5:57
6.	"Goliath"	6:14
7.	"Repeat the Beat (Faith)"	4:20
8.	"Return to Me"	4:39

=== 2012 BBR Expanded Remaster ===
9. "Living in America" (12" R&B Dance Version)
10. "Gravity" (12" Extended Dance Mix)
11. "How Do You Stop" (12" Special Extended Mix)
12. "Goliath" (12" Message House Mix)
13. "Living in America" (Rocky IV Soundtrack Album Version)
14. "Gravity" (Single Version)
15. "Living in America" (Instrumental)

== Personnel ==
- James Brown - all main vocals, organ solo on track 8
- Steve Winwood - synthesizers (listed in liner notes as "lead & backing synthesizer") on track 3
- Dan Hartman - guitars, keyboards, programming, backing vocals, Fairlight programming (listed as "Eddie Fairlight III"), all instruments except drums & horns on track 7 "Repeat the Beat (Faith)"
- Stevie Ray Vaughan - guitars on track 5
- T. M. Stevens - bass (on all tracks except 7), backing vocals
- Ray Marchica, Art Wood, George Recile - drums, percussion
- Trazi Williams - congas
- The Uptown Horns (Arno Hecht, Bob Funk, Crispin Cioe, "Hollywood" Paul Litteral) - all brass instruments
- Maceo Parker - alto saxophone
- Alison Moyet - ad-libs/vocal trade-offs, backing vocals
- Charlie Midnight, Gail Boggs - backing vocals

Technical

- Chris Lord-Alge - mixing
- Bonnie Schiffman - cover photography
