= The Mafu Cage =

1978 gothic thriller film

- Theatrical release poster
- Directed by: Karen Arthur
- Written by: Don Chastain
- Based on: Toi et Les Nuages by Eric Westphal
- Produced by: Diana Young; Karen Arthur; Gary L. Triano
- Starring: Carol Kane; Lee Grant; Will Geer; James Olson; Budar
- Cinematography: John Bailey
- Edited by: Carol Littleton
- Distributed by: The Jerry Gross Organization
- Release date: December 1, 1978
- Running time: 104 minutes
- Budget: $1 million

The Mafu Cage (also released as My Sister, My Love, Deviation and Don't Ring the Doorbell) is a 1978 American psychological horror film directed by Karen Arthur, and starring Carol Kane and Lee Grant. Its plot follows two sisters Ellen and Cissy, both the daughters of a late anthropologist Max Carpenter, residing in a dilapidated Los Angeles mansion: Ellen, is an astronomer, and Cissy, is a dysfunctional eccentric who keeps and tortures a variety of monkeys and other primates.

Arthur worked with screenwriter Don Chastain to loosely adapt Eric Westphal's play Toi et Tes Nuages, which she had seen in Paris in 1975. The film premiered at the 1978 Cannes Film Festival.

== Plot ==
Ellen Carpenter is a successful but emotionally repressed astronomer in Los Angeles who resides with her sister, Cissy in a dilapidated house in the Hollywood Hills; the sisters inherited the home from their late father Max, a successful anthropologist who worked extensively in Africa. Cissy is mentally imbalanced, childlike, and unable to carry on a functional life on her own, spending most of her time caring for her pet monkeys—which she refers to as "mafus"—which she keeps in a large cage in the living room. None of the animals last long in Cissy's possession, however, due to her violent outbursts, during which she kills them.

Cissy is angered when Ellen refuses to acquire another mafu for her, but continues her incestuous fixation on Ellen nontheless. Cissy threatens suicide if Ellen will not purchase her a king colobus monkey, to which Ellen acquiesces. When their godfather, Zom, a zoologist, is unable to provide a colobus, he instead brings an orangutan, which enthralls Cissy. Meanwhile, Ellen is romanced by David Eastman, a coworker at the Griffith Observatory, but she is hesitant to allow him into her private life due to her and her sister's unusual circumstances. After Cissy learns of David, she spirals into a psychological breakdown, vying for sister's attention, and brutally beats her new orangutan to death with a chain.

Ellen subsequently takes a work trip to Arizona, leaving Cissy alone for several days. One day, David arrives at the house hoping to find Ellen, but is met by Cissy instead. She invites him inside, showing him the various African artifacts collected by her father. Cissy explains to David how their father built the mafu cage inside the home so he could continue his work at home while still being with his daughters. Cissy and David have drinks together and dance to tribal music in the house, eventually ending up in the mafu cage. Cissy chains David to shackles on the wall, which he assumes is a joke, but she proceeds to lock him inside.

Cissy proceeds to study David as an anthropological subject. Later that night, she paints her face red and dresses in tribal regalia to enact rituals studied by her father amongst African tribes; using an ornate wooden club, Cissy bludgeons David to death, and subsequently buries his corpse in the garden. Ellen returns home and notices a portrait Cissy made of a man that resembles David, which disturbs her. Her worries that Cissy might have harmed David are substantiated when she finds blood-soaked clothing in the laundry hamper. Realizing Cissy murdered David, Ellen locks herself in the bathroom while Cissy has a violent nervous breakdown.

Hours later, Ellen emerges from the bathroom only to be trapped by Cissy, who subsequently shackles Ellen in the mafu cage. A defeated Ellen refuses to eat, defying Cissy, and threatens that Cissy will be locked in an institution once authorities find Ellen's body. Cissy sketches an ornate mural on the walls of the mafu cage as Ellen grows progressively weak. Ellen eventually dies, leaving Cissy distraught. After placing Ellen in a burial garb, Cissy padlocks herself inside the mafu cage, and shackles herself to the wall.

== Cast ==
- Lee Grant as Ellen Carpenter
- Carol Kane as Cissy Carpenter
- Will Geer as Zom
- James Olson as David Eastman
- Budar as Mafu

== Production ==
After making a name for herself with her $70,000 debut, Legacy, Karen Arthur worked with an investor to scrape together $1 million to independently finance The Mafu Cage. The film was shot over the course of five weeks (beginning in August 1977) on location in a mansion in Los Angeles' Los Feliz neighborhood beneath the Griffith Observatory. Arthur—who spent some time in a mental hospital as part of the research process—was able to shoot in the mansion rent-free, and she says she also managed to convince art galleries and museums to loan her artifacts for the film's sets.

== Release ==
After premiering at the 1978 Cannes Film Festival's Directors' Fortnight, the film was distributed widely in Europe, but had a harder time in North America. Arthur ended up selling the film to distributor Jerry Gross, who changed the name to Don't Ring the Doorbell, and then My Sister, My Love, trying to sell it as an exploitation film, a move that was unsuccessful, and, in tandem with other underperforming releases, ultimately bankrupted him.

=== Critical response ===
Cecilia Blanchfield of the Montreal Gazette wrote that the film "creeps up on you little by little" and described it as a thriller of a "rare and disturbing intensity."

=== Home media ===
The film went on to attain cult status, initially released on VHS as My Sister, My Love by Charles Band's Wizard Video, and later as The Cage by Bill Lustig's Magnum Video. It was unavailable on DVD for many years at the dawn of that format. In 2010, Scorpion Releasing finally released it on DVD. A Blu-ray edition was issued by Scorpion Releasing in 2019.

== Sources ==
- Heller-Nicholas, Alexandra (2020). "Inside Karen Arthur's The Mafu Cage". In Peirse, Alison (ed.). Women Make Horror: Filmmaking, Feminism, Genre. Rutgers, New Jersey: Rutgers University Press. pp. 33–46. ISBN 978-1-978-80512-5.
