= Skin 'Em Up =

Studio album by the Shakin' Pyramids
- Released: 27 March 1981
- Recorded: January 1981
- Genre: Rockabilly
- Label: Cuba Libre (Virgin)
- Producer: Ali Mackenzie

The Shakin' Pyramids chronology
Skin 'Em Up (1981)	Celts and Cobras (1982)

Skin 'Em Up is the debut album from the Scottish neo-rockabilly group the Shakin' Pyramids, released in 1981 by Cuba Libre, a subsidiary of Virgin Records. It reached no. 48 on the UK Albums Chart, and yielded a single in "Tennessee Rock 'n' Roll". The band released three EPs during 1981, two of which were led by tracks from the album: Take a Trip and Tennessee Rock 'n' Roll (the latter backed by single B-side "Alright Alnight" and two new tracks). The album has been described as an important release in the early 1980s rockabilly revival.

Skin 'Em Up was recorded in only 50 hours. Producer Ali Mackenzie stated, "The Pyramids had more of an acoustic sound so we could knock the songs out pretty quickly. It was done dirt-cheap."

== Reception ==
Professional ratings
Review scores
Source	Rating
AllMusic	4.5/5 stars
The Rolling Stone Album Guide	5/5 stars

Melody Maker wrote, "As a debut album, Skin 'Em Up is confident, fast and fun." NME noted, "Although The Shakin' Pyramids don't twist the '50's forms into any startling directions, they do invest them with a great deal of spontaneity and freshness." Sounds stated, "With a deep-rooted love for the Everlys, the hardy ability to busk their way around the nation's bus stops and the confidence to rely on the minimum of instrumental muscle, they are different from the rest, in a perverse way."

Skin 'Em Up was awarded 5/5 stars in The Rolling Stone Album Guide (1983). Trouser Press wrote, "The album pounds furiously, putting your average megawatt metal band to shame. Songs — mostly non-originals — zip by at a blinding rate; the record's only flaw is its brief running time. Then again, if brevity be the soul of this music, the Shakin' Pyramids are a rockabilly Ramones." AllMusic rated the album 4½/5 stars, calling it an "explosive bopping and mostly acoustic set" that "helped define the short-lived rockabilly revival of the early '80s".

== Track listing ==
Side A

No.	Title	Length
1.	"Take A Trip"	2:21
2.	"Tennessee Rock 'n' Roll"	2:27
3.	"Let's Go"	1:44
4.	"Teenage Boogie"	1:27
5.	"Tired 'n' Sleepy (live)"	2:24
6.	"Wild Little Willie"	1:29

Side B

No.	Title	Length
1.	"Cry Cry Kitten"	2:38
2.	"Sixteen Chicks"	1:48
3.	"Pretty Bad Blues"	1:52
4.	"I Got A Baby (live)"	2:28
5.	"Sunset Of My Tears"	3:28
6.	"Hellbent On Rockin'"	2:06

== Personnel ==
- The Shakin' Pyramids
  - Davie Duncan – lead vocals, harp, percussion
  - James G. Creighton – guitar, background vocals
  - "Railroad" Ken McLellan – guitar, background vocals
- Additional
  - Nick Clark – bass guitar
  - Brian Young – Engineer
