= Ben Scotti =

American football player (1937–2025)

No. 48, 28
- Position: Defensive back

Personal information
- Born: June 9, 1937; Newark, New Jersey, U.S.
- Died: March 13, 2025 (aged 87)
- Listed height: 6 ft 1 in (1.85 m)
- Listed weight: 185 lb (84 kg)

Career information
- High school: St. Benedict's (Newark)
- College: Maryland
- NFL draft: 1959: undrafted

Career history
- Washington Redskins (1959–1961); Philadelphia Eagles (1962–1963); San Francisco 49ers (1964)

Awards and highlights
- First-team All-ACC (1958)

Career NFL statistics
- Interceptions: 10
- Fumble recoveries: 2
- Sacks: 1
- Stats at Pro Football Reference

Benjamin Joseph Scotti (June 9, 1937 – March 13, 2025) was an American producer and football defensive back in the National Football League (NFL). A graduate of the University of Maryland (1959), Scotti played for the Washington Redskins (1959–1961), the Philadelphia Eagles (1962–1963), and the San Francisco 49ers (1964). In late November 1963, Scotti received brief national attention when he precipitated a fight with teammate John Mellekas that sent Mellekas to the hospital. He is the brother of media mogul Tony Scotti, with whom he co-produced a few television programs, most notably the lifeguard drama Baywatch, and also co-founded the Scotti Bros. record label which released music by artists such as Leif Garrett, Survivor and "Weird Al" Yankovic until the label was dissolved in the mid-1990s. He went on to form Banders. Scotti was portrayed by Will Forte in the 2022 film Weird: The Al Yankovic Story; the film is a satirical biopic loosely based on Yankovic's own life in which "Weird Al" is portrayed by Daniel Radcliffe.

Scotti died on March 13, 2025, at the age of 87.
