= Scotti Brothers Records =

US record label

- Parent company: All American Television (1981–1997); Catalog: Zomba Group (1998–2003); BMG (2003–2004); Sony BMG (2004–2008); Sony Music (2008–present)
- Founded: 1974; 52 years ago
- Founder: Tony Scotti, Ben Scotti
- Defunct: 1997; 29 years ago
- Status: Defunct
- Distributors: Atlantic (1974-1982); CBS/Epic (1982-Jan 1990); BMG (1990-1995); WEA (1995-1997); Legacy Recordings/Volcano Entertainment (re-releases)
- Genre: Various
- Country of origin: United States

Scotti Brothers Records (typically spelled Scotti Bros. Records) was a California-based record label founded by Tony and Ben Scotti in 1974. Their first success was releasing singles and albums from teen pop star Leif Garrett. They later helped launch the careers of Tony Paul, Felony, Survivor, and "Weird Al" Yankovic (the latter under their Rock 'n' Roll banner). They also signed James Brown to a recording contract in the mid-1980s as well as the UK act Flag featuring David Cairns from Secret Affair and Archie Brown. Tommy Puett released his only album Life Goes On in 1990 under Scotti Brothers Records.

The label, as well as the Scotti brothers themselves, ran an independent motion picture production company Scotti Bros. Pictures, and was associated with the television syndication company All American Television (which later became part of All American Communications after becoming involved in the production and distribution of Baywatch; some Scotti Bros. recording artists made occasional guest spots on the show such as Tony Paul (California Dreams) since the company's inception. In 1996, Scotti Brothers Records was renamed All American Music Group, but the Scotti Brothers name was retained as a label of All American, along with sister labels Street Life and Backyard.

After Pearson PLC purchased All American in 1997, the Scotti Brothers contracts, masters, and catalogs were sold to Zomba Records subsidiary Volcano Entertainment, which was later bought by Sony Music Entertainment. All Scotti Bros. artists were dropped, with the exception of Yankovic and Survivor, who were switched to Volcano.

The Scotti Brothers Records catalog is now wholly owned by Volcano Entertainment.

== See also ==
- Scotti Brothers Records discography
