= Jimmy Davis & Junction =

American hard rock/Southern rock band

Jimmy Davis & Junction were a short-lived American hard rock/Southern rock band based out of Memphis, Tennessee. Fronted by local singer/guitarist Jimmy Davis, the band was active from the mid- to late-1980s, scoring a minor hit on the Billboard Hot 100 in 1987 with "Kick the Wall," which also cracked the Top 40 on the Mainstream Rock chart.

== History ==
Hailing from Memphis, Tennessee, the principal members of Jimmy Davis & Junction at the beginning of their recording career were Jimmy Davis (lead vocals, guitar), Tommy Burroughs (vocals, guitar, mandolin, violin ), John Scott (keyboards), and Chuck Reynolds (drums). This lineup recorded their debut album Kick the Wall in the mid-1980s without a permanent bassist, releasing the record on MCA in 1987. The album was produced by fellow Memphian and local legend Jack Holder, who also provided most bass parts, additional guitar, and additional keyboards on the record. Characterized by a brash hard rock sound mixed with elements of blues rock/boogie rock and Southern rock, the album gained national exposure thanks to its title track, a song about dealing with the frustrations of an unsuccessful relationship. The group recorded a music video for the song and appeared on several MTV music specials. Earning an immediate local following, the group began touring across the U.S. "Kick the Wall" would eventually peak at #67 on the pop charts and reached number 32 on the Mainstream Rock chart. A music video was also produced for the lead-off track on the album, "Catch My Heart."

Bassist David Cochran, who had performed on one track on the Kick the Wall album, soon joined the band as an official member. They recorded a new track, "My Way or the Highway" for the soundtrack to A Nightmare on Elm Street 4: The Dream Master, released in 1988. However, a full-length follow-up album from the band would not be forthcoming.

== Post-breakup ==
Following the dissolution of the group, Davis continued performing live in smaller clubs into the 1990s, also contributing to the debut solo album from fellow Memphian and Survivor's then-frontman Jimi Jamison. In 1996, Davis again teamed with Burroughs to reform The Riverbluff Clan, which had been a prominent rock/country/bluegrass band in the 1970s. The revamped band released two albums, including the live recording, One Night in a Month of Sundays and a studio album, Two Quarts Low, with both receiving critical acclaim/recognition.

== Recent reunions ==
On November 30, 2014, all five members of Jimmy Davis & Junction (including David Cochran) reunited to perform at a benefit concert at Neil's Music Room in Memphis for their former producer, Jack Holder, who was suffering from medical problems. Holder died on January 14, 2015, of complications from cancer at the age of 62.

== Follow-up album ==
In May 2017, 30 years after the band released their debut album, the band's follow-up album, Going the Distance, was released.

== Discography ==
=== Studio albums ===
- Kick the Wall (1987)
- Going the Distance (2017)

=== Singles ===
- "Kick the Wall" (1987)
- "Catch My Heart" (1987)

=== Miscellaneous ===
- "My Way or the Highway" (featured on the A Nightmare on Elm Street 4 soundtrack) (1988)
