= Cry Alone =

Cry Alone may refer to:

- "Cry Alone", song by Survivor's Jimi Jamison from When Love Comes Down
- "Cry Alone", song by Bill Frisell from Big Sur (album) 2013
- "Cry Alone", song by Lil Peep from Come Over When You're Sober, Pt. 2
