= Empires (Jimi Jamison album) =

Studio album by Jimi Jamison
- Released: October 17, 1999 (re-released in 2003)
- Venue: Bossa Nova Hotel Studios, San Fernando, California
- Studio: Blue Danube Studio, Hollywood, California
- Genre: Hard rock
- Length: 68:03
- Label: USG Records Germany
- Producer: Klay Shroedel

Jimi Jamison chronology
When Love Comes Down (1991)	Empires (1999)	Crossroads Moment (2008)

Singles from Empires
- 1. "I'm Always Here" Released: 1996 (originally from 1993); 2. "Have Mercy" Released: 1996; 3. "A Dream too Far" Released: 1999; 4. "Keep it Evergreen" Released: 1999

Empires is the second solo album from American rock singer-songwriter Jimi Jamison, released under the name Jimi Jamison's Survivor on October 17, 1999 for Scotti Brothers, was distributed in Germany by Soulfood Music and produced by Klay Shroedel.

In 2003, after a battle in court over access to the name Survivor, this album would be re-released under his own name for Frontiers Records. The album highlight is the Baywatch hit theme song; as bonus tracks, it includes three live versions of previous Survivor songs ("Burning Heart", "Rebel Son" and "Too Hot to Sleep") plus the Christmas song "Keep It Evergreen" and a cover of the 1976 hit song "Love Is Alive" by Gary Wright.

== Track listing ==
No.	Title	Writer(s)	Length
1.	"Cry Tough"	Carl Curtis	3:58
2.	"Run from the Thunder"	Kenny Mims	4:25
3.	"I'm Always Here"	Jimi Jamison, Cory Lerios & John d'Andrea	4:03
4.	"Empires"	Jimi Jamison, Jim Peterik & Frankie Sullivan	6:40
5.	"First Day of Love"	Mike Lawler & Kenny Mims	3:55
6.	"Have Mercy"	Jimi Jamison, Kenny Mims & Kevin Stewart	4:23
7.	"Just Beyond the Clouds"	Kenny Mims	5:13
8.	"A Dream Too Far"	Kenny Mims	4:16
9.	"Love Is Alive"	Kent Robbins	4:16
10.	"November Rain"	Jimi Jamison & Kenny Mims	3:42
11.	"Calling America"		4:11

Bonus tracks
No.	Title	Writer(s)	Length
12.	"Keep It Evergreen"	Bobby Hart & Jimi Jamison	4:19
13.	"Too Hot to Sleep (live)"	Jimi Jamison, Jim Peterik & Frankie Sullivan	5:29
14.	"Burning Heart (live)"	Jim Peterik & Frankie Sullivan	4:20
15.	"Rebel Son (live)"	Jimi Jamison, Jim Peterik & Frankie Sullivan	4:57
Total length:			68:03

== Personnel ==
- Jimi Jamison – lead vocals
- Hal Butler – keyboards, backing vocals
- Chris Adamson – guitars, backing vocals
- Klay Shroedel – drums (1–11), additional keyboards (3, 10), arrangements, horn and string arrangements (4, 6, 7, 10)

Additional musicians

- Rudy Richardson – acoustic piano, keyboards, horns, strings
- Michael Sembello – additional keyboards (3, 10), arrangements
- Peter Roberts – additional acoustic guitar (3, 4), backing vocals, horn and string arrangements (4, 6, 7, 10)
- Jorgen Carlsson – bass
- Pete Mendillo – drums (12, 13)
- Lisa Frazier – backing vocals, co-lead vocals (4)
- Bobby Kimball – backing vocals

=== Production ===
- Stephan Bayerlein – executive producer
- Klay Shroedel – producer, recording, mixing
- Peter Roberts – co-producer, recording, mixing
- Uli Fried – mastering

== Facts ==
- Jamison co-wrote and sang "I'm Always Here", the theme of the 1990s hit TV series Baywatch in 1991 for all the seasons and episodes from September 23, 1991 - May 14, 2001 (except for the first season of the TV Series, it replaced "Save Me"). Jamison is credited as the lyricist on this song along with Joe Henry, who co-wrote the Rascal Flatts hit "Skin". The music is credited to Cory Lerios and John D'Andrea.
- It took 8 years for the second album released, this was because of Jamison being touring with the band (Jimi Jamison's Survivor) and for working in different projects with other musicians and artists.
- Jamison recorded many sessions and demos throughout the 1990s and part of those demos were material that ended up in this album.
- "Empires" was a survivor song from the album Too Hot To Sleep but didn't surface at the moment, this album version shows Lisa Frasier as the co-lead singer.
- The songs "Just Beyond The Clouds", "First Day of Love", "Empires", "Cry Tough" and "A Dream Too Far", were originally recorded between 1989 and 1995.
- All the demos and sessions Jimi did can be found as Jamo Sessions, Have Mercy: The Demos and The Mofo Sessions.
- The version of "I'm Always Here" is not the original one, this version has been made so it can be suit the album's style and year update.
- It is the last release by Scotti Bros. Records since it got defunct in 1997 and the catalogue was sold to Volcano Entertainment.
- The songs "Burning Heart" and "Rebel Son" are originally Survivor songs from their When Seconds Count album.
- The song "Too Hot to Sleep" is an originally Survivor song from their Too Hot to Sleep album.
