= Jimi Jamison =

American singer (1951–2014)

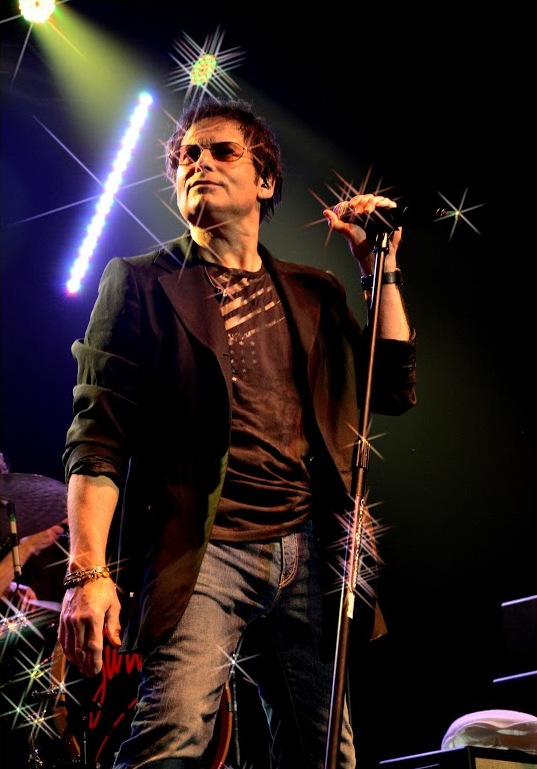
- Jamison performing at the Rainbow

Background information
- Also known as: Jimi Jamison, Jim Jamison, Jamo
- Born: Jimmy Wayne Jamison; August 23, 1951; Durant, Mississippi, U.S.
- Origin: Raleigh, Memphis, Tennessee, U.S.
- Died: September 1, 2014 (aged 63) Memphis, Tennessee, U.S.
- Genres: Rock; hard rock; heavy metal; country
- Occupations: Singer; songwriter
- Years active: 1967–2014
- Labels: Scotti Bros.; Frontiers; Epic; A&M; ATCO

Jimmy Wayne Jamison (August 23, 1951 – September 1, 2014) was an American singer. Best known as Jimi Jamison, he earned recognition as the frontman for the rock bands Target, Cobra, and Survivor from 1984 to 1988, performing the songs "Burning Heart" from the film Rocky IV (1985) and "The Moment of Truth" from The Karate Kid (1984), along with other top-20 Survivor hits "I Can't Hold Back", "High On You", "The Search Is Over", and "Is This Love". He officially rejoined Survivor from 2000, until 2006, and rejoined again in 2011. Acclaimed for his vocal abilities, Jamison is also known for having co-written and performed the theme song "I'm Always Here" for the 1990s TV series Baywatch.

== Early life ==
Jimmy Wayne Jamison was born in rural Durant, Mississippi, but liked to think of himself as a Memphis, Tennessee, native, as he and his mother Dorothy moved there when he was one day old. In his teens, growing up in blues-rock and soul music, he taught himself how to play the guitar and piano. The first song Jimi ever performed in front of a crowd was "Day Tripper" by The Beatles, while he was in middle school (Sherwood) in the mid-1960s.

== Career ==
=== Early career ===
Jimi began playing in an R&B band called The Debuts. It was to be Jamison's first taste of success, and he was only 12 years old at the time. While students at Messick High School, the band had a hit with their first single, the Wayne Carson-penned "If I Cry" in 1968. It was a song originally intended for fellow Memphis band The Box Tops, but the group discarded the tune before recording it; Box Tops frontman Alex Chilton gave it to The Debuts instead. The band was picked up and signed by Atlantic Records. Soon the teenagers hit the road with the likes of Roy Orbison and Mitch Ryder & the Detroit Wheels, also touring with The Buckinghams. The band broke up in 1969, but Jimi and Rowell continued playing together years later before going their separate ways. Meanwhile, Jamison became part of a self-contained group of musicians (including Tommy Cathey) recording with local keyboardist David Beaver; Jamison features prominently as lead vocalist on the 1973 album, Combinations (credited to D. Beaver).

=== Target (1974–1980) ===
After the second session's recording with David Beaver, both Jamison and Cathey teamed up with guitarist Buddy Davis and formed the Memphis southern rock band Target in the mid 1970s. The band started and became a local arena band playing live constantly building up their reputation. Having success, the band released the albums Target (1976) and Captured (1977) on A&M Records with the singles "Are you Ready", "Let Me Live" and "It is Only Love", opening concerts for Black Sabbath, Boston, and Kiss.

=== Cobra (1981–1983) ===
In 1982, Jamison joined guitarist Mandy Meyer (ex-Krokus), guitarist/keyboardist Jack Holder (ex-Black Oak Arkansas), bassist Tommy Keiser, and drummer Jeff Klaven in the band Cobra, managed by Butch Stone (who also managed Target as well as Krokus and Black Oak Arkansas), replacing original vocalist Tommy Andris. The band became a hit in the Memphis scene and signed with Epic Records. The group released one album, the Tom Allom-produced First Strike, in 1983. The British music magazine Kerrang! listed the album at number one in its import charts with the song "Blood On Your Money" getting MTV airplay, being Jamison's first music video.

"Looking at You" and "Travelin' Man" were promoted at the Memphis TV Club. Cobra started touring in the United States opening for Quiet Riot, Nazareth, and Krokus. Their live performance on November 27, 1983, was broadcast on the King Biscuit Flower Hour (KBFH) and later partly released on the Live Attack! and Only You Can Rock Me bootlegs. The live set included a half dozen unreleased songs, including their original "I'm a Fighter", written by Jimi and Mandy, which was covered by the group Van Zant in the mid-1980s. Meanwhile, First Strike was only a moderate commercial success, and the band split at the end of the year, primarily due to each member wanting to do different things.

=== Survivor (1984–1988) ===
After Cobra's demise in 1984, Jamison was invited to join Survivor (after his friend, Frank Rand, from Epic Records had suggested him to them), whose success had been waning since their number-one hit "Eye of the Tiger" in 1982. The band had recently parted ways with original singer Dave Bickler, due to his vocal cord injuries that required a lengthy convalescence. After a successful audition with the band, Jamison joined them despite some misgivings about Survivor's pop rock sound. He provided a spark to the band, eventually gaining great success and putting the band back on top. His first recording with the band was "The Moment of Truth" (The Karate Kid theme song), which reached number 63 on the Billboard Hot 100 in July 1984.

Jamison's first full album with Survivor, and the band's fifth overall, was Vital Signs, released later in 1984. That album reached number 16 on the Billboard Album Chart and was certified platinum by the RIAA. The album included the hit singles "High on You" (which reached number 8 on the Billboard Hot 100 singles chart), "I Can't Hold Back" (number 13 on the singles chart and number 1 on Top Rock Tracks chart), with Jamison proving to be a worthy frontman and a photogenic face of the band, which helped the video for this song get significant airplay on MTV, and "The Search Is Over" (number 4 on the singles chart and number 1 on the adult contemporary chart). "First Night" also reached number 53 on the singles chart.

The band began touring in Chicago and Indianapolis in 1984, in 1985 the band went on tour with headliner Bryan Adams, performing at his sold-out concerts at Nashville's War Memorial Auditorium, the Dallas Convention Center, the San Antonio Convention Center and the Lakefront Arena in New Orleans. They also toured with REO Speedwagon around that time with appearances at the San Diego Sports Arena and other venues, plus touring in Tokyo, Japan in which they released a DVD of the concert and appeared and performed in different Japanese Television Shows. That same year Survivor was requested by Stallone once again to do the theme song for the next Rocky film, achieving another hit with "Burning Heart" from the film Rocky IV. In early 1986, the single peaked at number 2 on the Billboard Hot 100.

Jamison's second album with Survivor, When Seconds Count, was released on October 9, 1986, and included the hit single "Is This Love" (number 7 on the singles chart). The album peaked at a disappointing number 49 on the Billboard Album Chart but still managed to sell over 500,000 copies and was certified Gold. This album also featured Jamison making songwriting contributions to the band's repertoire, including the single "Man Against the World" (number 86). This song was originally slated for inclusion on the Rocky IV soundtrack and was in fact later included in that album's 2006 reissue. Another single, "How Much Love" peaked at number 51 on the singles chart, while "In Good Faith" was promoted in Europe, with the band performing on German TV shows.

Survivor released their final 80s album, Too Hot to Sleep, in late 1988. Jamison would later cite the album as his personal favorite with Survivor, but it suffered from a lack of record company promotion and only reached number 187 on the Billboard albums chart. Three singles were released, with "Across the Miles" reaching number 74 on the singles chart, "Didn't Know It Was Love" reaching number 61, and "Desperate Dreams" receiving promotion in Europe, but the band could not sustain the success from their previous albums.

=== Solo career (1989–1999) ===
In 1989, Jamison contributed his own version of "Ever Since the World Began", a song Survivor had initially recorded before his tenure in the band, to Sylvester Stallone's film, Lock Up, after being requested by Stallone. That same year, he was invited to join Deep Purple, who had just fired longtime singer Ian Gillan. After a two-week session with the band, he reluctantly parted ways with them; according to Deep Purple organist Jon Lord, "He [Jamison] was an enormous Deep Purple fan and he would happily have taken over the job. But at the time he was afraid of his managers. They didn't want him to leave [Survivor] and he didn't dare to get into a fight with them." Jamison's managers wanted him to concentrate on his upcoming solo album instead of joining Deep Purple. Also in 1989, Jamison briefly united with his Target bandmates for a "10-Year Reunion" concert in Memphis and was part of the New Year's Eve celebration in the Crown Plaza. It was also around this time that Jamison performed the entrance song "Hard Times" for the wrestler Big Boss Man when he was in the WWF.

Jamison's first solo album When Love Comes Down was released in July 1991. While neither the album nor any of its singles made much impact on the charts, the songs "Rock Hard" and "Taste of Love" were used in episodes of Baywatch, and the latter was also used in the 1992 film Jersey Girl. Jamison's association with Baywatch began that same year, when CBS enlisted him to create a song for the then-just-acquired TV Series; Jimi would co-write (with Cory Lerios and John D'Andrea) and perform "I'm Always Here," the series's theme song. The song achieved success and pop culture recognition, with various versions of the song appearing as the show's opening theme until 2001.

Jamison began touring under the name Survivor or Jimi Jamison's Survivor with a new solo band consisting of Hal Butler (keyboards, vocals), Jeff Adams (bass, vocals), Bill Marshall (drums), and initially official Survivor member Frankie Sullivan on guitar, though he was soon replaced by Jeff Miller. Sullivan and Jim Peterik from the "official" Survivor then filed a lawsuit against their one-time bandmate for continuing to bill his group as "Survivor", but were unsuccessful in preventing Jamison from touring under the band's name until 1999. During this period, the Scotti Brothers label released two Survivor compilation albums featuring songs from Jamison's tenure.

The solo album Empires, featuring a re-recorded version of "I'm Always Here" and a cover of "Love is Alive" by Gary Wright, was released under the name Jimi Jamison's Survivor in October 1999.

=== Second tenure with Survivor (2000–2006) ===
Jamison reunited with Survivor in March 2000, replacing original singer Dave Bickler once again. In 2002, the band released "Christmas is Here", which reached No. 6 on the Mediabase Christmas charts. In 2005, Jamison and the band were part of a Starbucks commercial, making an Eye of the Tiger parody, which gave them an Emmy Nomination. Jamison and the band released the album Reach in April 2006. The album was Survivor's first new album in 18 years. Jamison quit the band shortly after the release of Reach, on July 14.

=== Return to solo work (2007–2014) ===
Jamison released the solo album Crossroads Moment in Europe in July 2008 and in America the following year. The album was produced by his former Survivor bandmate Jim Peterik. He continued touring in Rio, Brazil, Chile and Barcelona, Spain. A companion album of outtakes called Extra Moments was released in 2010, the additional tracks had been compiled by Jamison and Peterik as a benefit for the music website melodicrock.com.

In 2011, Jamison teamed up with Toto singer Bobby Kimball for the album Kimball Jamison. The two singers shared lead vocals on songs written by Richard Page (Mr Mister), Randy Goodrum (Toto, Steve Perry), John Waite, and other notable rock songwriters.

During this period Jamison also formed the band One Man's Trash with Fred Zahl. That group released the album History in December 2011 for Starhouse Records. The band earned an endorsement from the guitar company Hofner.

=== Final tenure with Survivor (2011–2014) ===
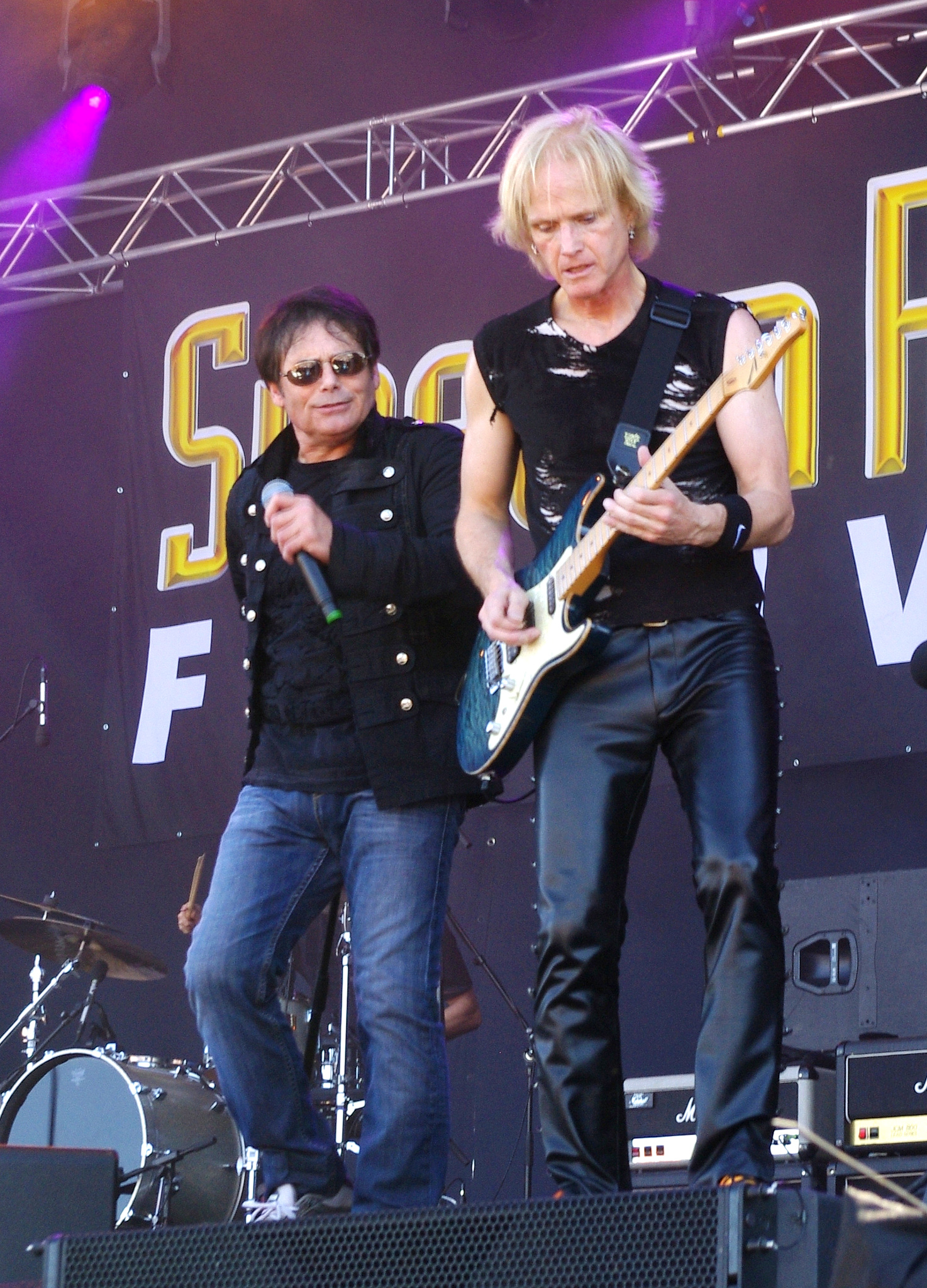
Jamison (left) with Survivor in 2013

Jamison again reunited with Survivor in 2011. In November of that year he performed Survivor's "Eye of the Tiger" (on which he did not sing originally) for boxer Manny Pacquiao's entrance into the ring for his bout against Shane Mosley at MGM Grand Las Vegas. Fueled by popular demand, Jamison would repeat the performance the following year for the boxer's next title defense.

In 2013, it was announced on the band's official media sources that Sullivan had reunited the current Survivor line-up with Bickler. They were also working on new material and looking forward to getting back into the studio together. Jamison participated in further tours with Survivor and would remain with the band until he died in 2014.

Jamison's last show was on August 30, 2014, in Morgan Hill, California, at the CANcert benefit event during the ARTTEC Summer Concert Series (arttecusa.com). The benefit raised funds and awareness for two non-profits supporting cancer patients as well as career training opportunities for high school students. Survivor's 58-minute set consisted of "Feels Like Love", "Broken Promises", "Take You on a Saturday", "High on You", "Rockin' into the Night", "The Search Is Over", "Rebel Girl", "I Can't Hold Back", "Burning Heart", "Poor Man's Son", "It's the Singer Not the Song" and ended with "Eye of the Tiger".

== Collaborations ==
Throughout his career, Jamison provided background vocals for several bands and artists such as DeGarmo & Key (This Ain't Hollywood, 1980, Heat it Up, 1993 and To Extremes, 1994); Gary Chapman (Sincerely Yours, 1981); Mylon LeFevre & Broken Heart (Brand New Start, 1982 and Sheep In Wolves Clothing, 1985); Krokus (Headhunter, 1983 and The Blitz, 1984); Molly Hatchet (The Deed is Done, 1984); and The Blackwood Brothers (All Their Best, 1984). He provided backing vocals throughout ZZ Top's 1983 album Eliminator and also for that band's contribution to the Back to the Future III soundtrack in 1990. Frontman Billy Gibbons referred to Jamison as the "fourth member" of the group after working, touring and hanging out with them on multiple occasions.

Jamison contributed vocals for Joe Walsh on the album Got any Gum? (1987), Ordinary Average Guy (1991), and Songs for a Dying Planet (1992). He was co-lead vocals with Walsh on the 1991 single "All of a Sudden", which reached number 13 on the Mainstream Rock Tracks chart. He also worked with the Fabulous Thunderbirds (Powerful Stuff, 1989), Ten Years After (About Time, 1989), Omar & the Howlers (Wall of Pride, 1988), Eric Gales Band (The Eric Gales Band, 1991 and Picture of a Thousand Faces, 1993), and Chris Bailey. (Demons, 1991),

Jamison provided backing vocals for long-time Heart guitarist Howard Leese's solo album Secret Weapon (2009). He released the single "House That Love Built" in early 2010 as a benefit for the Ronald McDonald House of Memphis. He also recorded the charity single "One Family" in 2011 with the all-star ensemble United Rockers 4 U, which also included Bobby Kimball, Don Dokken, Eddie Money, Jeff Paris, Paul Shortino, Phil Lewis, Richie Kotzen, and Robin McAuley. Jamison contributed backing vocals to the album Naked but Dressed by Dominoe in 2012. He contributed to an all-star tribute to Steve Miller Band in 2013. One of his last vocal performances was the song "Summer Rains" on guitarist Tommy Denander's 2015 release F4ur by the band Radioactive.

== Style and legacy ==
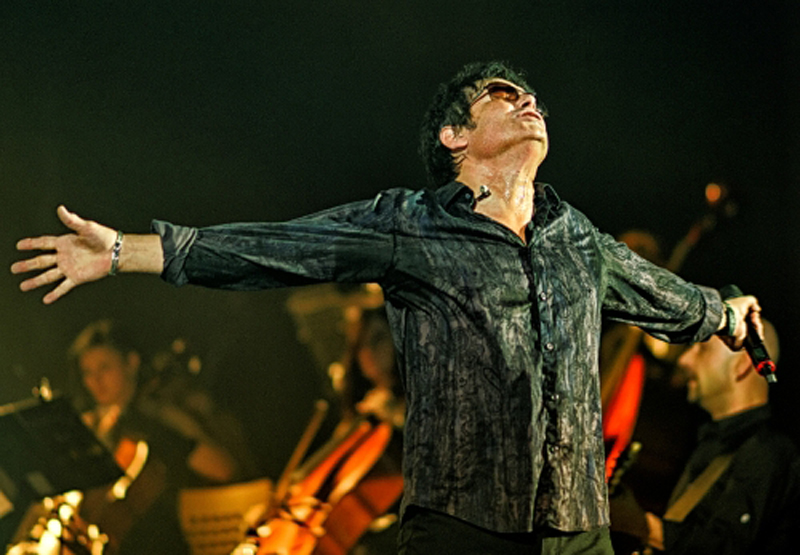
Jamison performing in 2012

Jamison earned acclaim for his vocal abilities. "We didn't even consider it [pitch editing] on him," sound engineer Terry Manning says. "We didn't even have it back then. He never needed it. He could hold pitch. He could sing vibrato when needed. He could sing straight when needed. He could do whatever you needed. Casey Kasem, the big DJ guy, called him 'The Voice.' That's what he named him. He just was the voice." Jamison is an Honorary Member of the Louisiana Music Hall of Fame. Rolling Stone magazine called Jamison "a true Rock and Roll Legend."

== Personal life and death ==
In 1972, Jamison married Brenda Fay Mason, who is the mother of his first child. They divorced in 1983 and Jamison later married Deborah Cathey in 1985. With Cathey, he had two more children. Jamison and Cathey separated in 1999. When not traveling or performing, Jamison enjoyed time with his longtime love Pattie Sullivan, gardening, throwing horseshoes, various sports such as tennis and golf, and spending time with his family.

Jamison died on September 1, 2014, at his home in Raleigh, Memphis, Tennessee, aged 63. While he was initially thought to have died of a heart attack, his autopsy revealed he had cardiovascular disease and narrowing of the arteries and that he died of a hemorrhagic brain stroke, with "acute methamphetamine intoxication contributing". His death was ruled accidental.

== Discography ==
=== With Survivor ===
| Album | Year | Label | US Billboard 200 | Swiss | Germany | Sweden | Certification RIAA | Canada Certification |
|---|---|---|---|---|---|---|---|---|
| Vital Signs | 1984 | Scotti Bro. & Volcano | 16 | 27 | – | 48 | Platinum | Gold |
| When Seconds Count | 1986 | Scotti Brothers | 49 | – | – | 30 | Gold | – |
| Too Hot to Sleep | 1988 | Scotti Brothers | 187 | 23 | 55 | 48 | – | – |
| Reach | 2006 | Frontiers Records | – | – | – | – | – | – |

=== Solo ===
| Album | Year | Label | With | Europe Album of The Year |
|---|---|---|---|---|
| When Love Comes Down | 1991 | Scotti Bro. & Top Notch Records | – | – |
| Empires | 1999 | Scotti Bro. & Frontiers Records | Lisa Frazier (One Song) | – |
| Crossroads Moment | 2008 | Frontiers Records | Jim Peterik | 3 |
| Extra Moments | 2010 | MelodicRock Records | Jim Peterik | – |
| Kimball/Jamison | 2011 | Frontiers Records | Bobby Kimball | – |
| Never Too Late | 2012 | Frontiers Records | – | |
| Rock Hard | 2022 | Iconoclassic Records | – | –- |
| Jimmy Wayne Jamison | 2024 | Iconoclassic Records | – | – |

=== Other bands ===
| Album | Year | Label | Artist | Role | UK Import Charts |
|---|---|---|---|---|---|
| Combinations | 1973 | TMI | D Beaver | Lead & Backing Vocals | – |
| Target | 1976 | A&M Records | Target | Lead Vocals | – |
| Captured | 1977 | A&M Records | Target | Lead Vocals | – |
| First Strike | 1983 | Epic Records | Cobra | Lead Vocals | 1 |
| History | 2011 | Starhouse Records | One Man's Trash Feat. Jimi Jamison & Fred Zahl | Lead Vocals | – |

=== Collaborations ===
| Album | Year | Label | Artist | Role | With |
|---|---|---|---|---|---|
| This Ain't Hollywood | 1980 | – | Degarmo & Key | Backing Vocals | – |
| Eliminator | 1983 | Warner Bro. Records | ZZ Top | Backing Vocals | – |
| Headhunter | 1983 | Arista | Krokus | Backing Vocals | – |
| The Blitz | 1984 | Arista | Krokus | Backing Vocals | – |
| The Deed is Done | 1984 | Epic Records | Molly Hatchet | Backing Vocals | – |
| Got any Gum? | 1987 | Warner Bro. & Full Moon | Joe Walsh | Backing Vocals | – |
| Wall of Pride | 1988 | – | Omar & the Howlers | Backing Vocals | – |
| Memory in the Making | 1988 | Geffen records | John Kilzer | Backing Vocals | – |
| Powerful Stuff | 1989 | CBS | The Fabulous Thunderbirds | Backing Vocals | – |
| About Time | 1989 | Chrysalis | Ten Years After | Backing Vocals | – |
| Worrall | 1991 | Spy Records | Rick & Steve Worrall | Backing Vocals | Shawn Lane |
| Ordinary Average Guy | 1991 | Epic Records | Joe Walsh | Backing Vocals & Co-Lead (One Song) | – |
| The Eric Gales Band | 1991 | Elektra Records | Eric Gales | Backing Vocals | – |
| Songs for a Dying Planet | 1992 | Epic Records | Joe Walsh | Backing Vocals & Co-Lead (One Song) | – |
| Feel This | 1992 | Arista | Jeff Healey Band | Backing Vocals | – |
| Picture of a Thousand Faces | 1993 | Elektra Records | Eric Gales | Backing Vocals | – |
| Wake up Screaming | 1993 | Chrysalis | Every Mother's Nightmare | Backing Vocals | – |
| Hepfidelity | 1993 | – | Johnny Diesel | Backing Vocals | – |
| Heat it Up | 1993 | Benson Records | Degarmo & Key | Backing Vocals | – |
| To Extremes | 1994 | Benson Records | Degarmo & Key | Backing Vocals | – |
| Big Tent Revival | 1995 | – | Big Tent Revival | Backing Vocals | – |
| Funkology XIII | 2005 | TopNotch Records | Whitney Wolanin | Co-Lead Vocals (One Song) | – |
| Secret Weapon | 2009 | Frontiers Records | Howard Leese | Lead Vocals (One Song) | – |
| Matt Kennon | 2010 | BamaJam & Stroudavarious | Matt Kennon | Backing Vocals | – |
| Naked But Dressed | 2012 | Universal Music Group | Dominoe Feat. Jimi Jamison | Co-Lead Vocals (One Song) | – |
| Karmalion | 2013 | New Venture Music | Indicco Feat. Jimi Jamison | Backing and Co-Lead Vocals | – |
| Fly Like an Eagle: An All-Star Tribute to the Steve Miller Band | 2013 | – | Jimi Jamison & Jordan Rudess | Lead Vocals (One Song) | – |
| Light My Fire: A Classic Rock Salute to The Doors | 2014 | Purple Pyramid Records | Jimi Jamison | Lead Vocals (One Song) | – |
| F4ur | 2015 | Scape Music | Radioactive | Lead Vocals (One Song) | – |
| Red Blooded American Girl | 2015 | – | Gema Pearl Feat. Jimi Jamison | Co-Lead Vocals (One Song) | – |
| Matter of Passion | 2018 | Starhouse Records | Ally McMirror Feat. Jimi Jamison | Co-Lead Vocals | – |
| Battle Hymn of the Republic | 2018 | – | Various Artists | | – |
| Winds Of Change | 2019 | Frontiers Records | Jim Peterik Feat. Jimi Jamison | Lead Vocals | |

=== Issued/remastered ===
| Album | Year | Label | Artist | Role |
|---|---|---|---|---|
| The Mofo Sessions | 2009 (1993 recorded) | Time Wrap Records | Jimi Jamison & Steve Cox | Lead Vocals |
| Unreleased Music | 2012 (2007 recorded) | SongCast Music Distribution | Jimi Jamison | Lead Vocals |
| In Range | 2017 (1979 Recorded) | Escape Music | Target | Lead Vocals |

=== Compilation albums ===
| Album | Year | Label | Artist |
|---|---|---|---|
| Live in Indianapolis | 1984 | | Survivor |
| Live in Tokyo | 1985 | | Survivor |
| Live in Nagoya | 1986 | | Survivor |
| the best collection of survivor | 1986 | Scotti Brothers | Survivor |
| The Very Best Of Survivor | 1986 | Scotti Brothers | Survivor |
| Live in Osaka | 1987 | | Survivor |
| Live in Jackson, NY | 1987 | | Survivor |
| Live in Nelson, NJ | 1987 | | Survivor |
| Greatest Hits | 1989 | Volcano | Survivor |
| The Best Of Survivor | 1989 | Scotti Brothers | Survivor |
| New Years Eve in Memphis | 1989 | | Jimi Jamison |
| Greatest Hits The Video Collection | 1993 | Scotti Brothers | Survivor |
| Jimi Jamison's Survivor Collection 1 | 1993 | Scotti Brothers | Jimi Jamison's Survivor |
| Jimi Jamison's Survivor Collection 2 | 1994 | Scotti Brothers | Jimi Jamison's Survivor |
| American Television's Greatest Hits | 1995 | | Jimi Jamison |
| Live in Maine | 1996 | | Jimi Jamison's Survivor |
| Live in Houston | 1996 | | Jimi Jamison's Survivor |
| Live in Belgium | 1997 | | Jimi Jamison's Survivor |
| Prime Cuts: The Classic Tracks | 1998 | | Survivor |
| Jimi Jamison's Survivor I'm Always Here | 1999 | Scotti Brothers | Jimi Jamison's Survivor |
| Live in Las Vegas | 1999 | | Jimi Jamison |
| Survivor Special Selection | 2000 | | Survivor |
| Live at Hershey Park | 2000 | | Survivor |
| Gathering of tigers | 2000 | | Survivor |
| Millenium stage | 2000 | | Survivor |
| Uprising | 2000 | | Survivor |
| Live in Hachenburg | 2001 | | Survivor |
| Fire in Your Eyes: Greatest Hits | 2001 | | Survivor |
| Across the German miles | 2001 | | Survivor |
| The battle of Woodlands | 2001 | | Survivor |
| Volunteers for America | 2001 | | Survivor |
| Live in the Big Apple | 2002 | | Survivor |
| Turning back time | 2002 | | Survivor |
| Driven to Detroit | 2002 | | Survivor |
| Live in Mc Henry | 2003 | | Survivor |
| Ultimate Survivor | 2004 | | Survivor |
| Extended Versions: The Encore Collection | 2004 | | Survivor |
| Pearls of Survivor | 2005 | | Survivor |
| Take you on a Vegas Saturday | 2005 | | Survivor |
| Live in Kansas | 2006 | | Survivor |
| The Best Of Survivor | 2006 | Volcano | Survivor |
| Live at the Waukesha Country Fair | 2006 | | Survivor |
| Live in Orlando | 2006 | | Survivor |
| Live in Pewaukee | 2006 | | Survivor |
| The Eye of The Tiger in Rio | 2008 | | Jimi Jamison |
| Live in Brasil | 2008 | | Jimi Jamison |
| Voices of Rock Radio | 2008 | | Jimi Jamison |
| One Night in Weston | 2009 | Spectra Records | Jimi Jamison |
| Live in Barcelona | 2009 | | Jimi Jamison |
| Live in Santiago, Chile | 2009 | | Jimi Jamison |
| Playlist: The Very Best Of Survivor | 2009 | Volcano | Survivor |
| Best Of Survivor | 2009 | Sony Records | Survivor |
| Live at Firefest | 2010 | | Jimi Jamison |
| Super Hits | 2010 | Sony Records | Survivor |
| The Voice of The Tiger in Hamburg | 2011 | | Jimi Jamison |
| Unreleased Music | 2012 | SongCast Music Distribution | Jimi Jamison |
| The Definitive Collection | 2016 | | Survivor |

=== Singles/promos/EPs ===
| Title Song | Year | Album | Artist |
|---|---|---|---|
| "If I Cry" | 1968 | - | The Debuts |
| "It's Gonna Take Time" | 1973 | Combinations | D Beaver |
| "Are You Ready" | 1976 | Target | Target |
| "Let Me Live" | 1976 | Target | Target |
| "It's Only Love" | 1977 | Captured | Target |
| "Holdin' On" | 1977 | Captured | Target |
| "Shine the Light" | 1977 | Captured | Target |
| "Blood on Your Money" | 1983 | First Strike | Cobra |
| "Looking at You" | 1983 | First Strike | Cobra |
| "Travelin' Man" | 1983 | First Strike | Cobra |

| Title Song | Year | Album | Artist | US Mainstream Rock |
|---|---|---|---|---|
| "I'm a Fighter" | 1983, 1985 | Live Attack, Van Zant | Cobra, Van Zant | 16 |
Originally recorded by Cobra, written by Jamison and Meyer. Covered and used by Van Zant.

| Title Song | Year | Album | Artist | Billboard | Mainstream | Adult | Year-end 1985 | Australia | UK | Canada | Belgium |
|---|---|---|---|---|---|---|---|---|---|---|---|
| "The Moment of Truth" | 1984 | The Karate Kid Soundtrack, Vital Signs (by Rock Candy in 2009) | Survivor | 63 | – | – | – | – | – | – | – |
| "I Can't Hold Back" | 1984 | Vital Signs | Survivor | 13 | 1 | – | 73 | 93 | 80 | – | 18 |
| "High on You" | 1985 | Vital Signs | Survivor | 8 | 8 | – | – | – | – | – | – |
| "The Search Is Over" | 1985 | Vital Signs | Survivor | 4 | – | 1 | 48 | 60 | – | 21 | – |
| "First Night" | 1985 | Vital Signs | Survivor | 53 | – | – | – | – | – | – | – |

| Title Song | Year | Album | Artist |
|---|---|---|---|
| "Burning Heart" | 1985 | Rocky IV Soundtrack, When Seconds Count (by Rock Candy in 2009), Empires | Survivor, Jimi Jamison |
| Region | Chart Pos. 1985–86 | Year-End 1986 Region | Chart Pos. 1985–86 |
| Billboard 100 | 2 | Billboard 100 | 8 |
| Mainstream | 11 | Netherland | 12 |
| Singles Chart | 5 | Swiss | 15 |
| Singles Chart | 6 | France | 17 |
| Dutch Mega Top 100 | 2 | Dutch Top 40 | 17 |
| Europe Hot 100 | 1 | Belgium | 19 |
| SNEP singles chart | 2 | Germany | 30 |
| Germany Singles Chart | 6 | Italy | 47 |
| Ireland Singles Chart | 2 | Brazil Top 100 | 58 |
| South Africa | 27 | Certification | Sales |
| Swedish | 5 | France Gold | 1.000.000+ |
| Swiss | 1 | | |
| Canada | 14 | | |
| Ultratop 50 singles | 1 | | |
| Australia | 55 | | |
| Finland | 2 | | |
| Italy | 5 | | |
| Japanese | 46 | | |
| Japanese (International) | 1 | | |

| Title Song | Year | Album | Artist | Billboard | Mainstream | Adult Contemporary |
|---|---|---|---|---|---|---|
| "Is This Love" | 1986 | When Seconds Count | Survivor | 9 | 27 | 25 |
| "How Much Love" | 1987 | When Seconds Count | Survivor | 51 | – | – |
| "Man Against the World" | 1987 | When Seconds Count, Rocky IV Soundtrack | Survivor | 86 | – | – |
| "In Good Faith" | 1987 | When Seconds Count | Survivor | – | – | – |
| "Didn't Know It Was Love" | 1988 | To Hot to Sleep | Survivor | 61 | 40 | – |
| "Across the Miles" | 1989 | To Hot to Sleep | Survivor | 74 | | 16 |
| "Desperate Dreams" | 1989 | To Hot to Sleep | Survivor | – | – | – |
| "Ever Since the World Began" | 1989 | Lock Up Soundtrack | Jimi Jamison | – | – | – |
| "Cry Alone" | 1989 | Lock Up Soundtrack, When Love Comes Down | Jimi Jamison | – | – | – |
| "All of a Sudden" | 1991 | Ordinary Average Guy | Joe Walsh feat. Jimi Jamison | – | 13 | – |

| Title Song | Year | Album | Artist |
|---|---|---|---|
| "Taste of Love" | 1991 | When Love Comes Down, Baywatch, Jersey Girl Soundtrack | Jimi Jamison |
| "Rock Hard" | 1991 | When Love Comes Down, Baywatch | Jimi Jamison |
| "When Love Comes Down" | 1991 | When Love Comes Down | Jimi Jamison |
| "Look at Us Now" | 1992 | Songs for a Dying Planet | Joe Walsh feat. Jimi Jamison |

| Title Song | Year | Album | Artist | America's Greatest TV Hits 1995 | Germany Singles Chart 1999 |
|---|---|---|---|---|---|
| "I'll Be Ready" | 1993 | Baywatch Theme Song, Empires | Jimi Jamison | 3 | 95 |

| Title Song | Year | Album | Artist |
|---|---|---|---|
| "Have Mercy" | 1996 | Empires | Jimi Jamison |
| "A Dream Too Far" | 1999 | Empires | Jimi Jamison |
| "Keep It Evergreen" | 1999 | Empires | Jimi Jamison |
| "Velocitized" | 2001 | Live Recorded | Survivor |

| Title Song | Year | Album | Artist | Christmas Charts |
|---|---|---|---|---|
| "Christmas Is Here" | 2002 | A Classic Rock Christmas | Survivor | 6 |

| Title Song | Year | Album | Artist | Adult Contemporary | UK |
|---|---|---|---|---|---|
| "It Takes Two" | 2005 | Funkology XIII | Whitney Wolanin feat. Jimi Jamison | 9 | – |
| "Eye of the Tiger" (re-entry) | 2005 | – | Survivor | – | 47 |

| Title Song | Year | Album | Artist |
|---|---|---|---|
| "Reach" | 2006 | Reach, Rock the Bones Vol. 4 | Survivor |
| "Fire Make Steel" | 2006 | Reach, Rock the Bones Vol. 5 | Survivor |
| "Come Dancin" | 2007 | The Demos 07 | Jimi Jamison & Jim Peterik |
| "When Rock Was King" | 2008 | Crossroads Moment | Jimi Jamison |
| "Alive" | 2008 | Crossroads Moment | Jimi Jamison |
| "Streets of Heaven" | 2009 | Crossroads Moment | Jimi Jamison |
| "The Vine" | 2009 | Secret Weapon | Howard Leese & Jimi Jamison |
| "House That Love Built" | 2010 | Ronald McDonald House of Memphis | Jimi Jamison |
| "I Wanna Touch There" | 2010, 2013 | Extra Moments, Single | Jimi Jamison & Jim Peterik |
| "Heart of a Woman" | 2010, 2012 | Extra Moments, Unreleased Music | Jimi Jamison & Jim Peterik |
| "Can't Wait for Love" | 2011 | Kimball Jamison | Jimi Jamison & Bobby Kimball |
| "Worth Fighting For" | 2011 | Kimball Jamison | Jimi Jamison & Bobby Kimball |
| "Find Another Way" | 2011 | Kimball Jamison | Jimi Jamison & Bobby Kimball |
| "Sail Away" | 2011 | Kimball Jamison | Jimi Jamison & Bobby Kimball |
| "Long Time" | 2011 | History | One Man's Trash feat. Jimi Jamison & Fred Zahl |
| "History" | 2011 | History | One Man's Trash feat. Jimi Jamison & Fred Zahl |
| "Restless Kind" | 2012 | History, Restless Kind | One Man's Trash feat. Jimi Jamison & Fred Zahl |
| "Tears in My Eyes" | 2012 | History, Restless Kind | One Man's Trash feat. Jimi Jamison & Fred Zahl |
| "Comin' Home" | 2012 | Naked But Dressed | Dominoe feat. Jimi Jamison |
| "Never Too Late" | 2012 | Never Too Late | Jimi Jamison |
| "Everybody's Got a Broken Heart" | 2012 | Never Too Late | Jimi Jamison |
| "It Wouldn't Feel Like Christmas" | 2012 | Single | Jimi Jamison |
| "The Sound of Home" | 2012 | Unreleased Music | Jimi Jamison |
| "A Kiss to Remember You By" | 2012 | Unreleased Music | Jimi Jamison |
| "Space Cowboy" | 2013 | Fly Like an Eagle: An All-Star Tribute to the Steve Miller Band | Jimi Jamison & Jordan Reduss |
| "Days of Wine Roses" | 2013 | Karmalion | Indicco feat. Jimi Jamison |
| "Feel So Good" | 2013 | Karmalion | Indicco feat. Jimi Jamison |
| "Ride the Wave" | 2013 | Karmalion | Indicco feat. Jimi Jamison |
| "L.A. Woman" | 2014 | Light My Fire: A Classic Rock Salute to the Doors | Jimi Jamison, Ted Turner & Patrick Moraz |
| "Mama" | 2014 | Single | One Man's Trash feat. Jimi Jamison & Fred Zahl |
| "Summer Rains" | 2015 | F4ur | Radioactive feat. Jimi Jamison |
| "Forever Ended Today" | 2015 | Red Blooded American Girl | Gema Pearl feat. Jimi Jamison |
| "Love You All Over the World" | 2019 | Winds of Change | Jim Peterik feat. Jimi Jamison |

=== Music videos ===
| Title Song | Year | Album | Artist |
|---|---|---|---|
| "Blood On Your Money" | 1983 | First Strike | Cobra |
| "Looking at You" | 1983 | First Strike | Cobra |
| "The Moment of Truth" | 1984 | The Karate Kid Soundtrack, Vital Signs (by Rock Candy in 2009) | Survivor |
| "I Can't Hold Back" | 1984 | Vital Signs | Survivor |
| "High On You" | 1985 | Vital Signs | Survivor |
| "The Search is Over" | 1985 | Vital Signs | Survivor |
| "Burning Heart" | 1985 | Rocky IV Soundtrack, When Seconds Count (by Rock Candy in 2009) | Survivor |
| "Is This Love" | 1986 | When Seconds Count | Survivor |
| "Man Against The World" | 1987 | When Seconds Count, Rocky IV Soundtrack (2006 reissue) | Survivor |
| "In Good Faith" | 1987 | When Seconds Count | Survivor |
| "Didn't Know it Was Love" | 1988 | To Hot To Sleep | Survivor |
| "Across the Miles" | 1989 | To Hot To Sleep | Survivor |
| "Taste of Love" | 1992 | When Love Comes Down, Baywatch, Jersey Girl Soundtrack | Jimi Jamison |
| "I'm Always Here" | 1993 | Baywatch Theme Song, Empires | Jimi Jamison |
| "I Believe in You" | 1995 | A song for the Children | Jimi Jamison |
| "Eye of the Tiger" | 2004 | Starbucks Commercial | Survivor |
| "When Rock Was King" | 2008 | Crossroads Moment | Jimi Jamison |
| "Can't Wait For Love" | 2011 | Kimball Jamison | Jimi Jamison & Bobby Kimball |
| "Worth Fighting For" | 2011 | Kimball Jamison | Jimi Jamison & Bobby Kimball |
| "Sail Away" | 2011 | Kimball Jamison | Jimi Jamison & Bobby Kimball |
| "Long Time" | 2011 | History | One Man's Trash Feat. Jimi Jamison & Fred Zahl |
| "Can't Find My Way Home" | 2012 | Tribute for Japan | Jimi Jamison |
| "Never Too Late" | 2012 | Never Too Late | Jimi Jamison |
| "Forever Ended Today" | 2015 | Red Blooded American Girl | Gema Pearl Feat. Jimi Jamison |

=== Soundtracks ===
- 1984 The Karate Kid: (performer: "The Moment of Truth")
- 1985 Rocky IV: (performer: "Burning Heart")
- 1985 Rocky IV Soundtrack: (performer: "Man Against the World")
- 1989 Lock Up: (performer: "Ever Since The World Began")
- 1991–2001 Baywatch (TV Series) (lyrics – performer: "I'm Always Here")
- Baywatch (TV Series) (lyrics – 2 episodes, 1991) (performer – 2 episodes, 1991) – Nightmare Bay: Part 2 (1991) (lyrics: "I'm Always Here") / (performer: "Rock Hard", "I'm Always Here") – Nightmare Bay: Part 1 (1991) (lyrics: "I'm Always Here") / (performer: "I'm Always Here", "Rock Hard")
- Baywatch (TV Series) (performer – 1 episode, 1992) – "Lifeguards Can't Jump" (1992) (performer: "Taste of Love")
- 1992 Jersey Girl: (performer: "Taste of Love")
- 1998 Wrongfully Accused: (performer: "I'm Always Here")
- 2001 Spy Game: (performer: "I'm Always Here")
- 2001 Mrs. Death 3: (performer: "The Search Is Over")
- Johnny Bravo (TV Series) (performer – 1 episode) – Get Shovelized/T Is for Trouble (2004) (performer: "You Gotta Be")
- 2005 The 40 Year Old Virgin: (performer: "The Search is Over")
- 2005 Kicking & Screaming: (performer: "Eye of the Tiger")
- 2007 Psych (TV Series): (performer: "Burning Heart" – 1 episode)
- Video on Trial (TV Series) (performer – 1 episode) – Totally Beachin' Video on Trial (2008) ... (performer: "I'm Always Here")
- The Xtra Factor (TV Series) (lyrics – 1 episode, 2008) (performer – 1 episode, 2008) – Episode 5.9 (2008) (lyrics: "I'm Always Here") / (performer: "I'm Always Here")
- 2009 Paul Blart: Mall Cop (performer: "I Can't Hold Back")
- 2011 Formula 1: BBC Sport (TV Series) (performer – 1 episode) – The Malaysia Grand Prix: Qualifying (2011) (performer: "Burning Heart")
- Britain's Got Talent (TV Series) (lyrics – 1 episode, 2011) (performer – 1 episode, 2011) – 2011: Auditions 1 (2011) (lyrics: "I'm Always Here") / (performer: "I'm Always Here")
- 2012 Piranha 3DD: (performer: "I'm Always Here")
- 2012 Hansi Hinterseer – Traumhaftes Seenland im Salzkammergut (TV Movie) (performer: "I'm Always Here")
- 2013 Grand Theft Auto V (Video Game) (performer: "Burning Heart")
- 2014 The Goldbergs (TV Series) (performer – 1 episode) – You Opened the Door (2014) (performer: "The Search Is Over")
- Mike and Mike in the Morning (TV Series) (lyrics – 1 episode, 2014) (performer – 1 episode, 2014) – Episode September 2, 2014 (lyrics: "I'm Always Here") / (performer: "I'm Always Here")
- Tosh.0 (TV Series) (performer – 1 episode, 2016) (writer – 1 episode, 2016) – Climate Change Comedian (2016) (performer: "I'll Be Ready") / (writer: "I'll Be Ready")
- 2017 Pasapalabra (TV Series) (performer – 1 episode) – Episode 2.4 (2017) (performer: "Burning Heart")
- 2017 Baywatch (Movie) (performer: "I'm Always Here") / (writer: "I'm Always Here" – as Jimmy Jamison)
- The Tonight Show Starring Jimmy Fallon (TV Series) (lyrics – 1 episode) – Dwayne Johnson/Ellie Kemper/Charlie Puth (2017) (lyrics: "I'm Always Here")
- 2018 And They're Off... for Sport Relief (TV Series) (performer – 1 episode) – Episodio 1.1 (2018) (performer: "Burning Heart")
- Die Magie des Eises: Linzer Eiszauber 2018 (TV Movie) (performer: "I'll Be Ready")
- Coast Lives (TV Series documentary) (lyrics – 1 episode, 2018) (performer – 1 episode, 2018) – Episode 1.1 (2018) (lyrics: "I'm Always Here") / (performer: "I'm Always Here")
- Piers Morgan's Life Stories (TV Series) (lyrics – 1 episode, 2018) (performer – 1 episode, 2018) – Pamela Anderson (2018) (lyrics: "I'm Always Here") / (performer: "I'm Always Here")
- Good Morning Britain (TV Series) (performer – 4 episodes, 2017–2018) (lyrics – 3 episodes, 2017–2018) (writer – 1 episode, 2017) – Episode April 17, 2018 (lyrics: "I'm Always Here") / (performer: "I'm Always Here") – Episode May 19, 2017 (lyrics: "I'm Always Here") / (performer: "I'm Always Here") – Episode May 16, 2017 (performer: "I'm Always Here") / (writer: "I'm Always Here") – Episode May 15, 2017 (lyrics: "I'm Always Here") / (performer: "I'm Always Here")
- Britain's Got More Talent (TV Series) (lyrics – 1 episode, 2018) (performer – 1 episode, 2018) – Episode 12.12 (2018) (lyrics: "I'm Always Here") / (performer: "I'm Always Here")
- Wedding Day Winners (TV Series) (performer – 1 episode) – Episode 1.5 (2018) (performer: "I'm Always Here")
