= When Love Comes Down =

Studio album by Jimi Jamison
- Released: July 9, 1991
- Studio: Ocean Way Recording (Hollywood, California); Studio Sound Recorders (North Hollywood, California); Kiva Recording Studios and Ardent Studios (Memphis, Tennessee)
- Genre: Rock
- Length: 42:53
- Label: Scotti Brothers, Top Notch Records
- Producer: Shel Talmy, Kenny Mims and Jim Gaines

Jimi Jamison chronology
When Love Comes Down (1991)	Empires (1999)

Singles from When Love Comes Down
- 1. "Taste of Love" Released: 1991; 2. "Rock Hard" Released: 1991; 3. "When Love Comes Down" Released: 1991

When Love Comes Down is the first solo studio album from the former Survivor lead singer Jimi Jamison (after the band decided to go on hiatus following lackluster sales of their 1988 Too Hot to Sleep album) released on July 9, 1991, on Scotti Brothers and Top Notch Records. It featured the singles "Taste of Love", "Rock Hard" and the album's title track. The album was anticipated to perform better than Survivor's Too Hot to Sleep but only managed marginal success, featuring a couple singles that appeared in movies and TV series soundtracks.

The album was produced by Shel Talmy, Kenny Mims and Jim Gaines, distributed by RMG and published by Mofo Music BMI. While Jamison was starting to work on his solo career, he was asked to joined Deep Purple at the moment (to replace their iconic frontman Ian Gillan), but his managers and labels wanted him to concentrate his attention on his album and remain available for a possible Survivor reunion.

== Track listing ==
No.	Title	Writer(s)	Length
1.	"Taste of Love"	Brett Walker & Carl Dixon	3:57
2.	"Johnny's Got A Shotgun"	Hal McCormack & Jimi Jamison	4:39
3.	"When Love Comes Down"	Jimi Jamison & Randy Cantor	4:55
4.	"Long Walk Home"	Jimi Jamison & Randy Cantor	4:49
5.	"True Lovers"	Jimi Jamison & Kenny Mims	3:55
6.	"If You Walk Away"	Skip Adams & Todd Cerney	4:07
7.	"Cry Alone"	Jimi Jamison & Kenny Mims	4:11
8.	"I Believe In Love"	Jesse Harms	3:55
9.	"Rock Hard"	Jimi Jamison, John Roth & Scott Trammell	4:40
10.	"Angry Young Man"	Jimi Jamison & Kenny Mims	4:02
Total length:			42:53

== Personnel ==
- Jimi Jamison – lead vocals, arrangements
- Kim Bullard – grand piano, keyboards, arrangements
- Randy Cantor – keyboards, programming
- Bill Cuomo – keyboards
- Kenny Mims – keyboards, programming, acoustic guitars, electric guitars, bass, backing vocals, arrangements
- Teddy Castellucci – acoustic guitars, electric guitars
- Carl Dixon – guitars, backing vocals
- Kenny Greenberg – electric guitars
- Shawn Lane – guitars
- Hal McCormack – electric guitars
- John Roth – electric guitars, backing vocals
- David Cochran – bass
- James Hutchinson – bass
- Craig Krampf – drums
- Steve Mergen – drums, percussion
- Scott Trammell – drums, percussion
- Tom Walsh – drums
- John Hampton – tambourine
- Shel Talmy – tambourine, arrangements
- Greg Smith – horns
- John Berry – horns
- Lee Thornburg – horns, horn arrangements
- Tom Tinko – horns
- Michael Black – backing vocals
- Sam Bryant – backing vocals
- Jimmy Davis – backing vocals
- Bruce Hall – backing vocals
- Damon Johnson – backing vocals
- Gary O'Connor – backing vocals
- Brett Walker – backing vocals

=== Production ===
- Jim Zumwalt – executive producer
- Kelly Morrison – executive production assistant
- Lori Nafshun – A&R
- Shel Talmy – producer (1–6, 8, 10)
- Jim Gaines – producer (7–10), engineer, mixing
- Kenny Mims – producer (7–10)
- Tony Papa – engineer
- Howard Lee Wolen – engineer
- John Hampton – mixing, additional engineer
- Doug Nightwine – additional engineer
- Wolfgang Aichholz – assistant engineer
- Tony Alvarez – assistant engineer
- Michelle Bundy – assistant engineer
- Skip Burzumato – assistant engineer
- Greg Grill – assistant engineer
- Mark Guilbeaulet – assistant engineer
- James Jowers – assistant engineer
- Evan Rush – assistant engineer
- Larry Wood – assistant engineer
- Doug Sax – mastering at The Mastering Lab (Hollywood, California)
- Lisa Rider – production coordinator
- Doug Haverty – art direction
- Luis M. Fernández – design
- Jeff Katz – photography

== Popular culture/covers/soundtracks ==
The album managed to have a couple of songs on some movies soundtracks and TV series:

"Rock Hard" was featured in the Baywatch episodes, "Nightmare Bay: Part 2". "Taste of Love" appeared in the Baywatch episode "Lifeguards Can't Jump" as well as the 1992 romantic film Jersey Girl.

Jamison covers the song "If You Walk Away" written by Skip Adams & Todd Cerney.

In 1989, Jamison contributed his own version of "Ever Since the World Began," a song Survivor had initially recorded prior to his tenure in the band, to the film Lock Up. He released the CD with a B-Side "Cry Alone" (song from this album) thanks to CBS label.
