= SongCast Music Distribution =

SongCast
- Industry: Music
- Founded: 2006
- Founder: Nate Darko
- Headquarters: Akron, Ohio, United States
- Area served: Worldwide
- Products: Digital Music Distribution
- Website: songcastmusic.com

SongCast is a digital music distribution company based in Akron, Ohio. It has a web platform where musicians upload and track sales of their musical compositions on Apple Music, Spotify, Pandora and SoundCloud.

== History ==
According to Mashable, SongCast delivers music to the top 5 music outlets, including Amazon. In 2017, Forbes reported the company had paid out approximately $24 million to artists signed with the service and also launched a competing app alongside its longer-standing distribution partnerships with iTunes, Pandora, Spotify, Apple Music.

== Musicians and characters on SongCast ==
- Peter Beckett of soft rock band Player uses SongCast to distribute albums from Player, including Spies of Life.
- Bubba the Love Sponge, host of The Bubba the Love Sponge Show uses SongCast to distribute his original content.
- Jimi Jamison of the rock band Survivor has albums distributed by SongCast, including Never Too Late.
- Australian rock band Wolfmother used SongCast to distribute their latest album, New Crown.
- Country rock musician and son of country star Waylon Jennings, Shooter Jennings, distributed his 2011 album, Outlaw You, through SongCast as a digital exclusive.
