= Crossroads Moment =

Studio album by Jimi Jamison
- Released: July 11, 2008
- Studio: World Stage Studios (Chicago, Illinois)
- Genre: Rock
- Length: 78:11
- Label: Frontiers Records
- Producer: Jim Peterik and Larry Millas

Jimi Jamison chronology
Empires (1999)	Crossroads Moment (2008)	Extra Moments (2010)

Singles from Crossroads Moment
- 1. "When Rock Was King" Released: 2008; 2. "Alive" Released: 2009; 3. "Streets of Heaven" Released: 2009

Crossroads Moment is the third album by American singer-songwriter Jimi Jamison released in Europe on July 11, 2008 for Frontiers Records. The album was produced by Jim Peterik, distributed in Germany by Soulfood Music and released in the United States in 2009. The big accomplish of the album is that was voted #3 album of the year in Europe. The sound of the album mixes Jamison's classic AOR voice with the Peterik sound established since his days in Survivor. There is one music video of the single "When Rock Was King" and two Europe and Japanese bonus tracks, "Alive" and "Streets of Heaven".

== Track listing ==
All tracks are written by Jim Peterik.

No.	Title	Length
1.	"Battersea"	5:29
2.	"Can't Look Away"	4:44
3.	"Make Me a Believer"	4:15
4.	"Crossroads Moment"	4:57
5.	"Bittersweet"	4:55
6.	"Behind The Music"	5:32
7.	"Lost"	4:54
8.	"Love The World Away"	4:56
9.	"She's Nothing To Me"	3:41
10.	"As Is"	4:54
11.	"'Till The Morning Comes"	4:28
12.	"That's Why I Sing"	4:53
13.	"Friends We've Never Met"	5:24
14.	"When Rock Was King"	6:40

Bonus tracks
No.	Title	Writer(s)	Length
15.	"Alive"	Jim Peterik, Jonny Van Zant & Donnie Van Zant	4:30
16.	"Streets of Heaven"	Jim Peterik	3:42
Total length:			78:11

== Personnel ==
- Jimi Jamison – lead vocals, backing vocals
- Christian Cullen – keyboards
- Jeff Lanz – keyboards
- Jim Peterik – keyboards, guitars, backing vocals
- Scott May – Hammond B3 organ (15)
- Tommy Denander – electric guitar (1)
- Mike Aquino – guitars
- Joel Hoekstra – guitars
- Klem Hayes – bass
- Bill Syniar – bass
- Ed Breckenfeld – drums (1, 2, 4-16)
- Kelly Keagy – drums (3)
- Thom Griffin – backing vocals
- Lisa McClowry – backing vocals (15)

Choir on "When Rock Was King"

- Don Barnes, Dave Bickler, Jimi Jamison, Jim Peterik, Mike Reno, Mickey Thomas and Joe Lynn Turner

=== Production ===
- Serafino Perugino – executive producer
- Jeremy Holiday – A&R
- Jim Peterik – producer, mixing
- Larry Millas – producer, recording, mixing, mastering
- Giulio Cataldo – artwork, design, photography
