= Never Too Late (Jimi Jamison album) =

2012 album by Jimi Jamison

Studio album by Jimi Jamison
- Released: November 2, 2012
- Genre: Rock
- Length: 56:38
- Label: Frontiers Records
- Producer: Erik Martensson

Jimi Jamison chronology
Kimball Jamison (2011)	Never Too Late (2012)

Singles from Never Too Late
- 1. "Never Too Late" Released: 2012; 2. "Everybody's Got a Broken Heart" Released: 2012

Never Too Late is the sixth and final album by the American singer-songwriter Jimi Jamison, released on November 2, 2012, by Frontiers Records. The album is produced by Erik Mårtensson, who also co-wrote all the songs. Jamison's daughter Lacy E. Jamison is on backing vocals in "Heaven Call Your Name" and there is a Japanese bonus track, the acoustic version of "Everybody's Got a Broken Heart".

== Track listing ==
No.	Title	Writer(s)	Length
1.	"Everybody's Got a Broken Heart"	Erik Mårtensson, Magnus Henriksson & Miqael Persson	3:38
2.	"The Great Unknown"	Erik Mårtensson, Magnus Henriksson & Miqael Persson	4:03
3.	"Never Too Late"	Erik Mårtensson & Miqael Persson	4:57
4.	"I Can't Turn Back"	Erik Mårtensson & Miqael Persson	4:19
5.	"Street Survivor"	Erik Mårtensson & Miqael Persson	4:07
6.	"The Air That I Breathe"	Erik Mårtensson & Miqael Persson	4:43
7.	"Not Tonight"	Erik Mårtensson, Magnus Henriksson & Miqael Persson	5:58
8.	"Calling the Game"	Erik Mårtensson & Miqael Persson	4:44
9.	"Bullet in the Gun"	Erik Mårtensson, Magnus Henriksson & Miqael Persson	4:25
10.	"Heaven Call Your Name"	Erik Mårtensson, Magnus Henriksson & Miqael Persson	4:10
11.	"Walk On (Wildest Dreams)"	Erik Mårtensson & Miqael Persson	4:13

Bonus track
No.	Title	Writer(s)	Length
12.	"Everybody's Got a Broken Heart (Acoustic)"	Erik Mårtensson, Magnus Henriksson & Miqael Persson	3:39
Total length:			56:38

== Personnel ==
- Jimi Jamison - Lead vocals
- Erik Mårtensson - Backing vocals, bass, keyboards, lead and rhythm guitars
- Jonas Öijvall - Analog synthesizers, Hammond B3 and piano
- Magnus Henriksson - Lead guitar
- Magnus Ulfstedt - Drums
