= Extra Moments =

Studio album by Jimi Jamison & Jim Peterik
- Released: July 23, 2010
- Genre: Rock, AOR
- Length: 48:17
- Label: MelodicRock Records
- Producer: Jim Peterik, Larry Millas

Jimi Jamison & Jim Peterik chronology
Crossroads Moment (2008)	Extra Moments (2010)	Kimball Jamison (2011)

Singles from Extra Moments
- 1. "I Wanna Touch You There" Released: 2010; 2. "Dream Higher" Released: 2010

Extra Moments is an album by former Survivor members Jimi Jamison and Jim Peterik, released on July 23, 2010 by MelodicRock Records. The album contains demos and unused songs from the Crossroads Moment recording sessions that Jamison and Peterik originally put together to benefit melodicrock.com. The album was released in Australia, Russia and rest of Europe.

== Track listing ==
No.	Title	Writer(s)	Length
1.	"Dream Higher"	Jim Peterik, Jimi Jamison & Kelly Keagy	4:17
2.	"Chiseled in Stone"	Jim Peterik	4:35
3.	"Cry of The Wild Heart"	Jim Peterik	4:37
4.	"Heart of a Woman"	Jim Peterik	4:18
5.	"Life #9"	Jim Peterik & Tommy Denander	3:46
6.	"I Wanna Touch You There"	Jim Peterik	2:53
7.	"Lifeforce"	Jim Peterik	5:52
8.	"Chiseled in Stone (Demo)"	Jim Peterik	4:47
9.	"She's Nothing To Me (Demo)"	Jim Peterik	3:35
10.	"Lifeforce (Demo)"	Jim Peterik	5:56
11.	"Life #9 (Demo)"	Jim Peterik & Tommy Denander	3:42

Bonus Track
No.	Title	Writer(s)	Length
12.	"Battersea (Demo)"	Jim Peterik	5:19
Total length:			48:17
