= I'm Always Here =

1991 song by Jimi Jamison

Single by Jimi Jamison

from the album Empires
- Released: 1993 (1991 in TV)
- Genre: Rock
- Length: 4:03 (album version, 1999); 3:22 (single version, 1993)
- Songwriters: Jimi Jamison; Joe Henry; Cory Lerios; John D'Andrea
- Producers: Cory Lerios; John D'Andrea

Jimi Jamison singles chronology
"When Love Comes Down" (1991)	"I'm Always Here" (1993)	"Have Mercy" (1996)

"I'm Always Here" (also known as "I'll Be Ready") is a song by Jimi Jamison most recognized as the theme of seasons two through ten of the popular 1990s TV series Baywatch.

Jamison is credited as the lyricist on this song, along with Joe Henry who co-wrote the Rascal Flatts hit "Skin" (not to be mistaken for the Joe Henry who wrote Madonna's "Don't Tell Me"). The music is credited to Cory Lerios and John D'Andrea.

Songfacts website wrote that the line "I won't let you out of my sight," while appropriate song for a TV series about lifeguards, could be related to a commitment to a girl, telling her that the singer will always be there for her. However, Jamison himself wrote in his original handwritten song notes that there was another meaning.

"A twist of lyrical fate"-
Lifeguards save thousands of lives each year. The producers of Baywatch thought these lyrics were only about those heroes ... but every hero needs a little help from above to be able to do what they do. So I wrote these lyrics as if GOD was speaking to them and us. Telling us all that he is always with us watching over us.

Funny as it may seem, the only person who really understood the lyrics was a writer at Playboy Magazine who in one of their issues broke the song down line per line and explained what the song was really saying. He was spot on ! If I remember correctly, the heading of his article was "Baywatch theme is obviously a christian theme"

An instrumental version was used as the ending theme of seasons 6 to 9 and a different instrumental version was used as the theme for season 10 (the first season of Baywatch: Hawaii).

== Music video ==
The music video for "I'm Always Here" features Jimi Jamison performing throughout the bay, mixed with scenes from the TV series.

== Other versions ==
Other versions of "I'm Always Here" include:

- The instrumental version of the song was featured in the outro of the show in later seasons.
- The album version is melodically different from the single version due to the year release of both. While the single version reached the top ten of America's Greatest Hits in 1996, the album version entered the top 100 in the German charts in 1999.
- An instrumental version of the song appears in the episode "Battles" of the UK television program Spaced.
- Swedish electronic music group Sunblock remixed the song and released it under the title "I'll Be Ready" on 9 January 2006. This version, from the album of the same name, reached number 12 in Sweden, number four in the United Kingdom, and number eight in Denmark.
- German dance act Bass Bumpers had a UK hit single in 2006 with a mash-up of the song and "Phat Planet" by Leftfield. This new version was entitled "Phat Beach (I'll Be Ready)" (with the group being credited as Naughty Boy on this Ministry of Sound release) and reached number 36 on the UK Singles Chart.
- A soundalike version was used in the Hey Arnold! episode "Summer Love" over the end credits.
- Swedish group Konditorns recorded the theme with Swedish lyrics for their album K2 (2012), titled "Jag är alltid här" which is a direct translation of the phrase "I'm always here".
- In 2005, Andrew Spencer created a house version of the song featuring Pit Bailay on vocals.

== In popular culture ==
The song is well used in different soundtracks:

- 1991–2001 Baywatch (TV series)
- 1998 Wrongfully Accused
- 2001 Spy Game
- Video on Trial (TV series) Totally Beachin' Video on Trial (2008)
- The Xtra Factor (TV series) episode #5.9 (2008)
- Britain's Got Talent (TV series) Auditions 1 (2011)
- 2012 Piranha 3DD
- 2012 Hansi Hinterseer – Traumhaftes Seenland im Salzkammergut (TV movie)
- Mike and Mike in the Morning (TV series) episode September 2, 2014
- Tosh.0 (TV series) Climate Change Comedian (2016)
- American Dad! (TV series) episode "Bahama Mama" (2016)
- 2017 Baywatch movie
- The Tonight Show Starring Jimmy Fallon (TV series) episode – Dwayne Johnson/Ellie Kemper/Charlie Puth (2017)
- Die Magie des Eises: Linzer Eiszauber 2018 (TV movie)
- Coast Lives (TV series documentary) episode #1.1 (2018)
- Piers Morgan's Life Stories (TV series) episode – Pamela Anderson (2018)
- Good Morning Britain (TV series) – episodes May 15, 2017; May 16, 2017; May 19, 2017; April 17, 2018
- Britain's Got More Talent (TV series) episode #12.12 (2018)
- Wedding Day Winners (TV series) episode #1.5 (2018)
