= Kimball Jamison =

Studio album by Jimi Jamison and Bobby Kimball
- Released: October 14, 2011
- Recorded: Los Angeles, US
- Studio: Stuttgart, Germany
- Genre: Hard rock
- Length: 53:34
- Label: Frontiers Records
- Producer: Mat Sinner

Jimi Jamison and Bobby Kimball chronology
Extra Moments (2010)	Kimball Jamison (2011)	Never Too Late (2012)

Singles from Kimball Jamison
- 1. "Can't Wait For Love" Released: 2011; 2. "Worth Fighting For" Released: 2011; 3. "Find Another Way" Released: 2011; 4. "Sail Away" Released: 2011

Kimball Jamison is a duo album from the American rock singers Jimi Jamison (Survivor) and Bobby Kimball (Toto), released on October 14, 2011 by Frontiers Records.

The album was produced by German bassist, singer and music producer Mat Sinner from Primal Fear. Alexander Beyrodt was the guitarist for the album. Jamison and Kimball finished the lead vocal recordings in Los Angeles while the instrumental part was recorded in Germany. The songs on the album were written by several songwriters, including:

- Richard Page (Mr Mister)
- Randy Goodrum (Toto, Steve Perry)
- Robert Sall (Work of Art)
- John Waite
- Jim Peterik

among others.

== Track listing ==
No.	Title	Writer(s)	Length
1.	"Worth Fighting For"	Hanif Sabzevari & Robert Säll	4:52
2.	"Can't Wait For Love"	Hanif Sabzevari & Robert Säll	3:54
3.	"Sail Away"	John Lang & Richard Page	4:35
4.	"Chasing Euphoria"	Jim Peterik	3:46
5.	"Find Another Way"	Henrik Wikström, NiklasEdberger & Randy Goodrum	4:14
6.	"Get Back in the Game"	Erik Martensson & Miqael Persson	3:10
7.	"I Did Everything Wrong"	Erik Martensson & Miqael Persson	3:53
8.	"Shadows of Love"	Jeff Kent, John Waite & Norman Mershon	4:18
9.	"Hearts Beat Again"	FerpaLacerda, FilipeBeyer & Gui Oliver	4:57
10.	"We Gotta Believe"	John Lang, Richard Page & Robert Page	4:23
11.	"Kicking and Screaming"	Erik Martensson & Miqael Persson	3:56
12.	"Your Photograph"	Henrik Wikström, NiklasEdberger & Randy Goodrum	3:57

DVD and Bonus Track
No.	Title	Writer(s)	Length
13.	"Sail Away (Acoustic Version)"	John Lang & Richard Page	4:35
14.	"Can't Wait For Love (Music Video)"	Hanif Sabzevari & Robert Säll	4:52
15.	"Worth Fighting For (Music Video)"	Hanif Sabzevari & Robert Säll	3:54
Total length:			53:34

== Personnel ==
- Bobby Kimball - lead vocals, backing vocals
- Jimi Jamison - lead vocals, backing vocals
- Alex Beyrodt - guitars, lead guitar
- Mat Sinner - bass
- Jimmy Kresic - keyboards
- Martin Schmidt - drums and percussion.
