= Target (American band) =

American southern rock band

- Origin: Memphis, Tennessee
- Genre: Southern rock
- Years active: 1974–1979
- Label: A&M Records
- Past members: Jimi Jamison – lead vocals; Paul Cannon – guitar; Buddy Davis – guitar; Tommy Cathey – bass; David Spain – drums

Target was a Southern rock band from Memphis, Tennessee, that formed in the early 1970s. The band consisted of singer Jimi Jamison, guitarists Buddy Davis and Paul Cannon, Tommy Cathey on bass, and drummer David Spain. The group released a pair of albums for A&M Records with 3 singles. A third album (released by Scape Music in 2017) was recorded in 1979, entitled In Range before the band split in 1982.

== History (1974–1980) ==
In the early 1971, Jamison was playing in a band called Omaha with Roy Howell who was the songwriter, and handled the electric guitars, mandolins and mandolute. Jamison was lead vocalist, along with Tommy Cathey (bass), Walter Polk (drums), and David Mayo (piano). After releasing the song "Open Mind," which was recorded, engineered and quick-mixed by J.R. Williams at Trans-Maximus (TMI) Studio in Memphis, several band members wanted to explore performing original music and ended up backing David Beaver on his Combinations project (released under the moniker D. Beaver). Eventually, they decided to break out on their own and formed Target.

Target became an arena local band playing live constantly to build up their reputation. Eventually they were signed by A&M Records at the High Cotton Club in Memphis in February 1975. Their first album came the next year with a cover of the song "99 and Half" on their first album [originally from Sister Rosetta Tharpe and her mother (Katie Bell Nubin) with Sam Price Trio in 1949]. The band opened concerts for Black Sabbath, Boston, and Kiss. The group went down well live, but did not translate into the kind of record sales that had been hoped for.

The second album (Captured, 1977) saw the band's sound become more sophisticated and expansive. The band went out on tour with Boston again. However, A&M were unimpressed by the sales of Captured and dropped Target from their roster. Target struggled on without a record deal until the early 1980s, before finally calling it a day. They won many loyal fans over their time together, and continued to pack venues down the years whenever there was the occasional Target reunion (as in 1989).

== Final recording and late release ==
In Range was recorded in the autumn of 1979: it took the band about two to three weeks to do this third album and it was released by Scape Music Label in 2017.

== Discography ==
Album	Year	Label
Target	1976	A&M Records
Captured	1977	A&M Records
In Range	2017 (1979 recorded)	Scape Music

=== Singles ===
Title Song	Album	Year	Label
"Are You Ready"	Target	1976	A&M Records
"Let Me Live"	Target	1976	A&M Records
"It's Only Love"	Captured	1977	A&M Records
