= Jersey Girl (1992 film) =

1992 film directed by David Burton Morris

- Theatrical release poster
- Directed by: David Burton Morris
- Written by: Gina Wendkos
- Produced by: Staffan Ahrenberg; David Madden; Nicole Seguin
- Starring: Jami Gertz; Dylan McDermott; Sheryl Lee; Aida Turturro; Molly Price
- Edited by: Norman Hollyn
- Music by: Misha Segal
- Production companies: Electric Pictures; Interscope
- Distributed by: Triumph Releasing Corporation
- Release dates: June 17, 1992 (France); August 1, 1992 (USA)
- Running time: 95 minutes
- Country: United States
- Language: English
- Budget: $5.5 million

Jersey Girl is a 1992 American romantic comedy drama film directed by David Burton Morris.

== Plot ==
Toby, a working-class preschool teacher from New Jersey, feels her life is purposeless and uninteresting. While at dinner with her friends, she decides she wants to change her fate. After talking to her friends about what the ideal man is like, she travels to New York to find him. She walks into a Mercedes-Benz dealership, but feels uncomfortable and leaves. While trying to back out of the parking lot, she nearly hits a man, named Sal, driving a brand-new car. He drives around her and leaves the parking lot, but she's smitten. She follows him down the road, and ultimately ends up causing an accident resulting in significant damage to Sal's car. They exchange information, and she decides to actively pursue him.

== Cast ==
- Jami Gertz as Toby
- Dylan McDermott as Sal
- Sheryl Lee as Tara
- Aida Turturro as Angie
- Molly Price as Cookie
- Star Jasper as Dot
- Joseph Mazzello as Jason
- Joseph Bologna as Bennie
- Philip Casnoff as Mitchell
- Pat Collins as Gabe
- Regina Taylor as Rosie
- Amy Sakasitz as Monica
- Mary Beth Peil as Day Care Center Teacher
- Jordan Dean as Tim
- Richard Maldone as Bobby

== Production ==
Jersey Girl was shot during June and July 1991. After screening the film, Columbia Pictures heads Peter Guber and Mark Canton liked the premise, but not the actual movie and decided to cancel the film's planned theatrical release so the film could be made with a larger budget and more established stars.

== Release ==
Jersey Girl was released straight-to-video release in the United States on March 30, 1994.
