= Golden Globe Award for Best Supporting Actor – Motion Picture =

Award

Golden Globe for Best Supporting Actor – Motion Picture
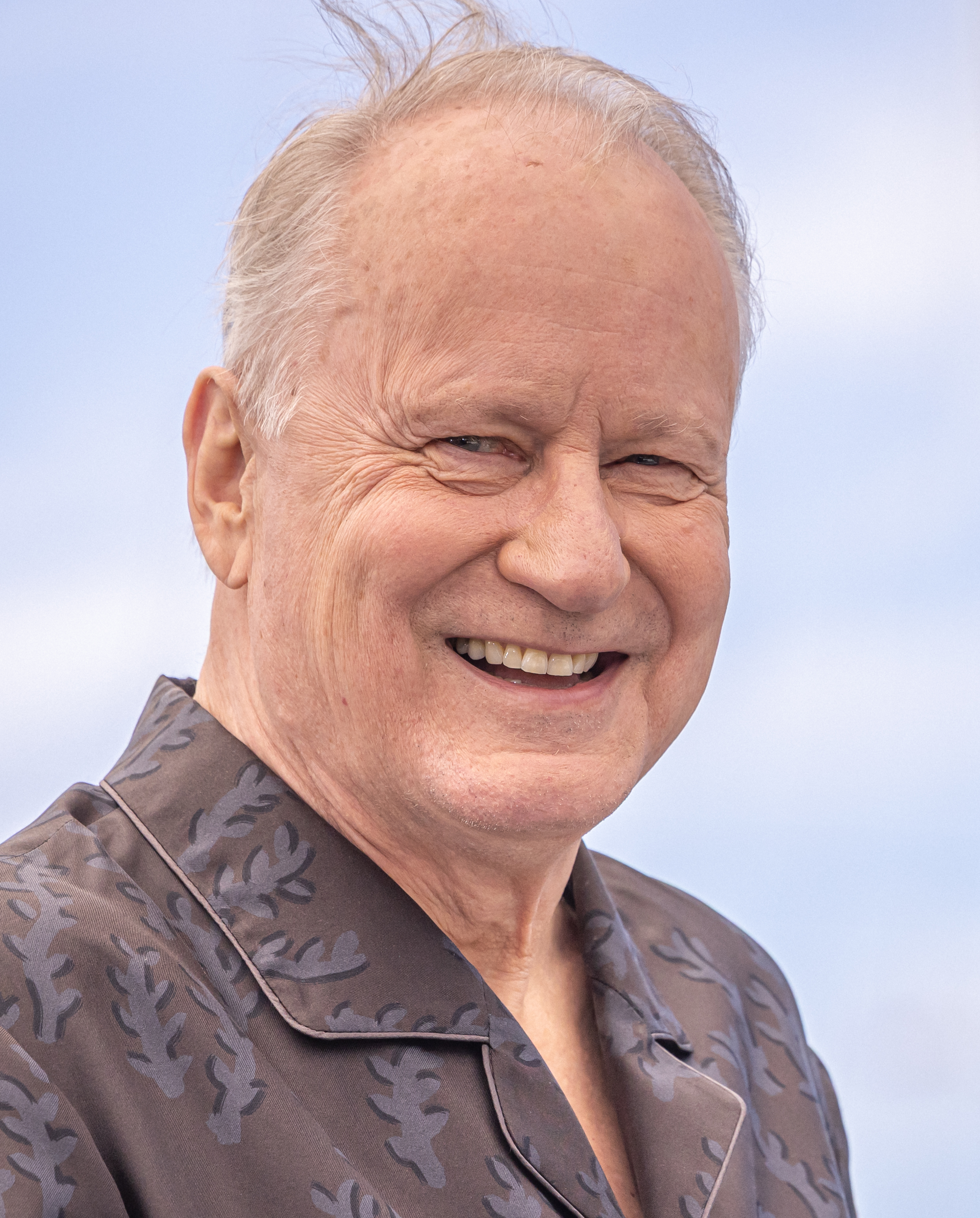
- The 2025 recipient: Stellan Skarsgård
- Awarded for: Best Performance by an Actor in a Supporting Role in a Motion Picture
- Location: United States
- Presented by: Dick Clark Productions
- Currently held by: Stellan Skarsgård for Sentimental Value (2025)
- Website: goldenglobes.com

The Golden Globe Award for Best Supporting Actor – Motion Picture is a Golden Globe Award that was first awarded by the Hollywood Foreign Press Association in 1944 for a performance in a motion picture released in the previous year. The formal title has varied since its inception; since 2005, the award has officially been called "Best Performance by an Actor in a Supporting Role in a Motion Picture". Six actors have won the award twice: Richard Attenborough, Edmund Gwenn, Martin Landau, Edmond O'Brien, Brad Pitt, and Christoph Waltz.

== Winners and nominees ==
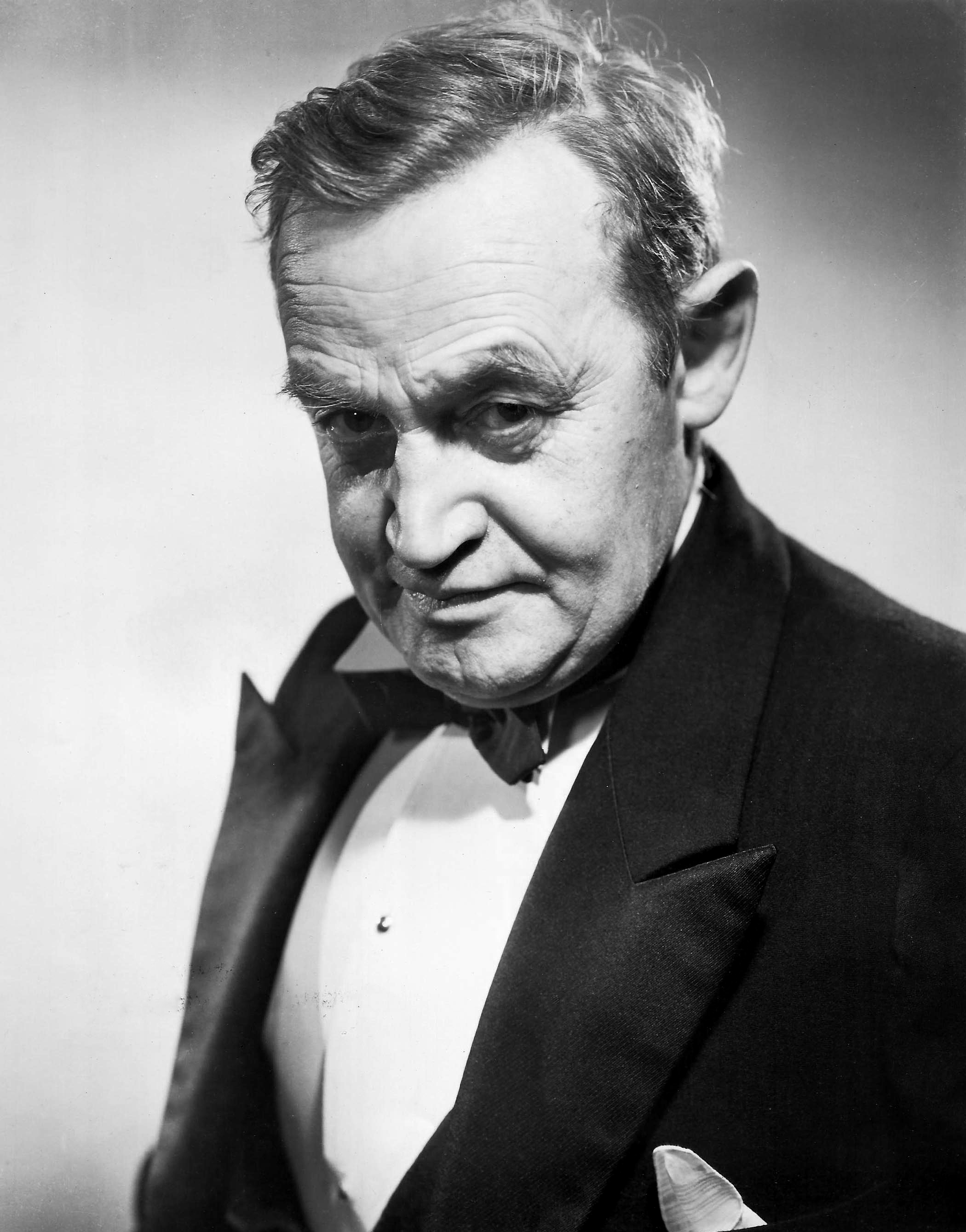
Barry Fitzgerald won for Going My Way (1945)

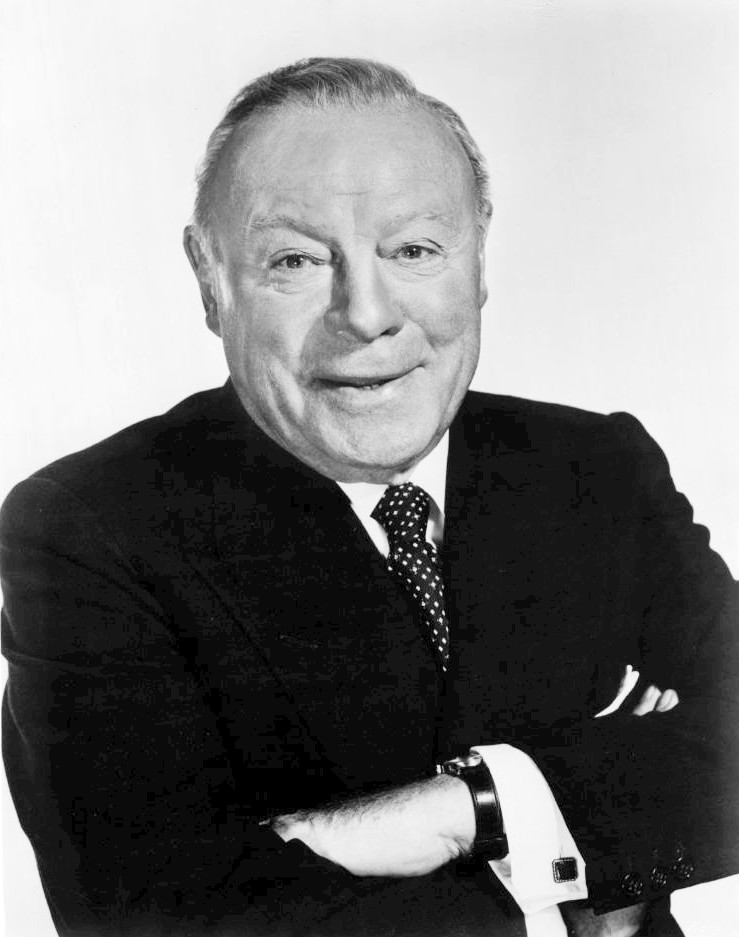
Edmund Gwenn won twice for Miracle on 34th Street (1947) and Mister 880 (1950)

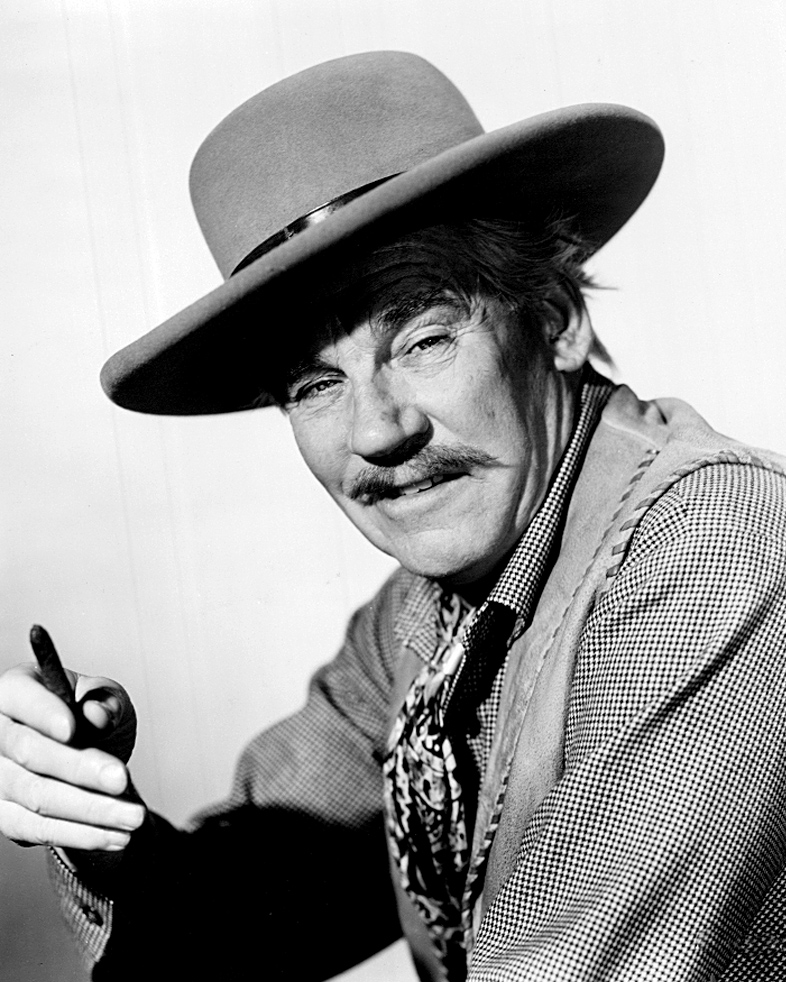
Walter Huston won for The Treasure of the Sierra Madre (1947)

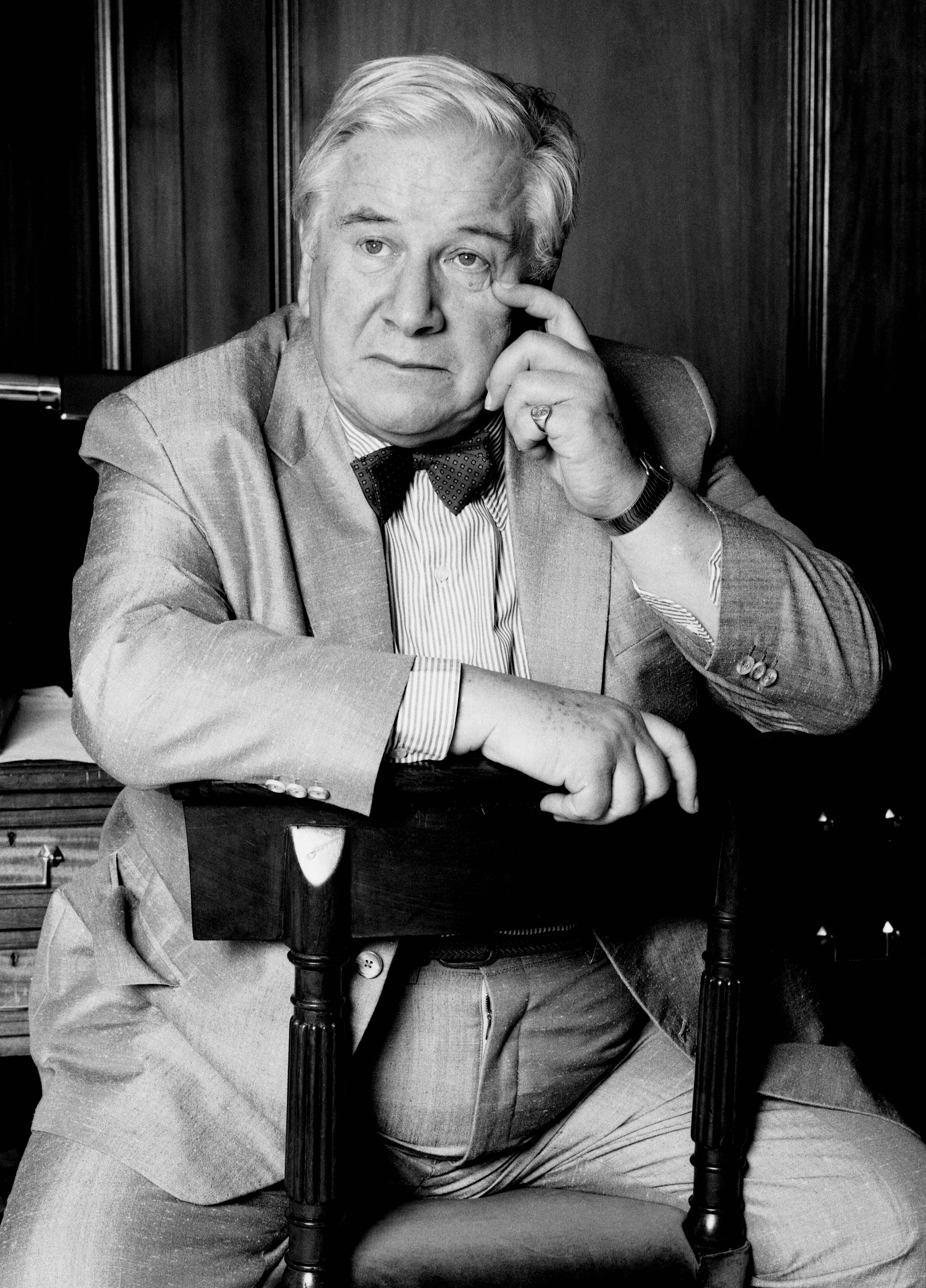
Peter Ustinov won for Quo Vadis (1951)

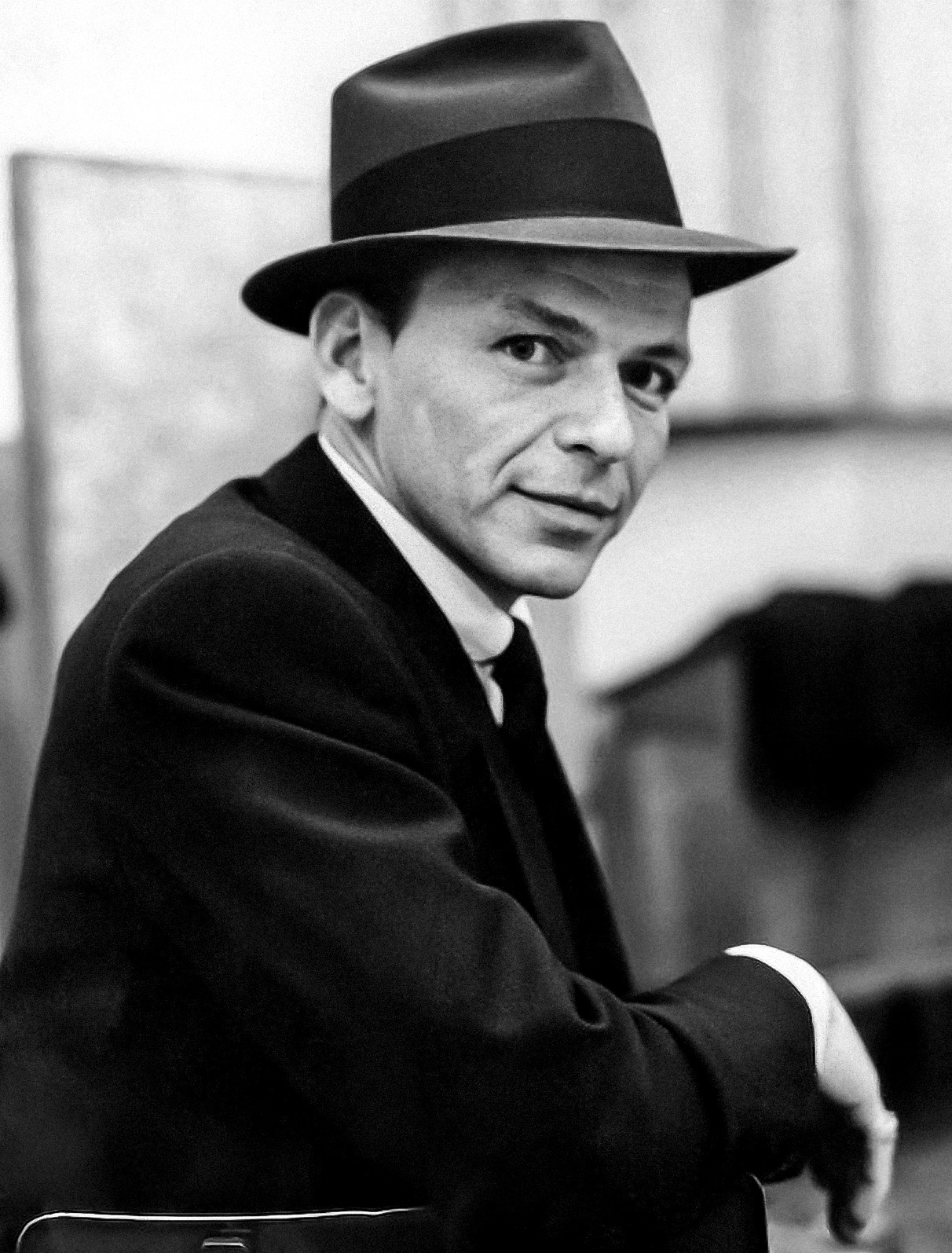
Frank Sinatra won for From Here to Eternity (1953)

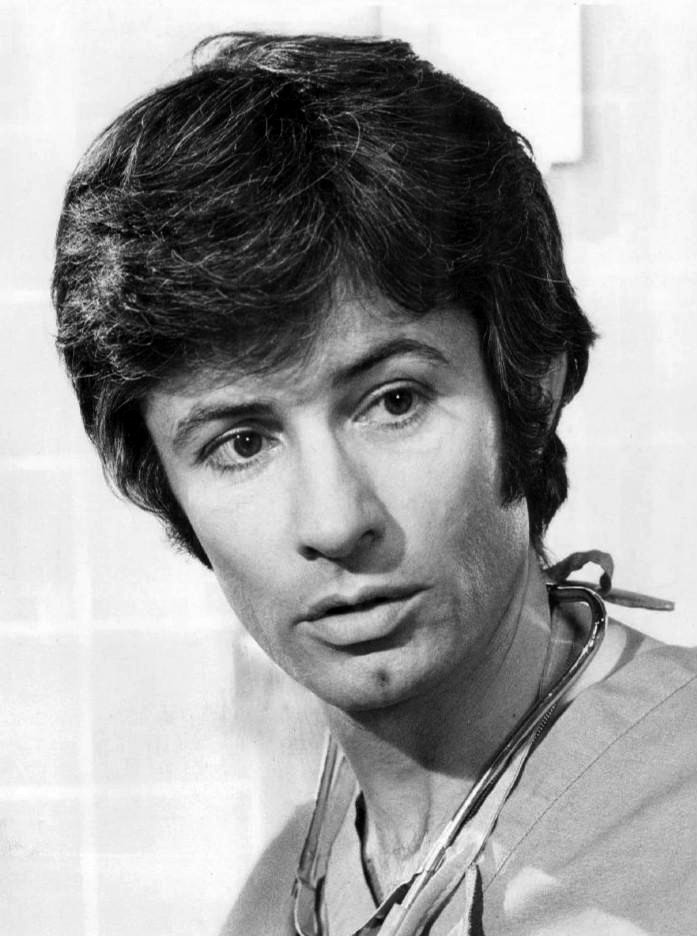
George Chakiris won for West Side Story (1961)

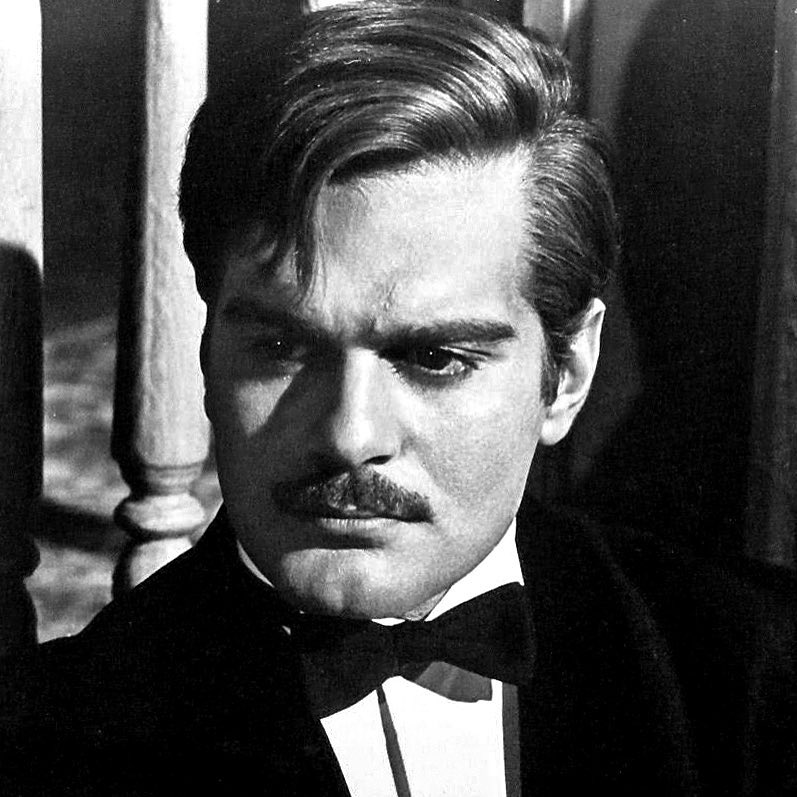
Omar Sharif won for Lawrence of Arabia (1962)

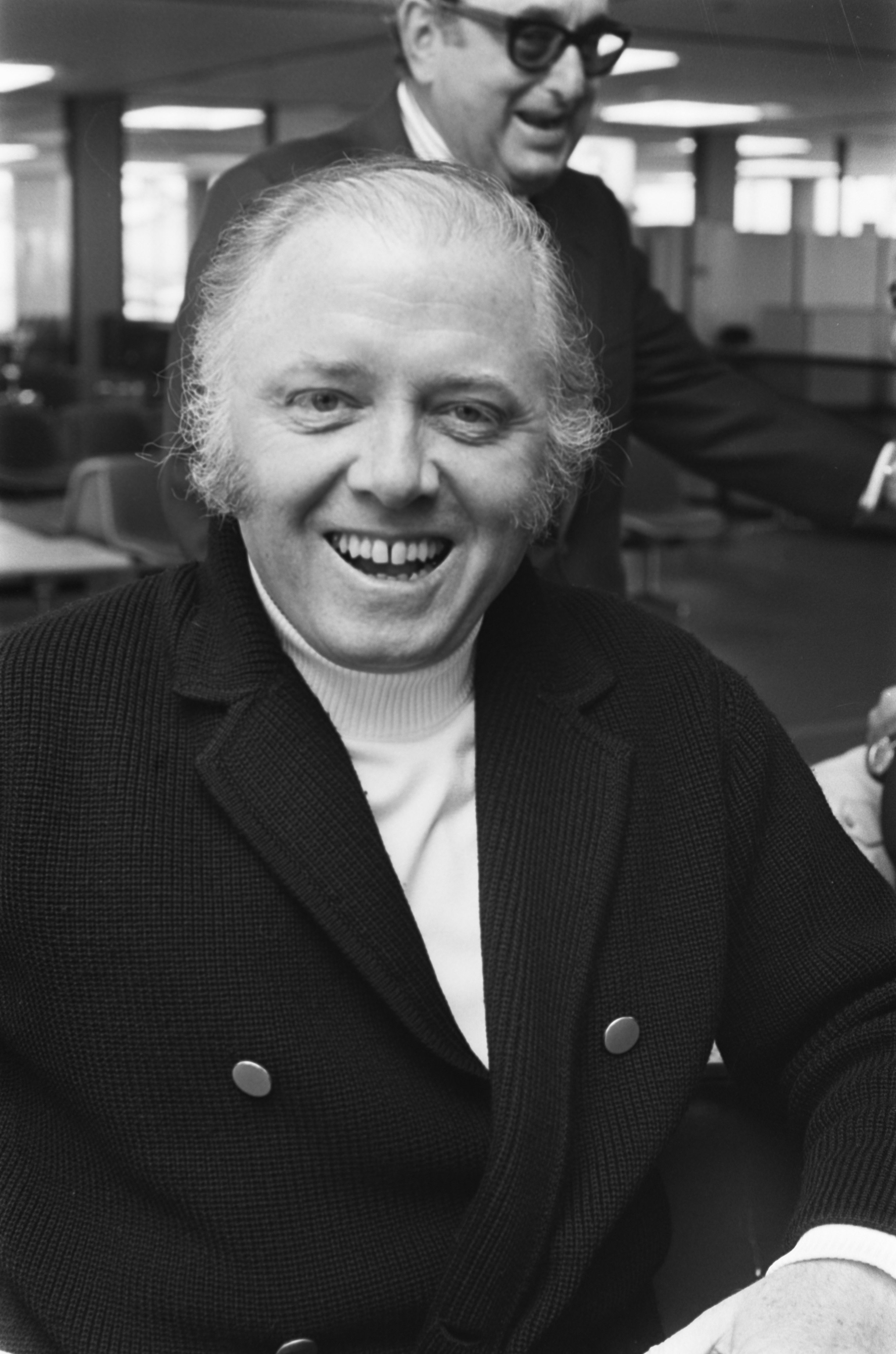
Richard Attenborough won twice for The Sand Pebbles (1966) and Doctor Dolittle (1967)

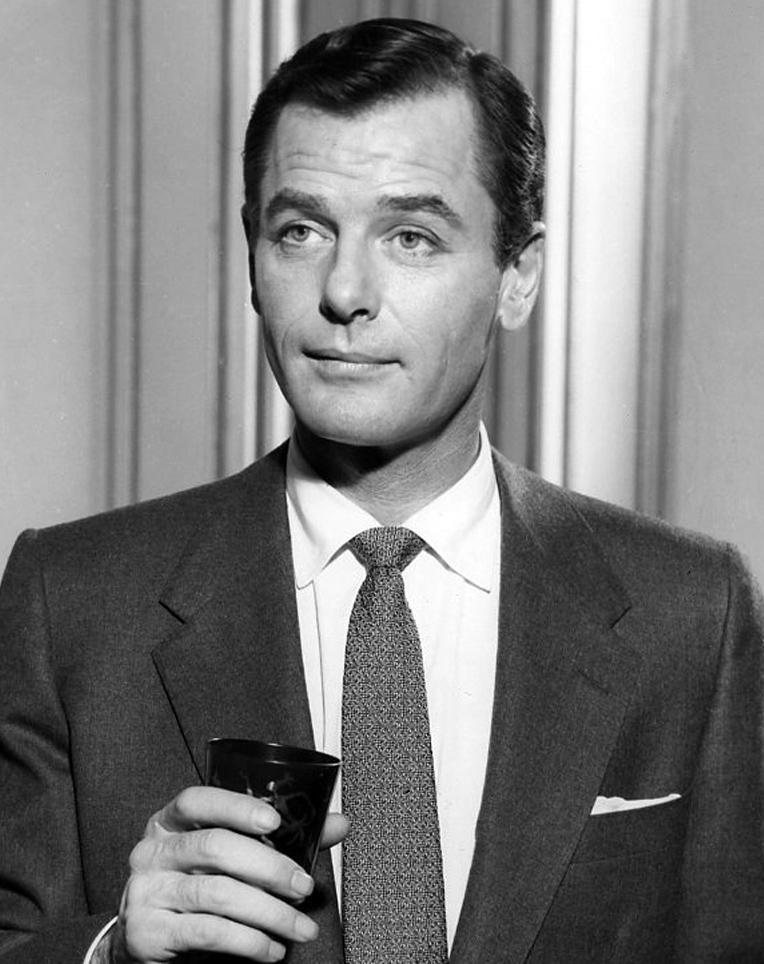
Gig Young won for They Shoot Horses, Don't They? (1969)

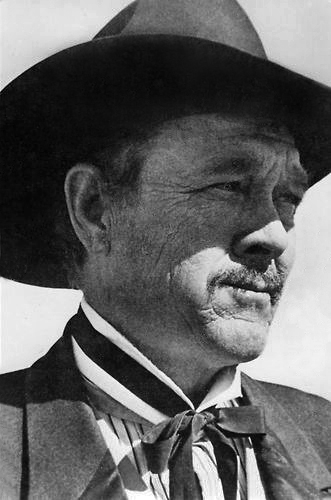
Ben Johnson won for The Last Picture Show (1971)

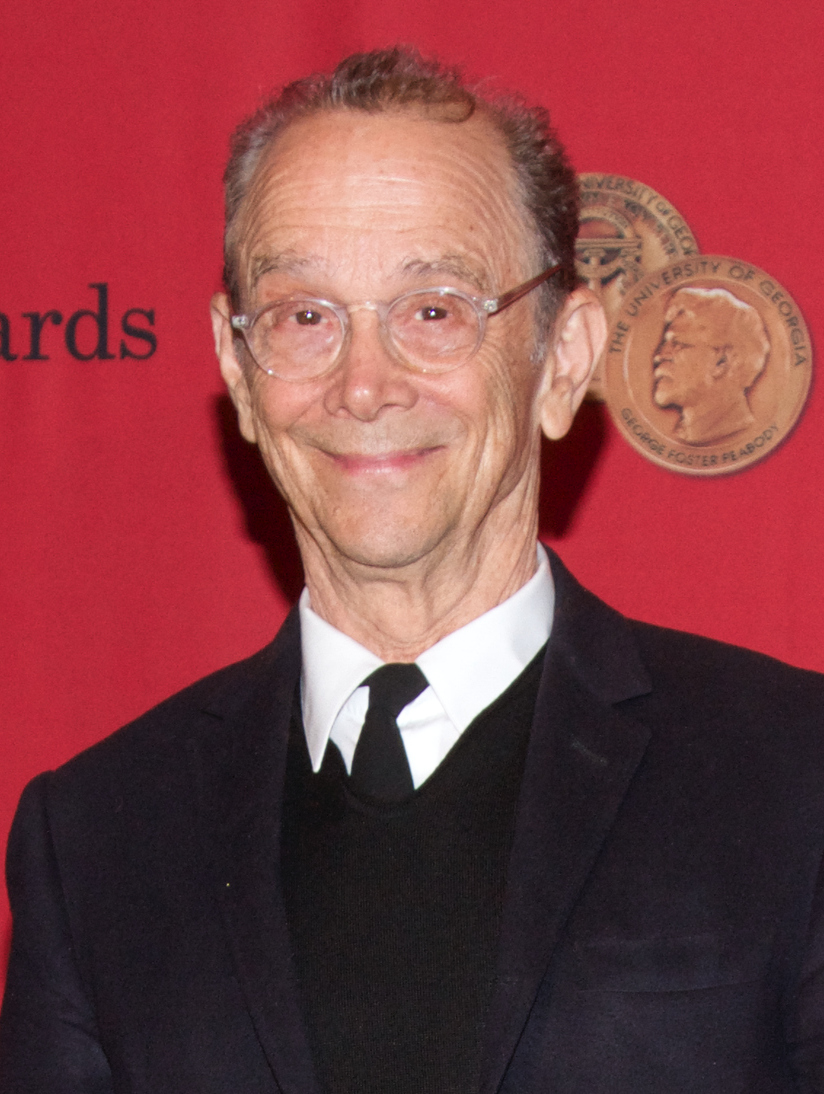
Joel Grey won for Cabaret (1972)

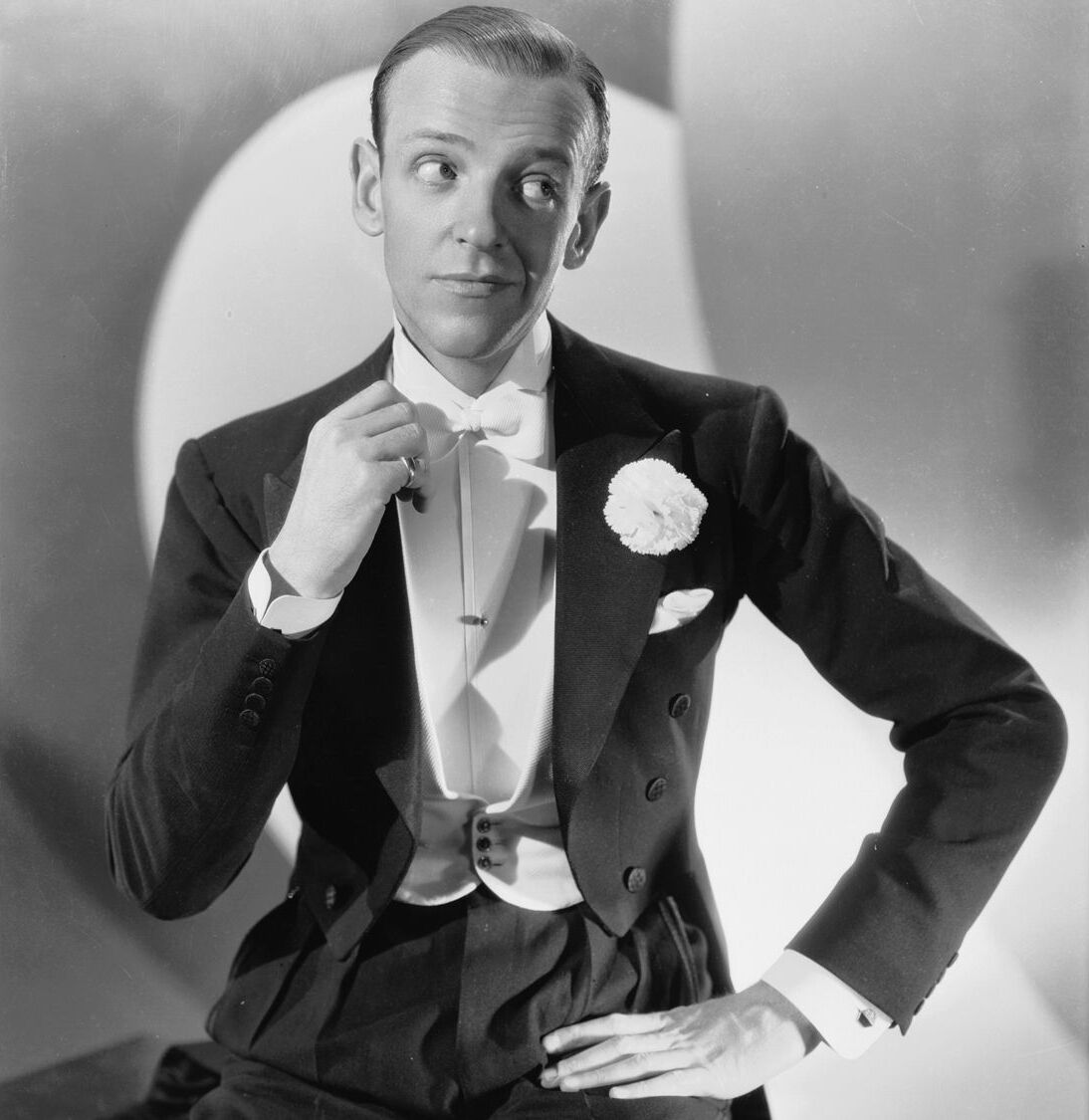
Fred Astaire won for The Towering Inferno (1974)

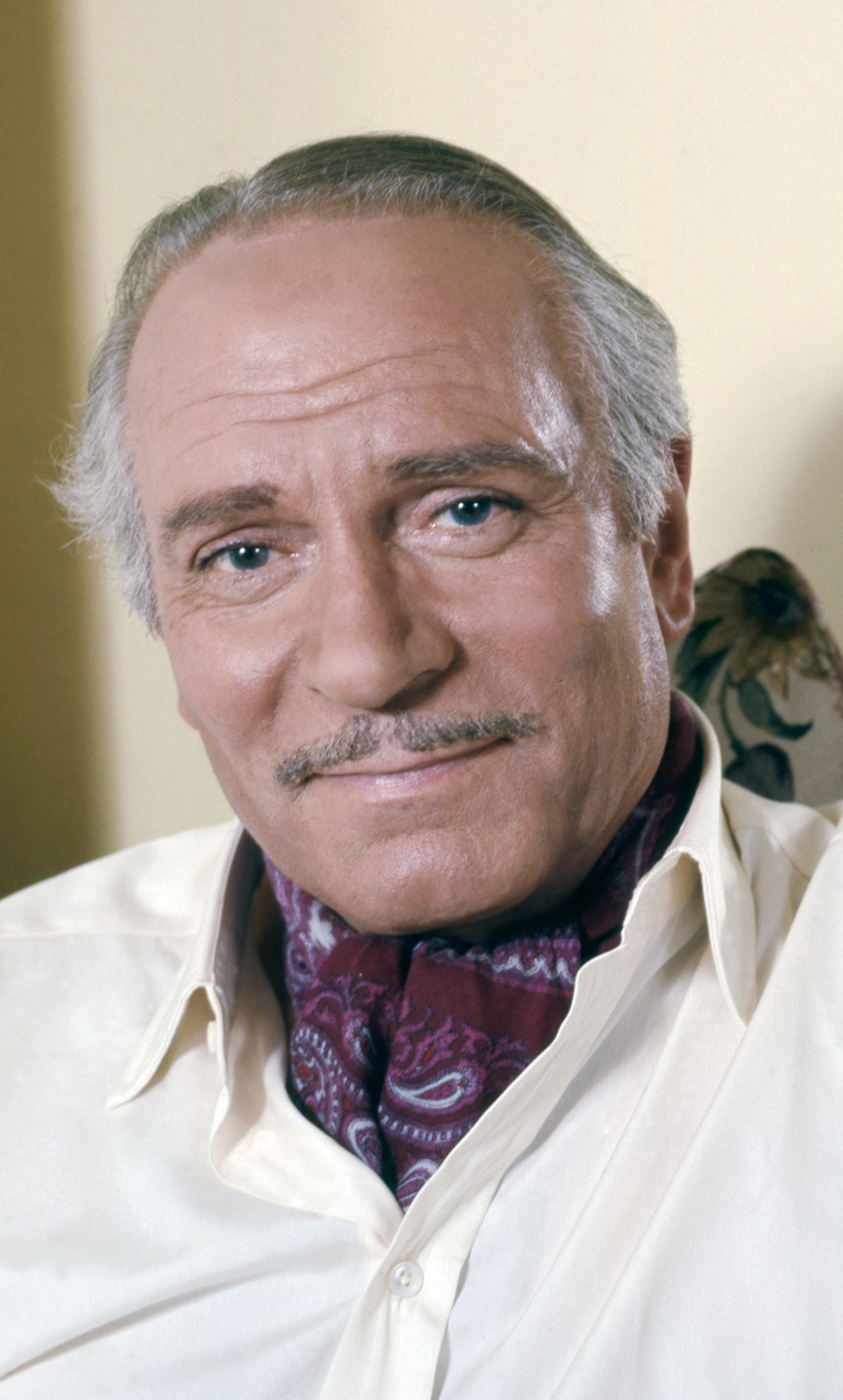
Laurence Olivier won for Marathon Man (1976)

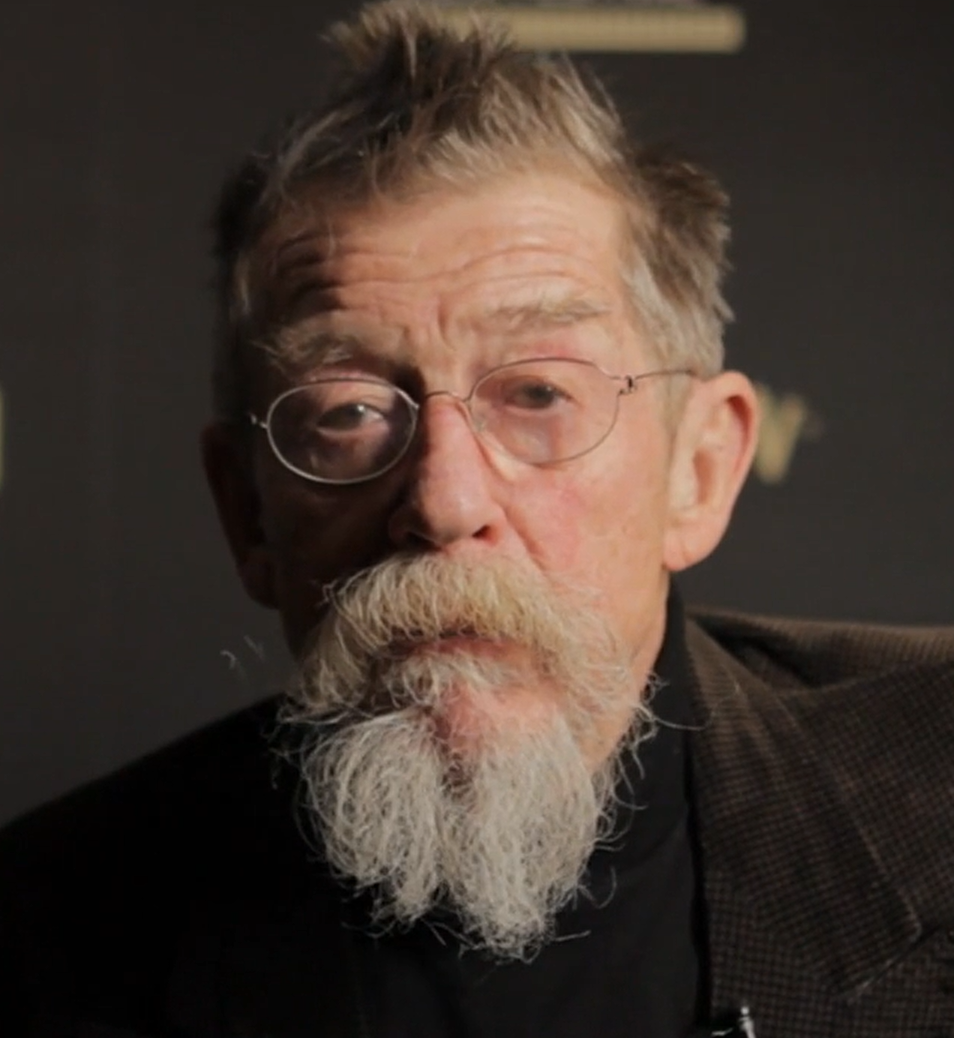
John Hurt won for Midnight Express (1978)

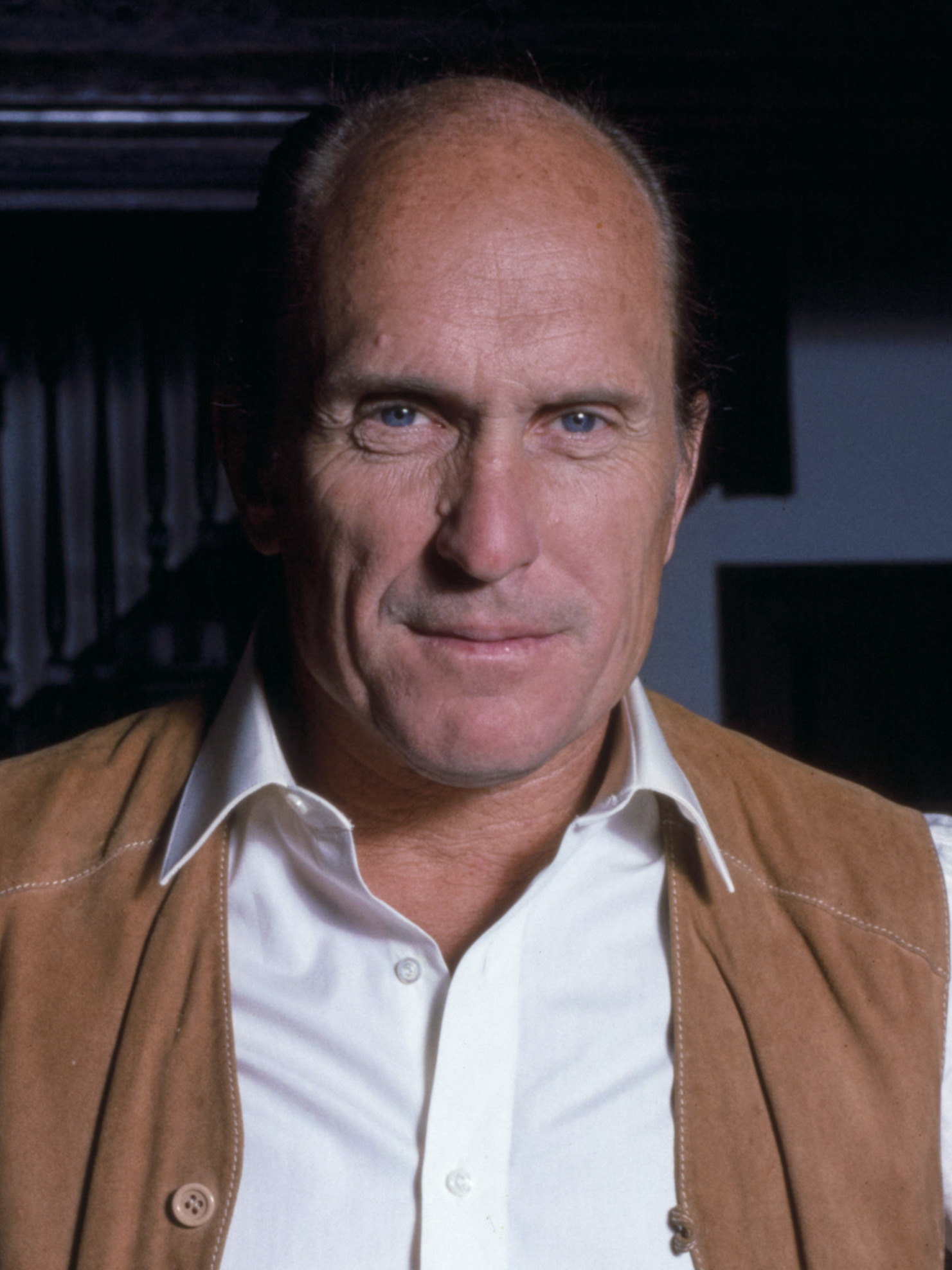
Robert Duvall won for Apocalypse Now (1979)

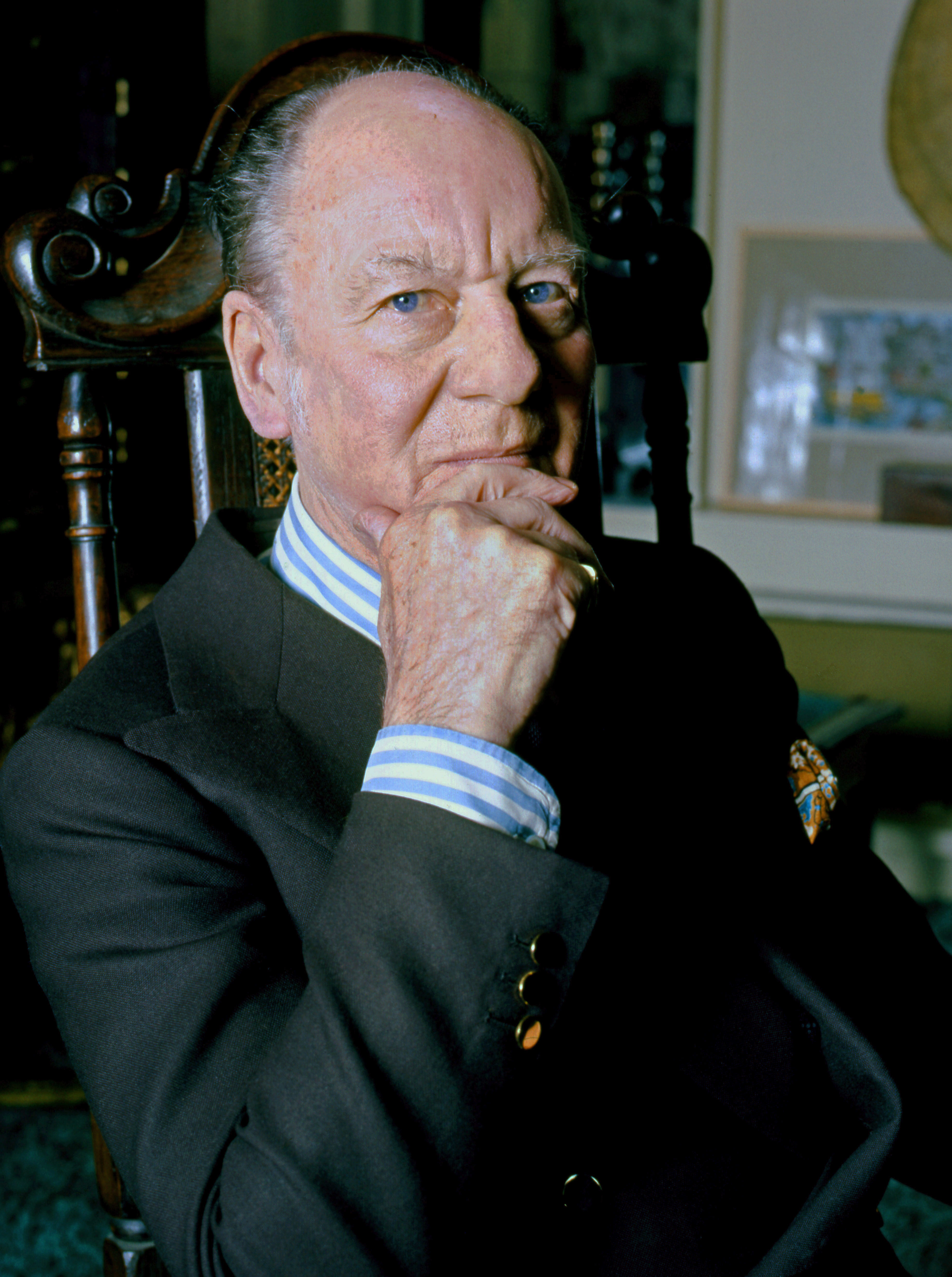
John Gielgud won for Arthur (1981)

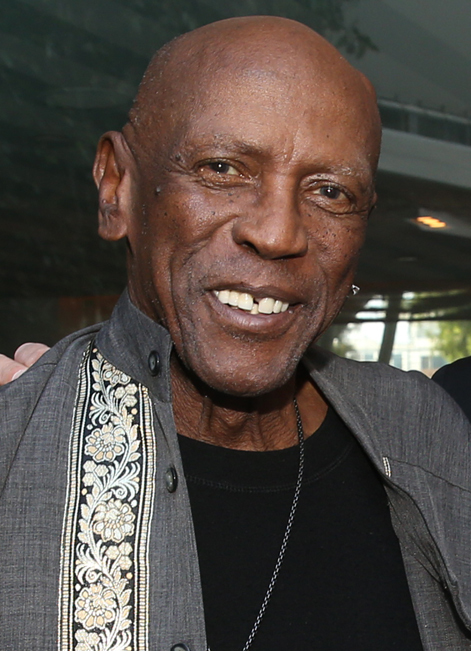
Louis Gossett Jr. won for An Officer and a Gentleman (1982)

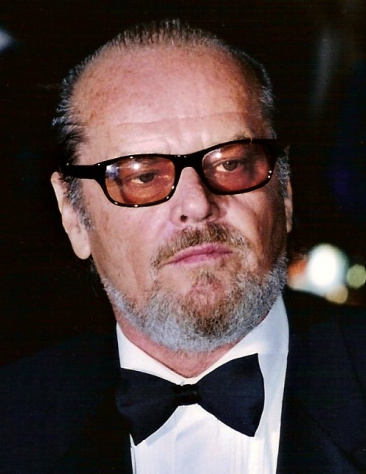
Jack Nicholson won for Terms of Endearment (1983)

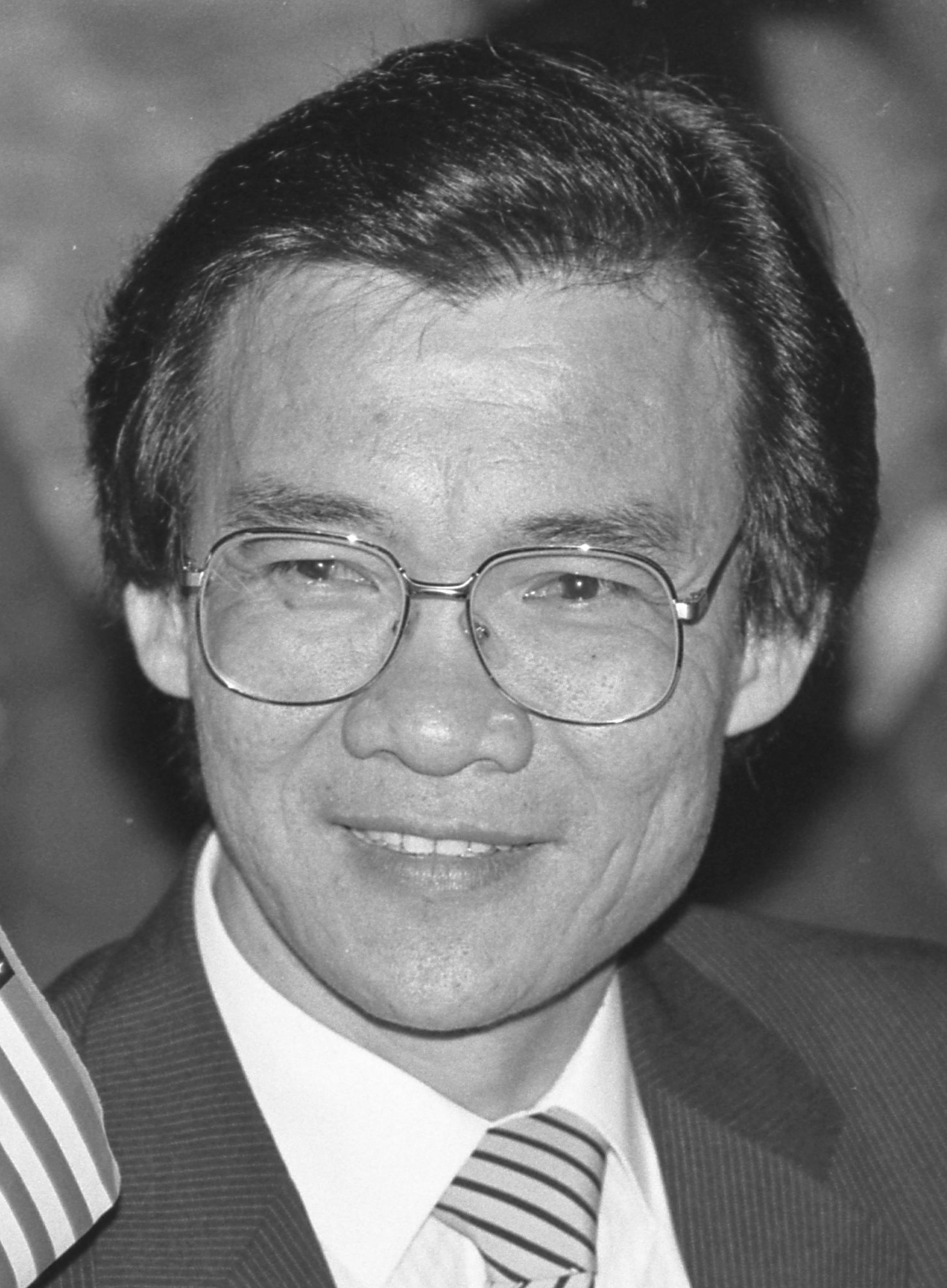
Haing S. Ngor won for The Killing Fields (1984)

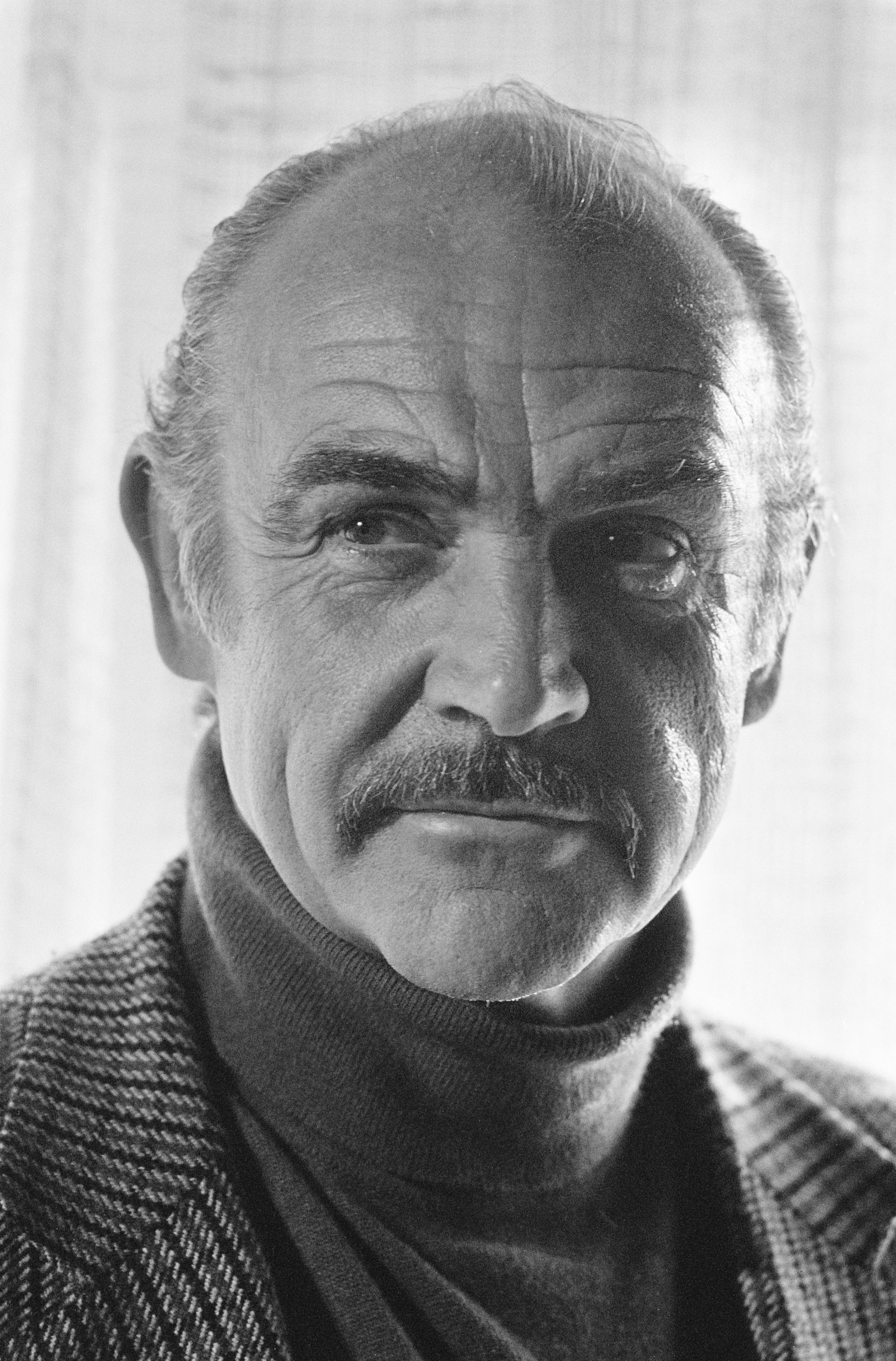
Sean Connery won for The Untouchables (1987)

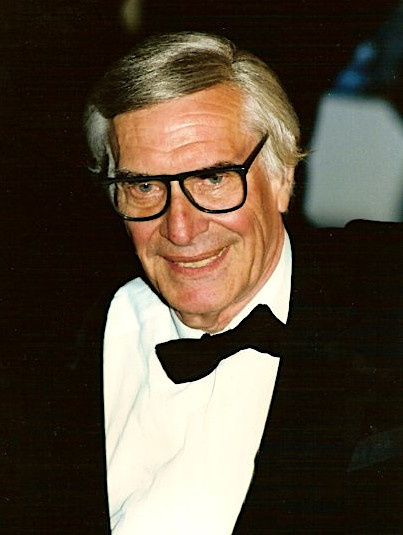
Martin Landau won twice for Tucker: The Man and His Dream (1988) and Ed Wood (1994)

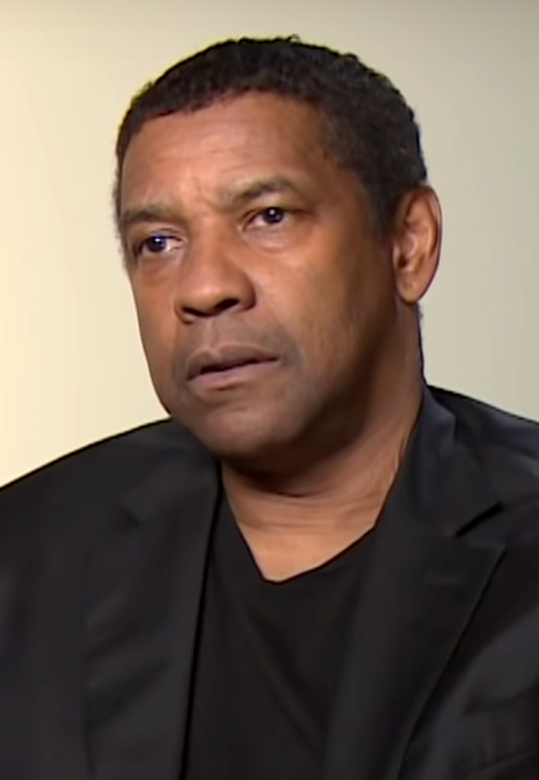
Denzel Washington won for Glory (1989)

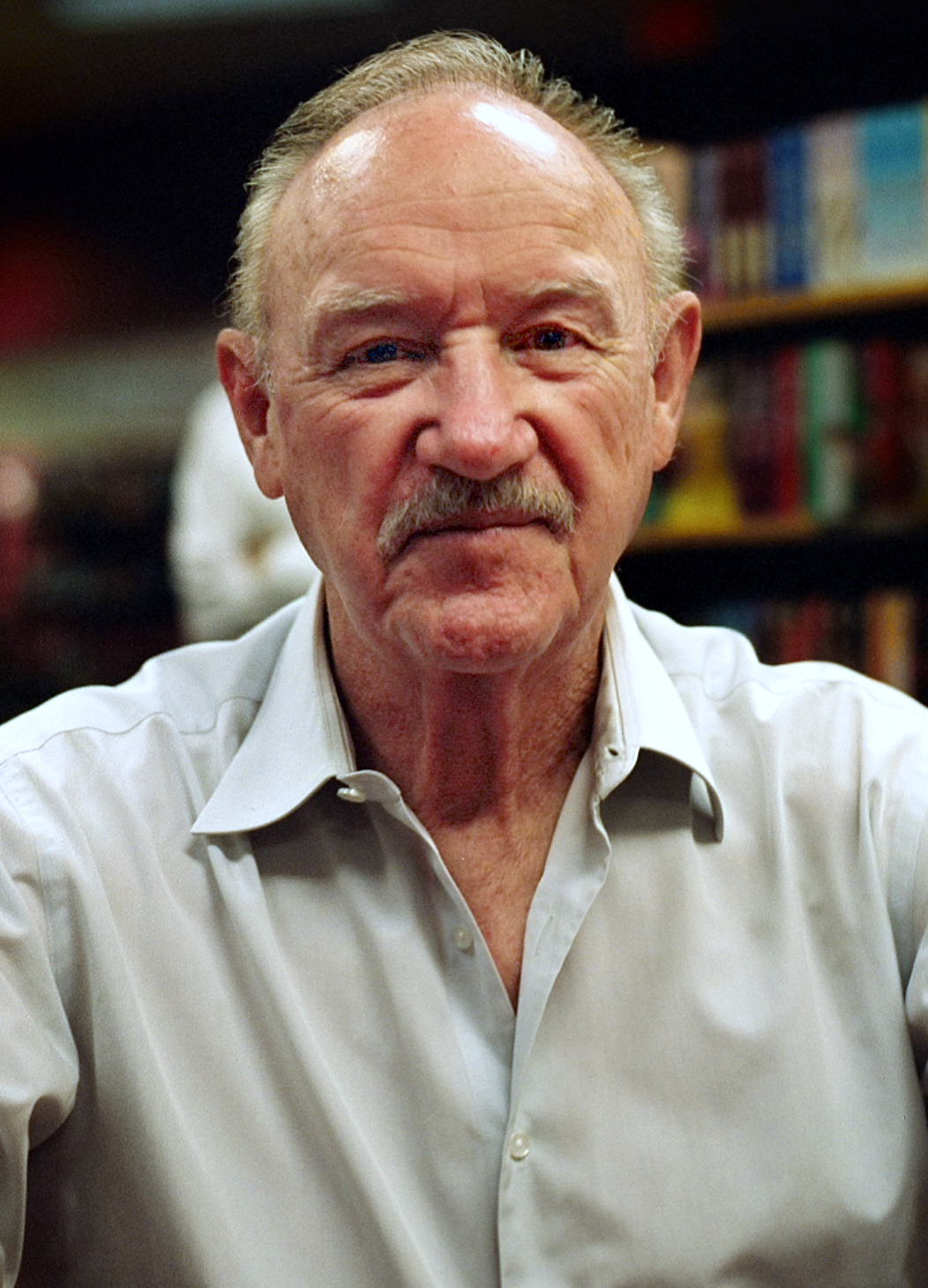
Gene Hackman won for Unforgiven (1992)

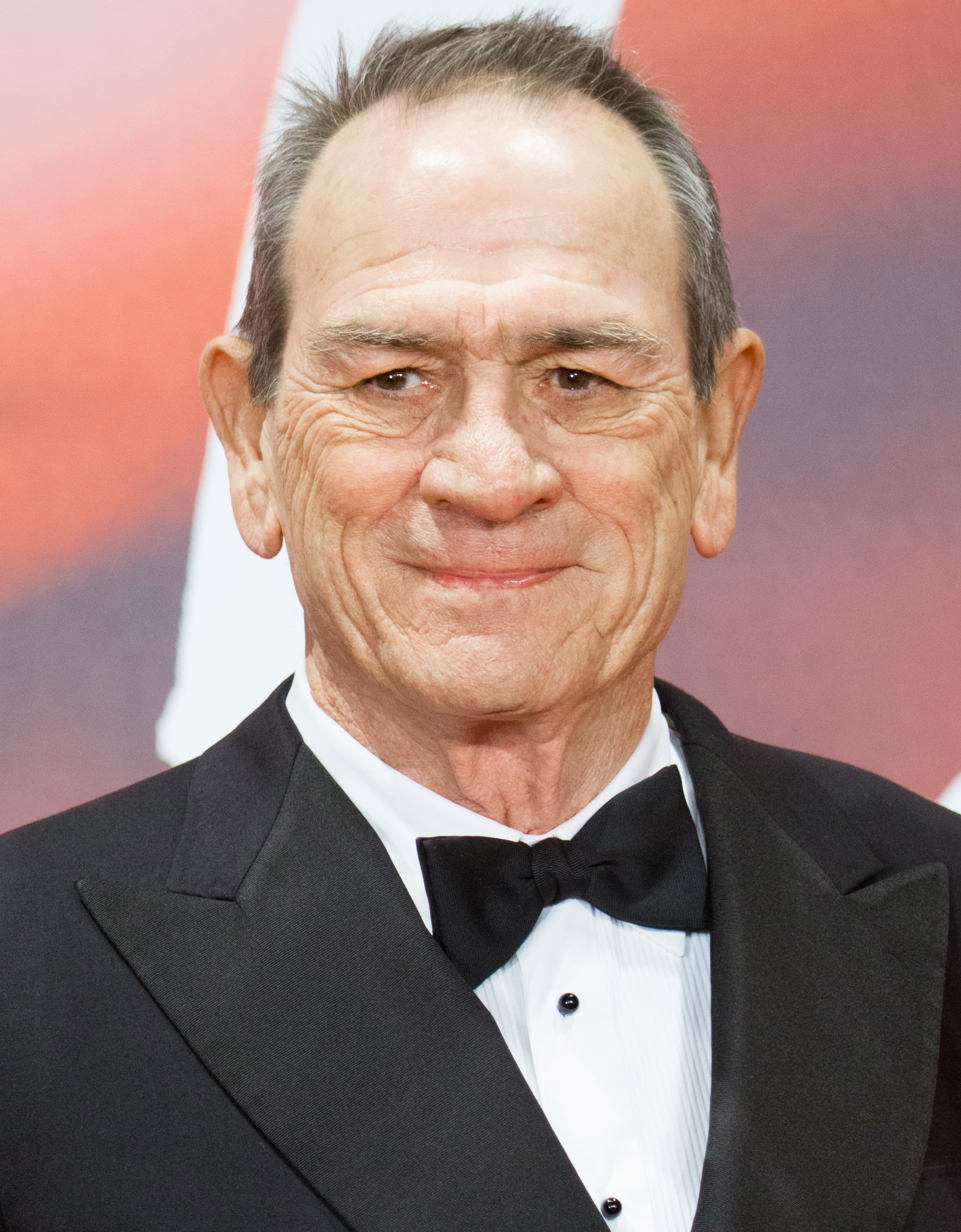
Tommy Lee Jones won for The Fugitive (1993)

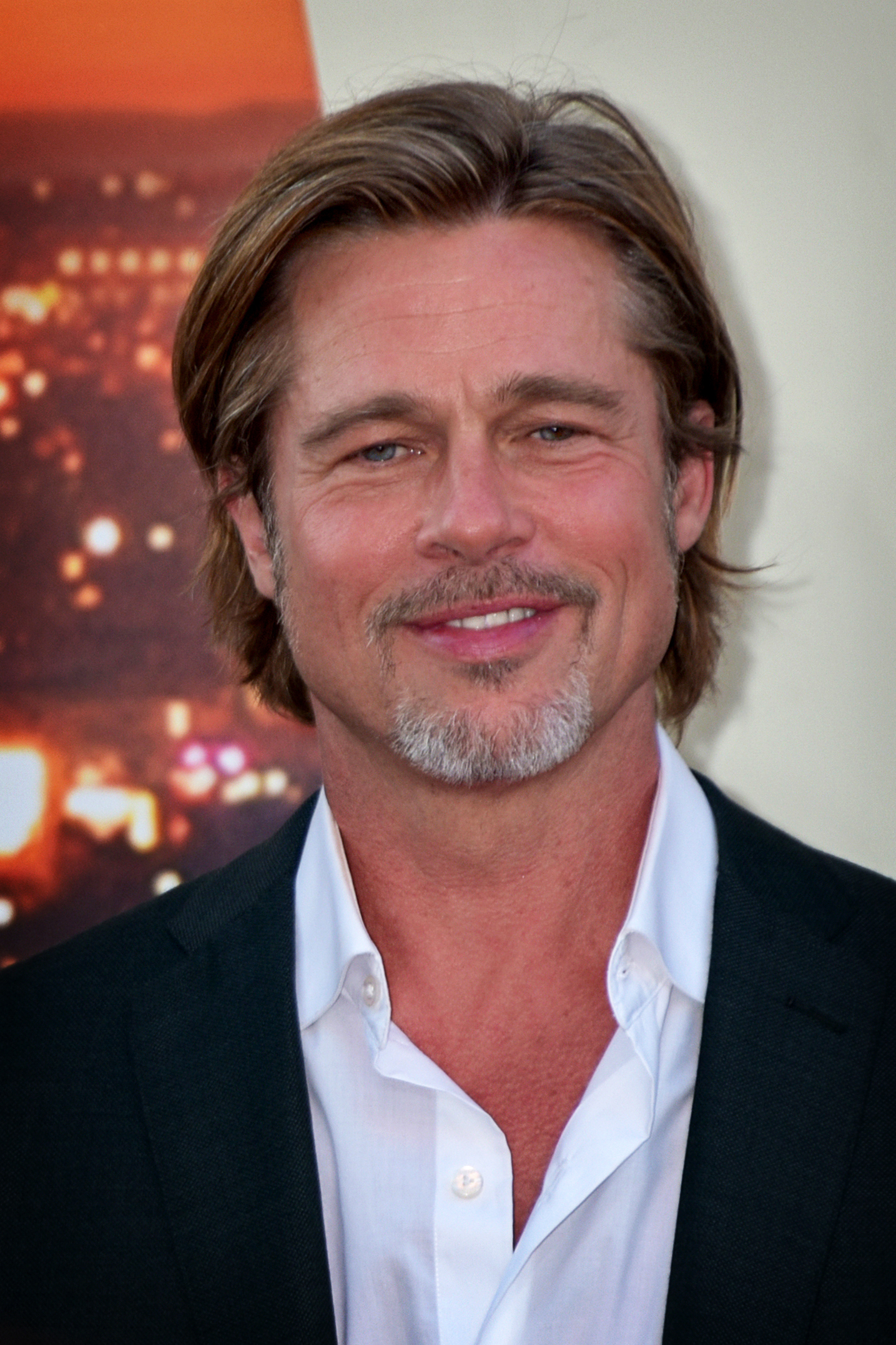
Brad Pitt won twice 12 Monkeys (1995) and Once Upon a Time in Hollywood (2019)

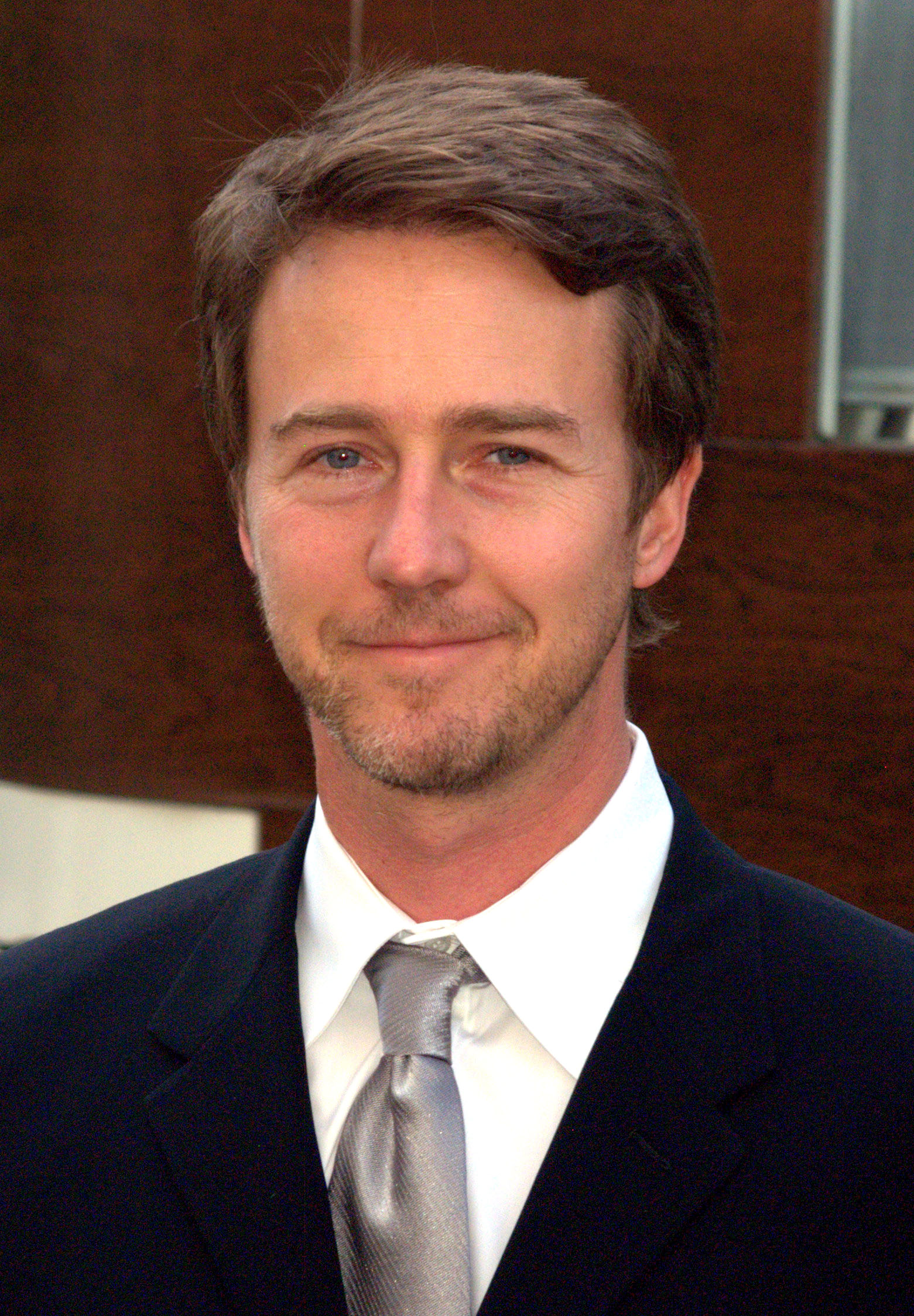
Edward Norton for Primal Fear (1996)

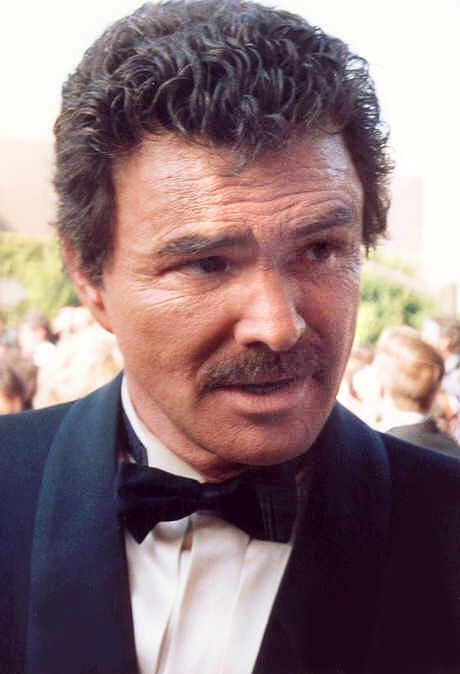
Burt Reynolds won for Boogie Nights (1997)

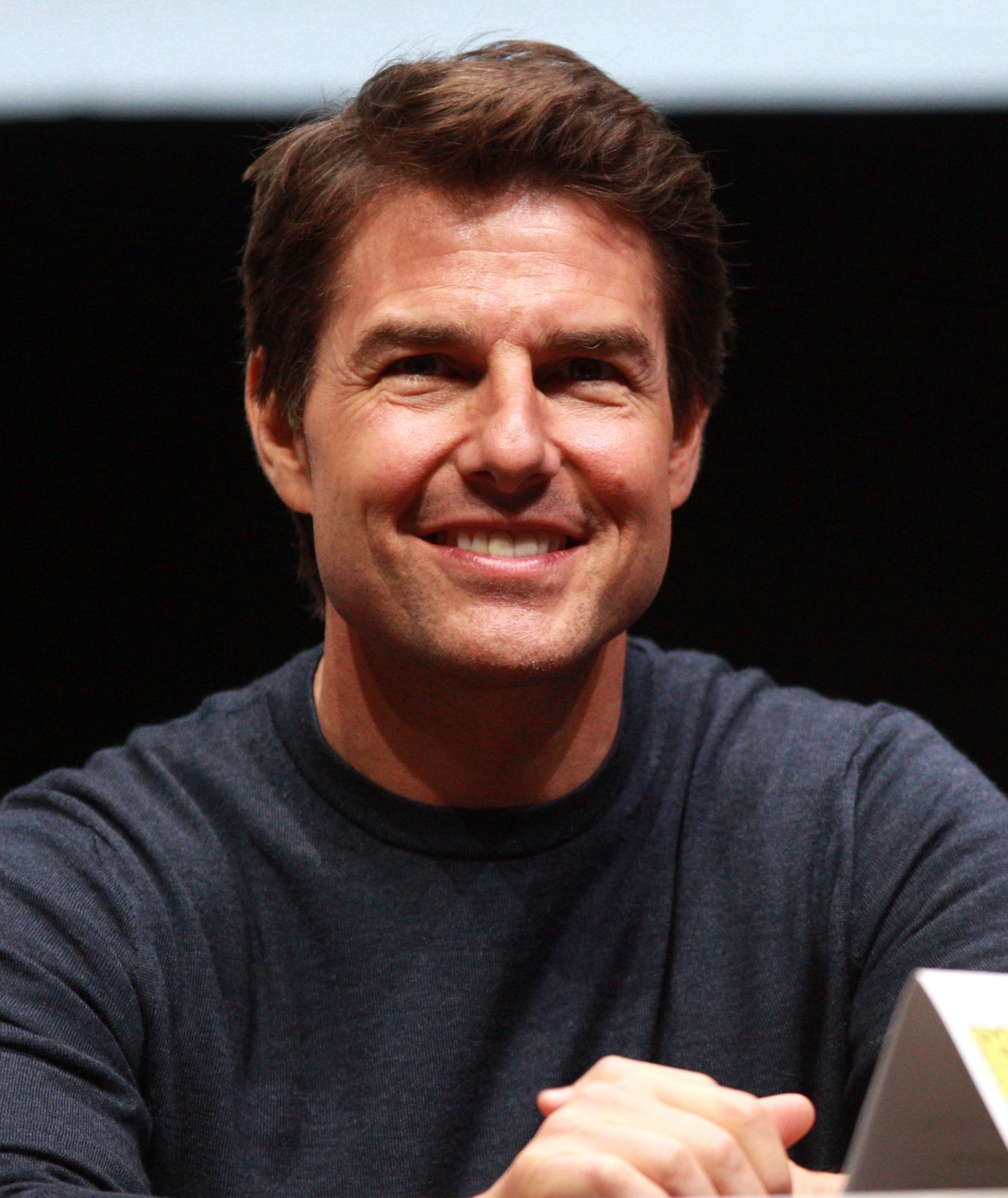
Tom Cruise won Magnolia (1999)

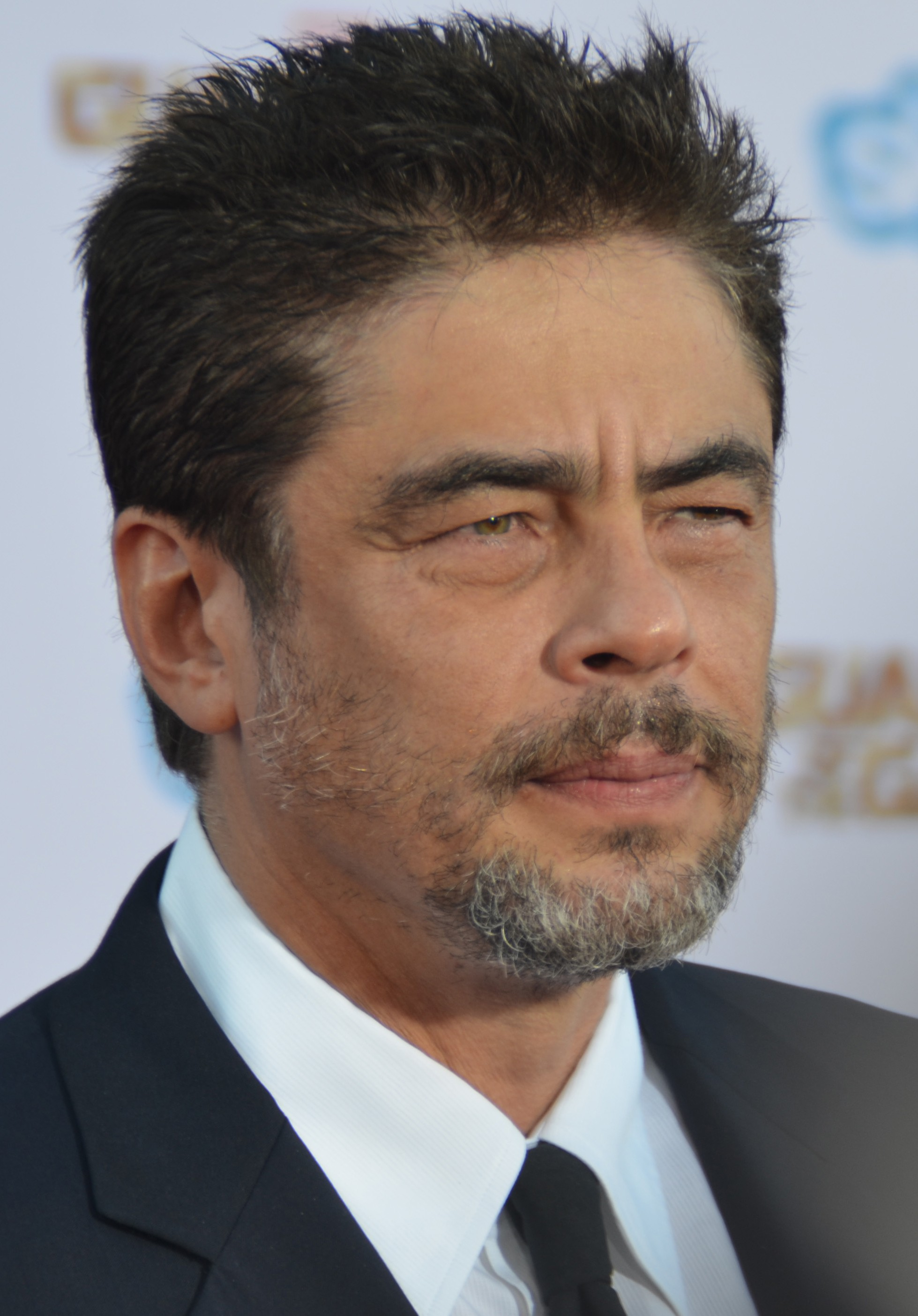
Benicio Del Toro won for Traffic (2000)

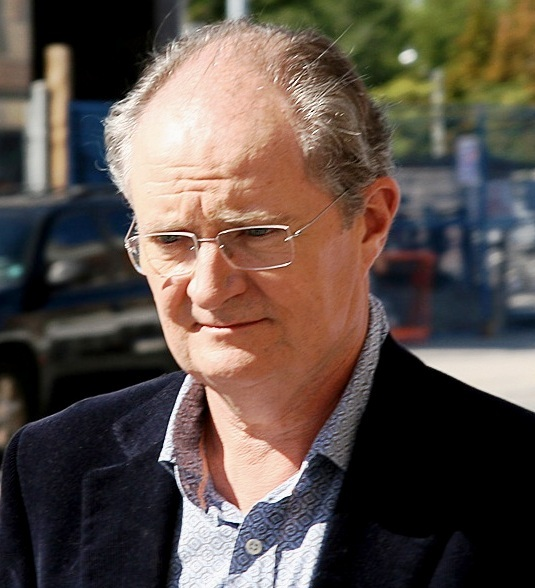
Jim Broadbent won for Iris (2001)

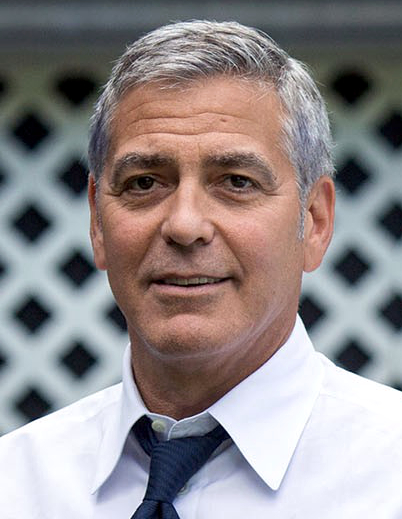
George Clooney won for Syriana (2005)

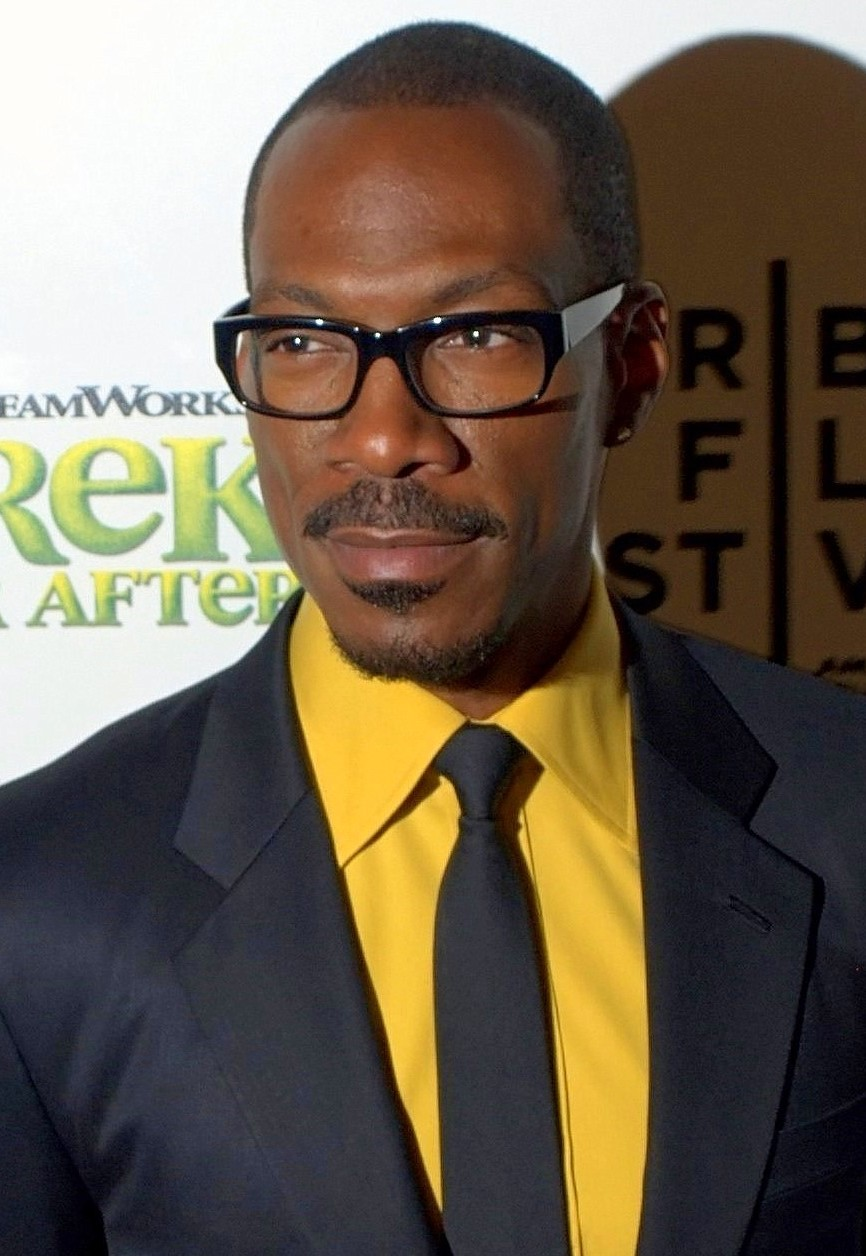
Eddie Murphy won for Dreamgirls (2006)

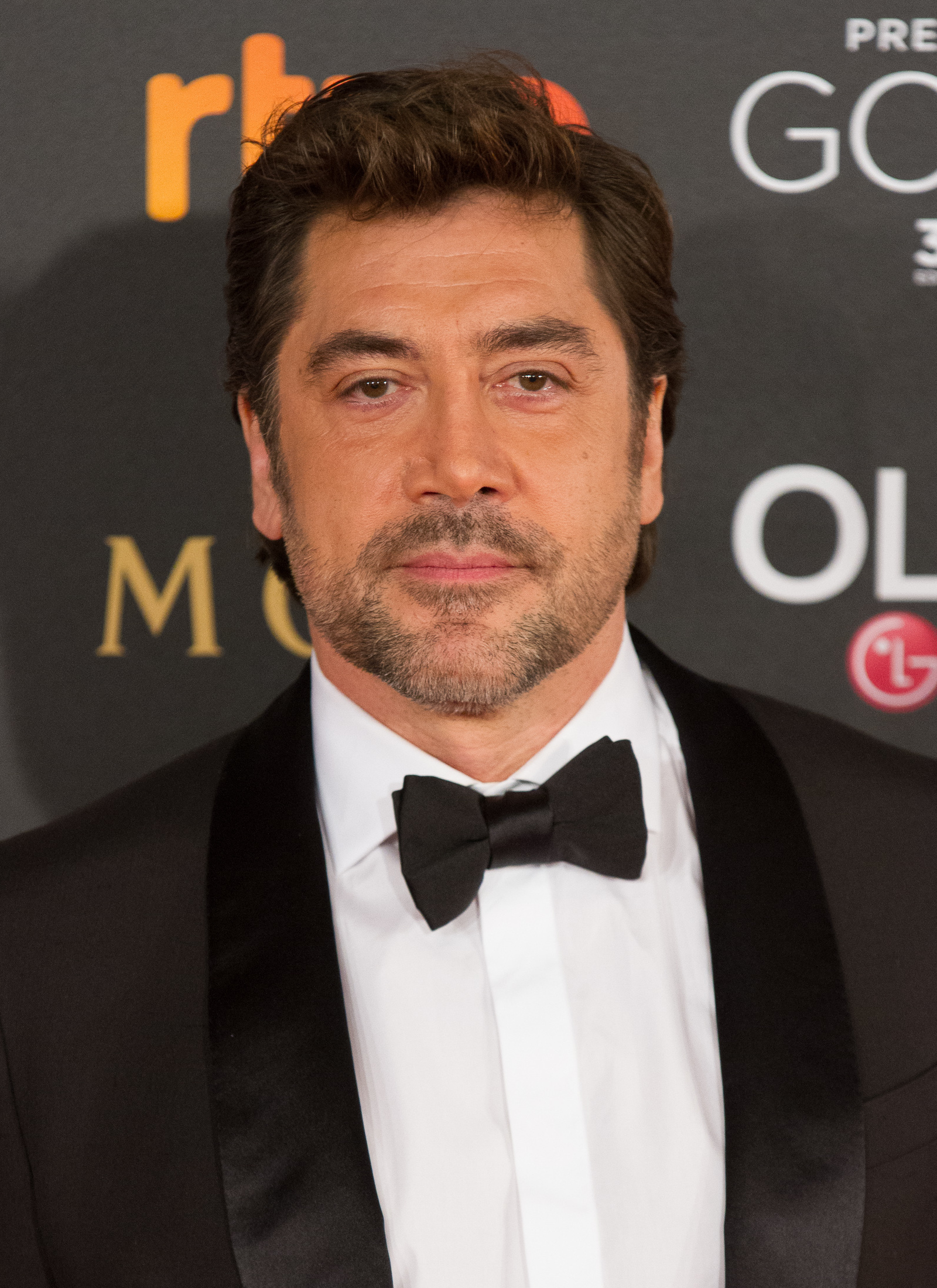
Javier Bardem for No Country for Old Men (2007)

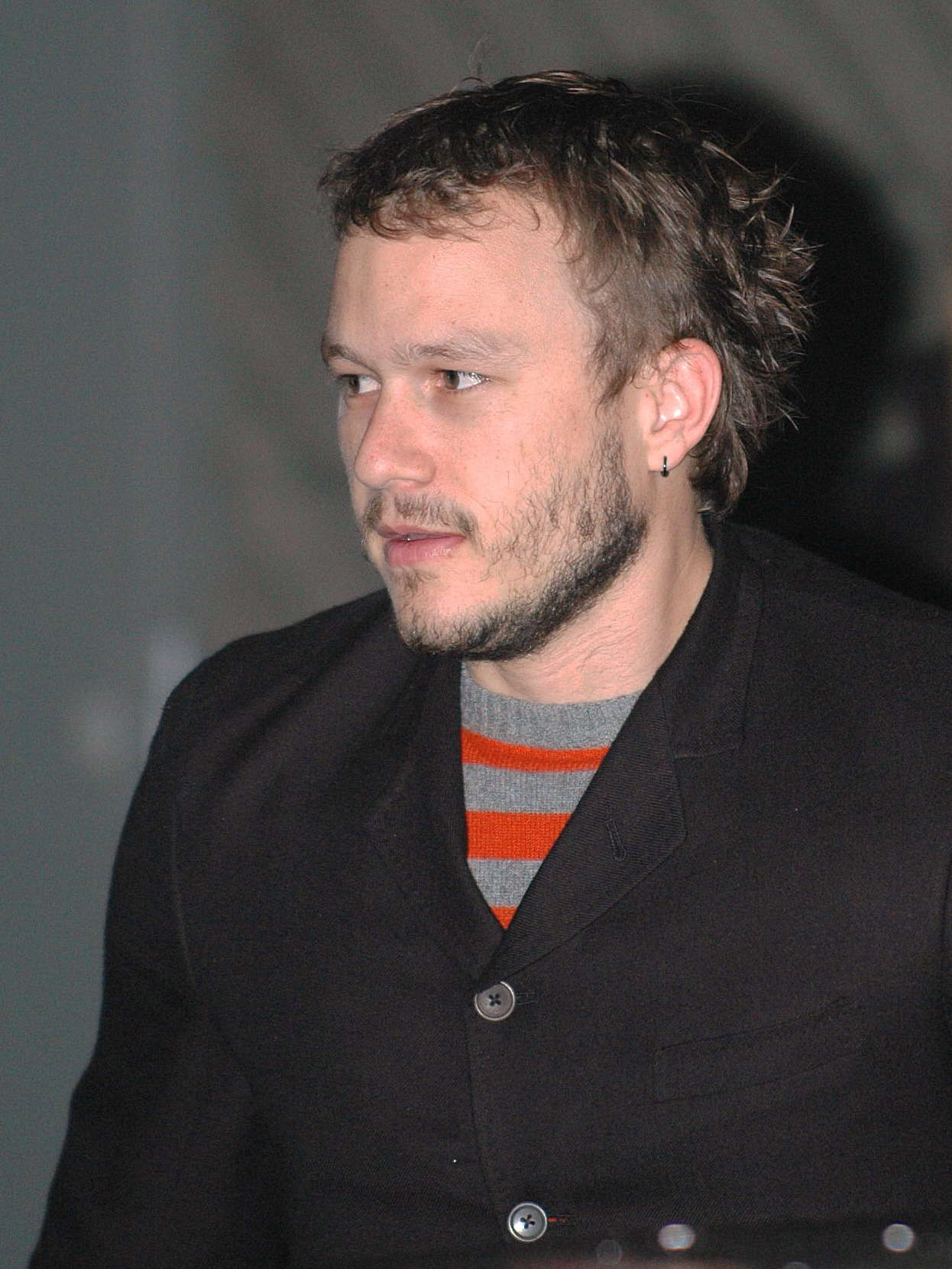
Heath Ledger won for The Dark Knight (2008)

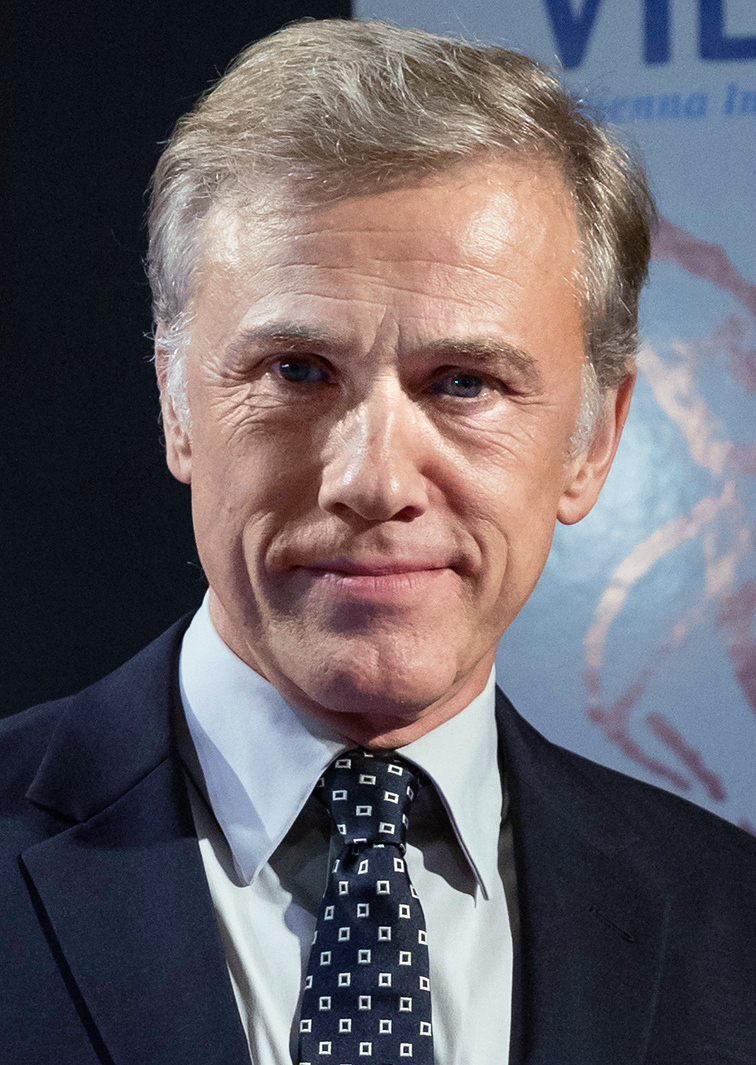
Christoph Waltz won twice for Inglorious Basterds (2009) and Django Unchained (2013)

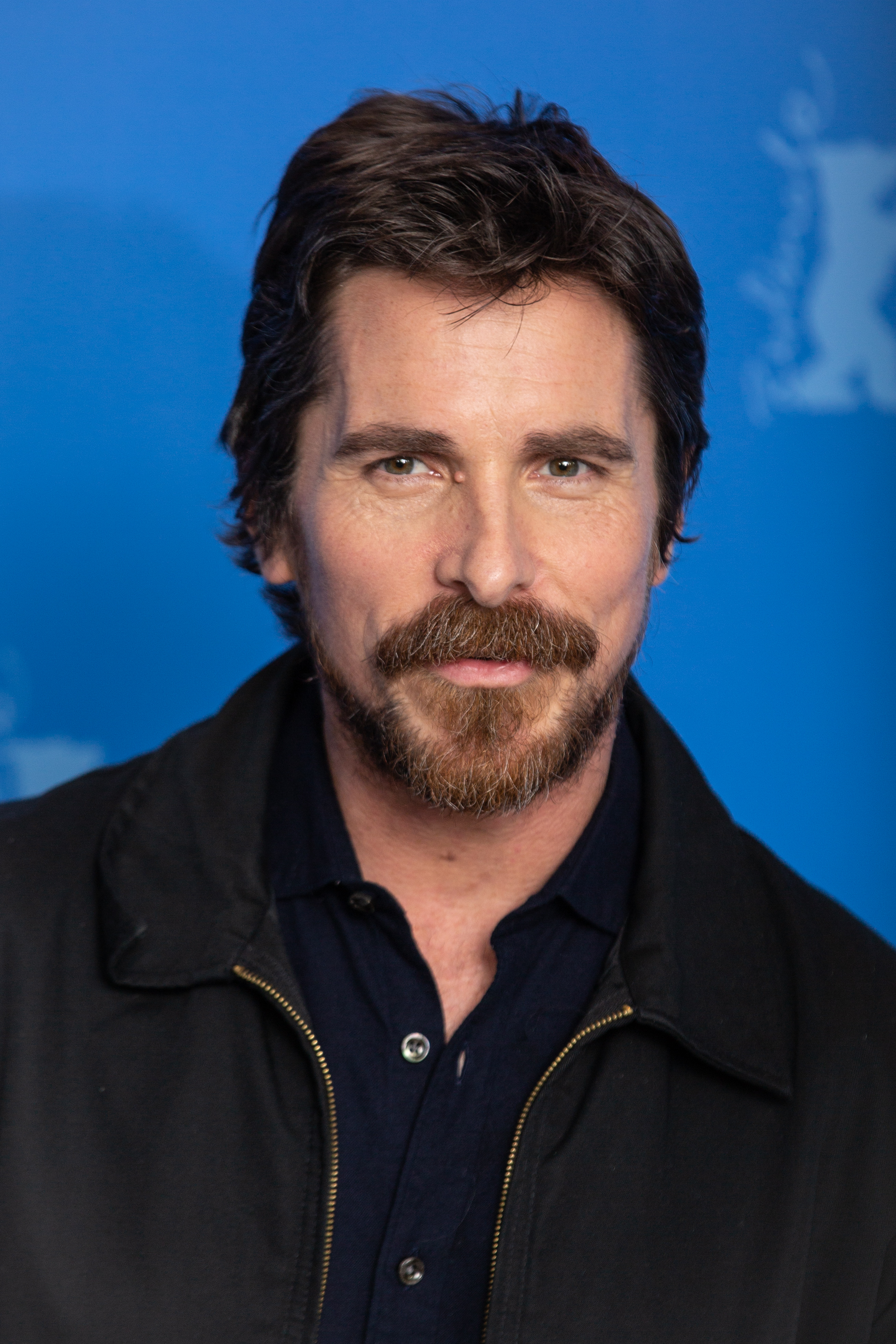
Christian Bale won for The Fighter (2010)

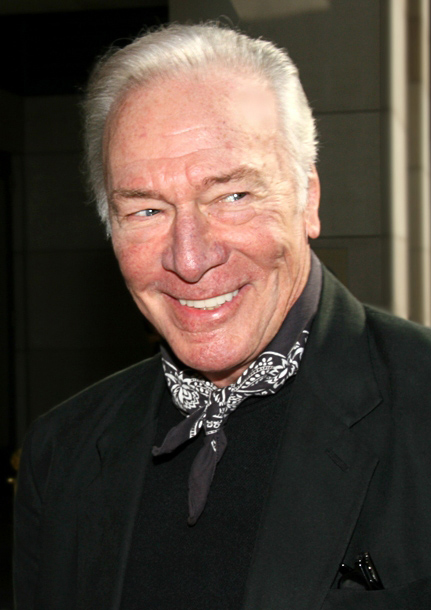
Christopher Plummer won for Beginners (2011)

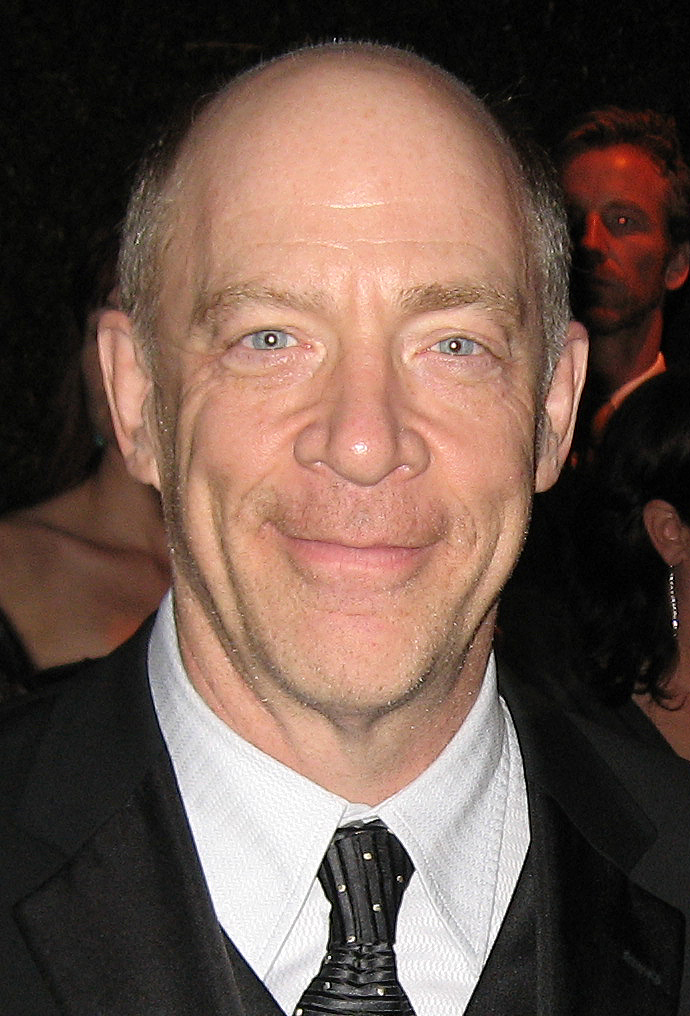
J.K. Simmons won for Whiplash (2014)

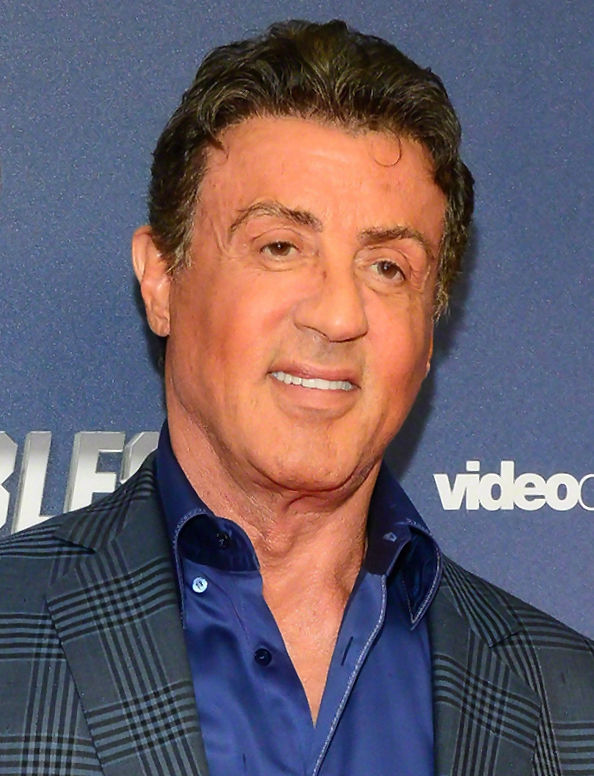
Sylvester Stallone won for Creed (2015)

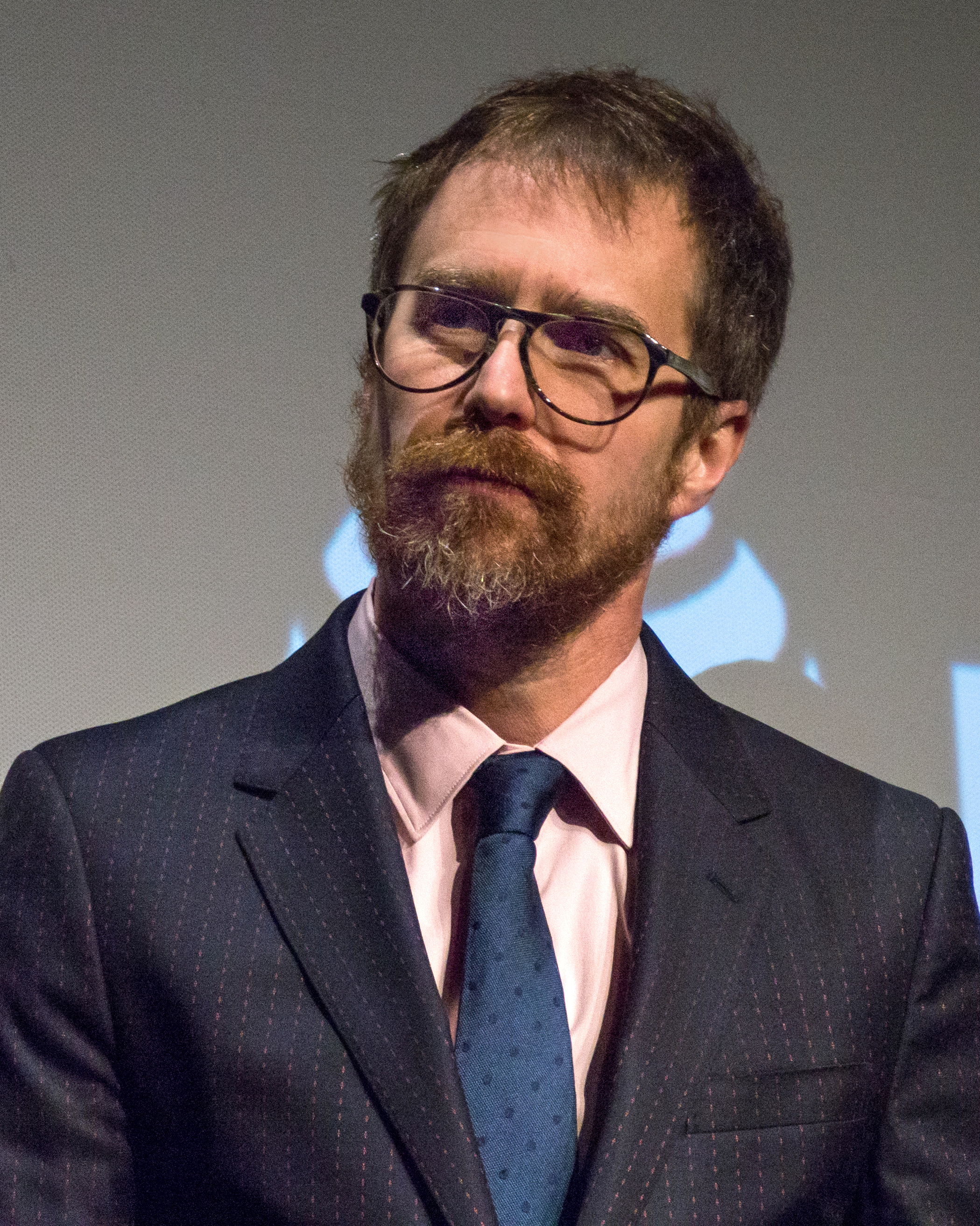
Sam Rockwell won for Three Billboards Outside Ebbing, Missouri (2017)

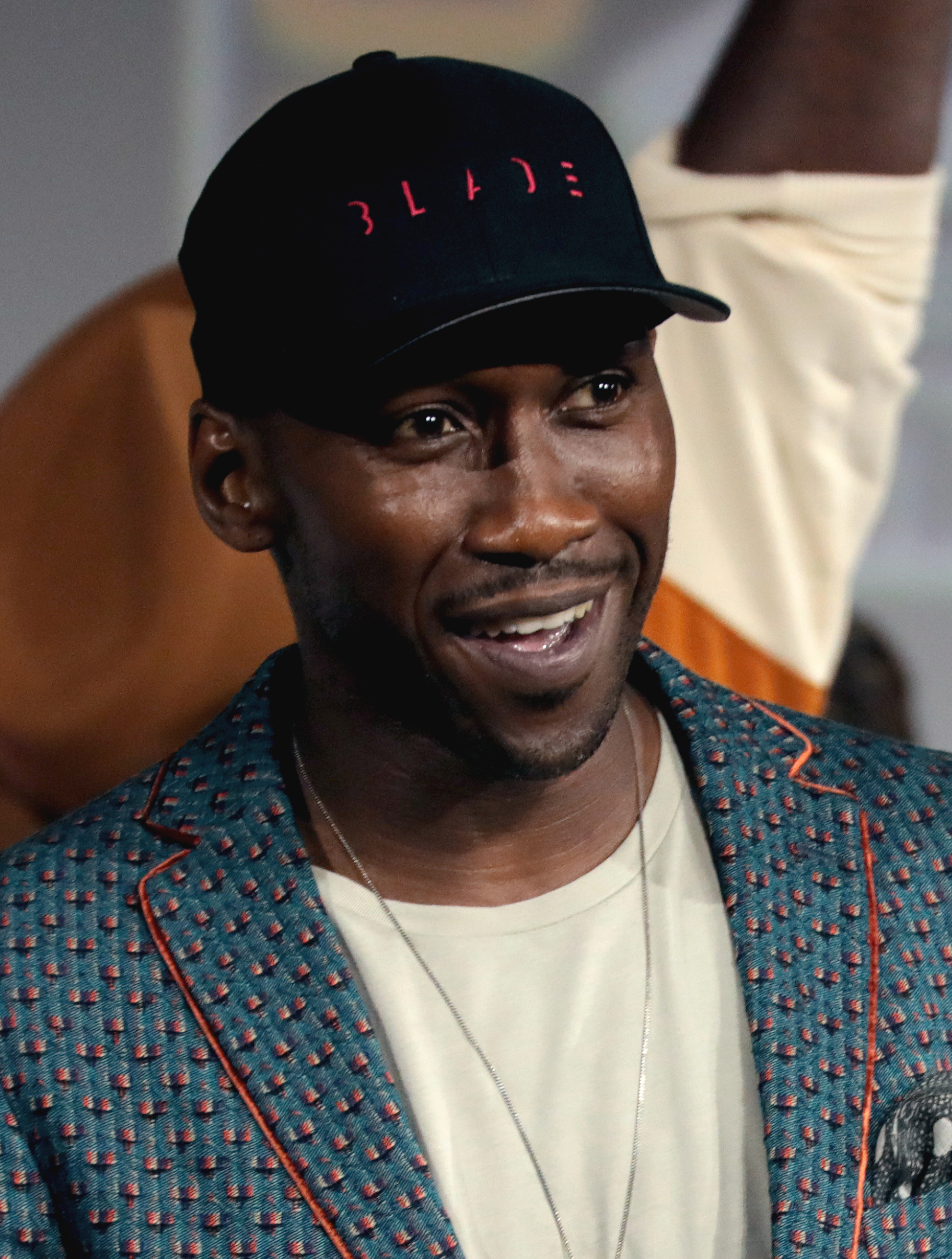
Mahershala Ali won for Green Book (2018)

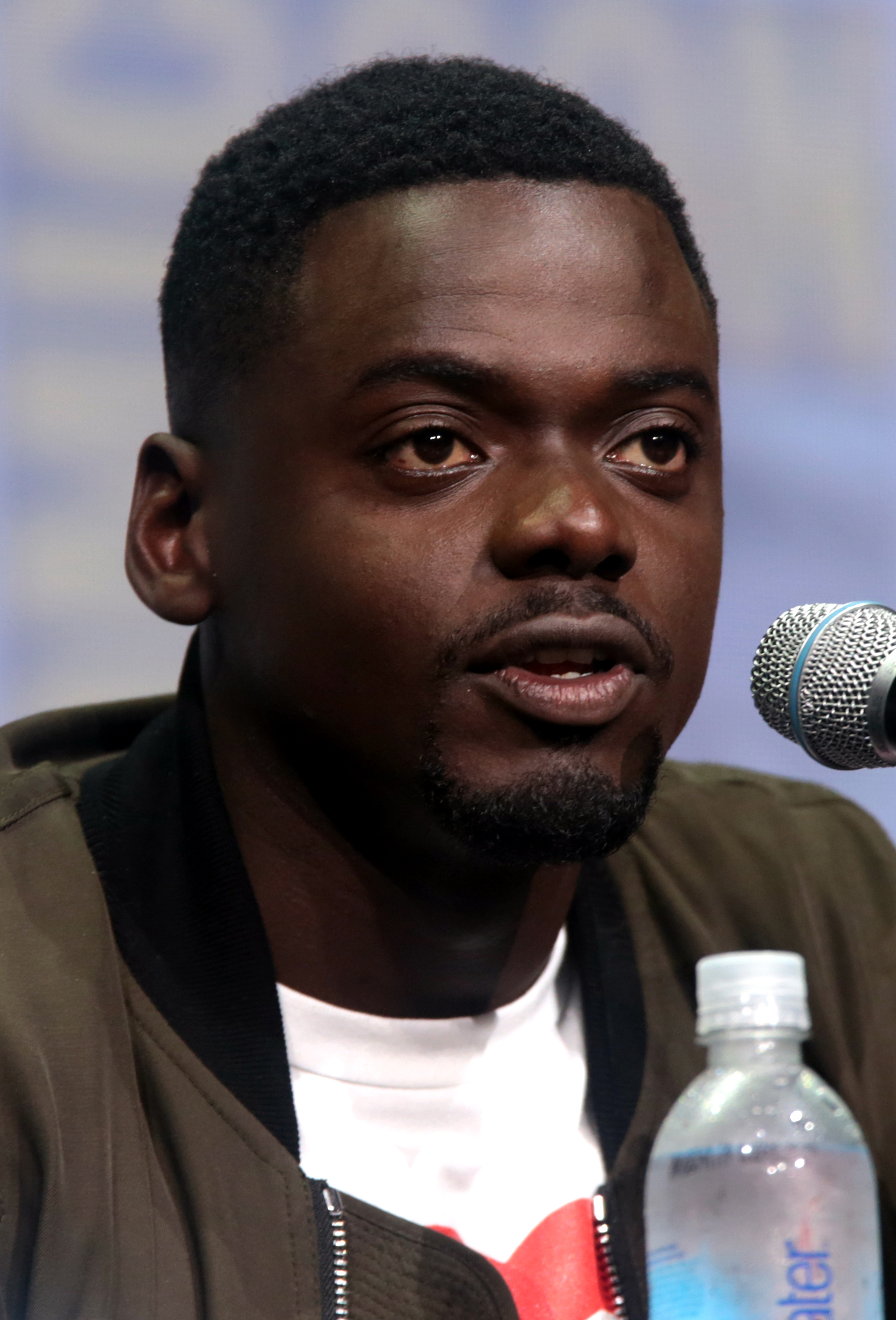
Daniel Kaluuya won for Judas and the Black Messiah (2020)

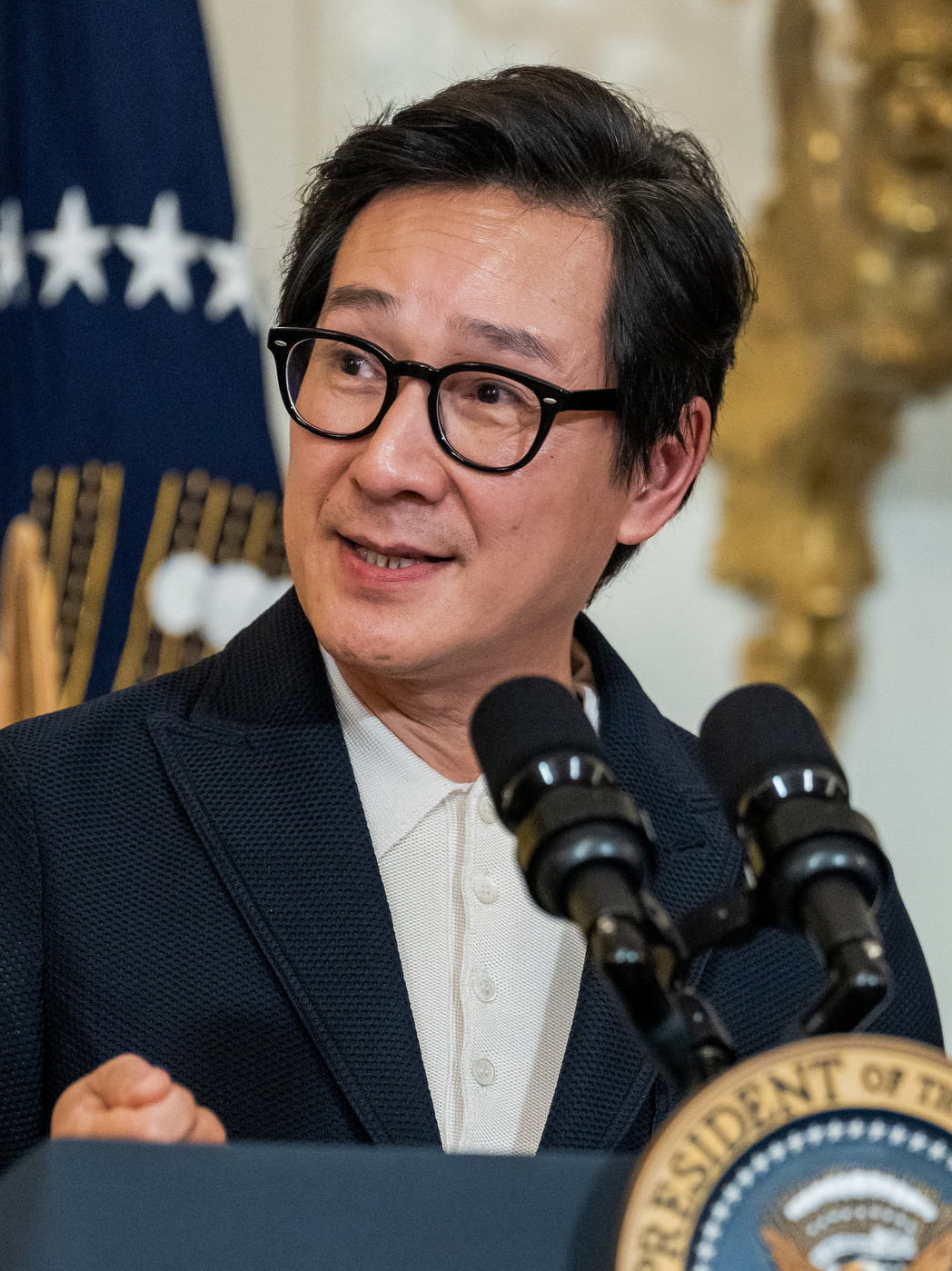
Ke Huy Quan won for Everything Everywhere All at Once (2022)

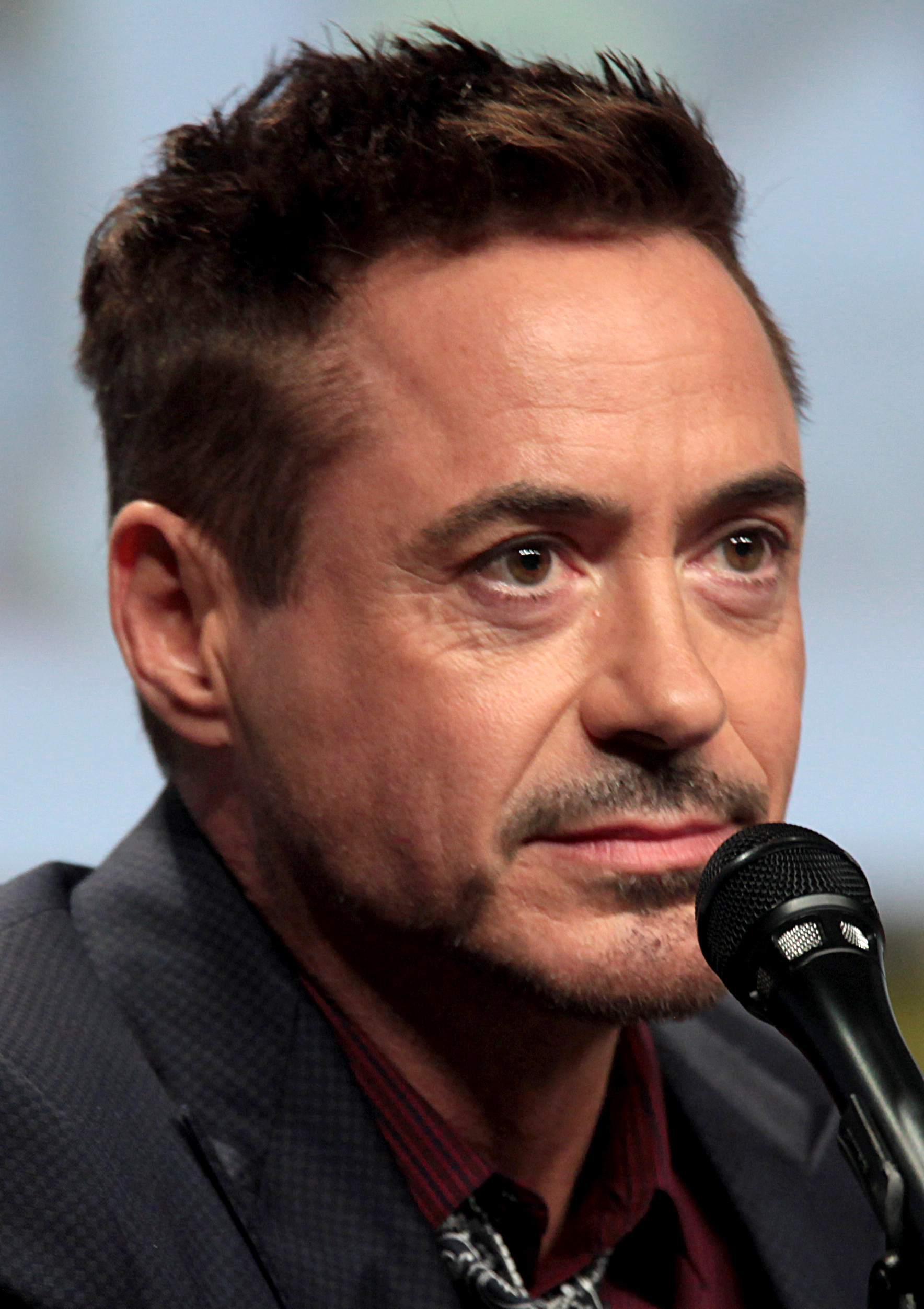
Robert Downey Jr. won for Oppenheimer (2023)

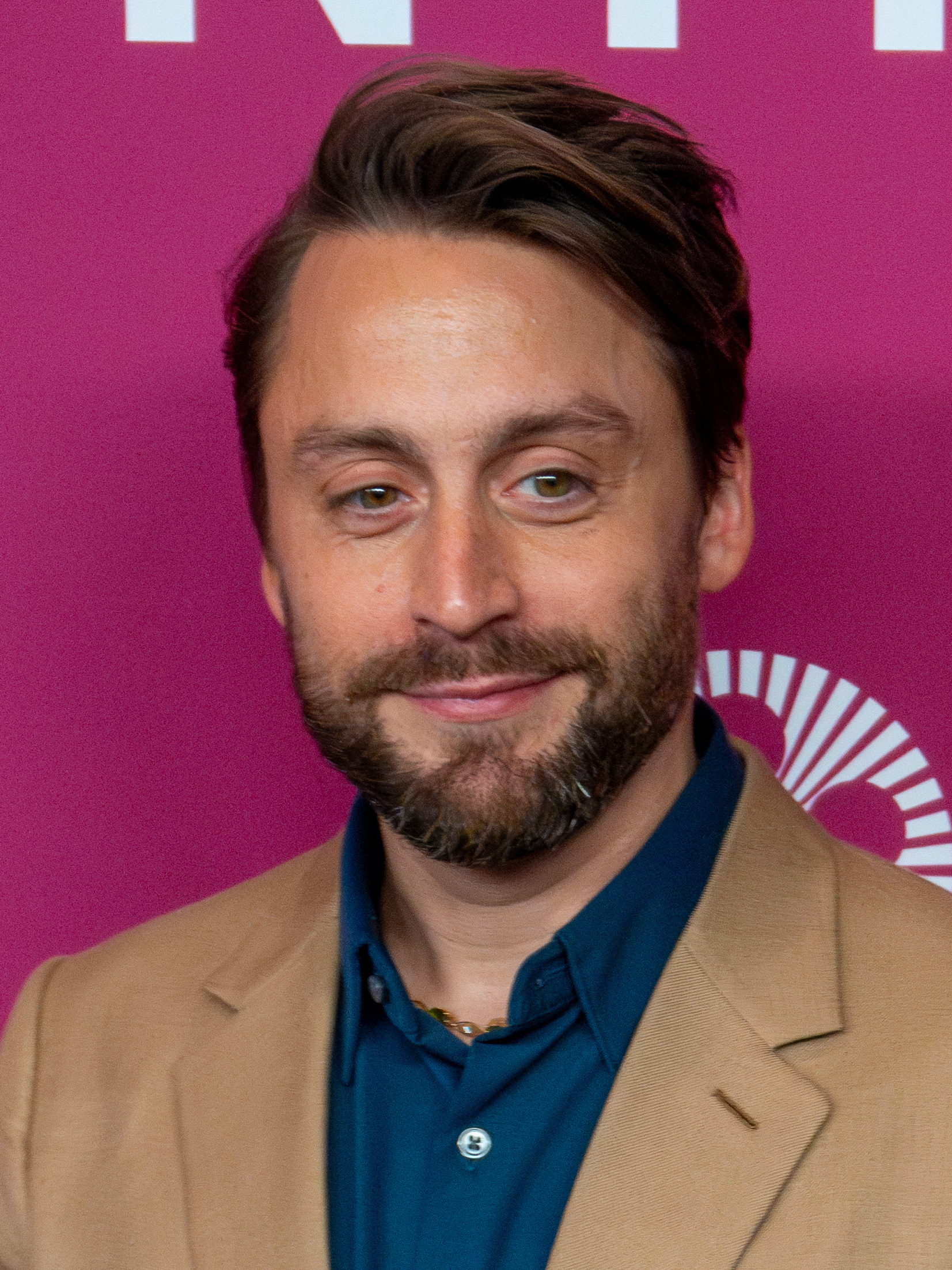
Kieran Culkin won for A Real Pain (2024)

=== 1940s ===
Year	Actor	Role(s)	Film	Ref.
1943	Akim Tamiroff	Pablo	For Whom the Bell Tolls	
1944	Barry Fitzgerald	Father Fitzgibbon	Going My Way	
1945	J. Carrol Naish	Charley Martin	A Medal for Benny	
1946	Clifton Webb	Elliott Templeton	The Razor's Edge	
1947	Edmund Gwenn	Kris Kringle	Miracle on 34th Street	
1948	Walter Huston	Howard	The Treasure of the Sierra Madre	
1949	James Whitmore	Kinnie	Battleground	

=== 1950s ===
Year	Actor	Role(s)	Film	Ref.
1950	Edmund Gwenn	'Skipper' Miller	Mister 880	
1950	George Sanders	Addison DeWitt	All About Eve	
1950	Erich von Stroheim	Max Von Mayerling	Sunset Boulevard	
1951	Peter Ustinov	Nero	Quo Vadis	
1952	Millard Mitchell	James Connie	My Six Convicts	
1952	Kurt Kasznar	Uncle Louis Bonnard	The Happy Time	
1952	Gilbert Roland	Victor 'Gaucho' Ribera	The Bad and the Beautiful	
1953	Frank Sinatra	Pvt. Angelo Maggio	From Here to Eternity	
1954	Edmond O'Brien	Oscar Muldoon	The Barefoot Contessa	
1955	Arthur Kennedy	Barney	Trial	
1956	Earl Holliman	Jim Curry	The Rainmaker	
1956	Eddie Albert	Capt. McLean	The Teahouse of the August Moon	
1956	Oscar Homolka	General Kutuzov	War and Peace	
1956	Anthony Quinn	Paul Gauguin	Lust for Life	
1956	Eli Wallach	Silva Vacarro	Baby Doll	
1957	Red Buttons	Joe Kelly	Sayonara	
1957	Lee J. Cobb	Juror #3	12 Angry Men	
1957	Sessue Hayakawa	Colonel Saito	The Bridge on the River Kwai	
1957	Nigel Patrick	Prof. Jerusalem Webster Stiles	Raintree County	
1957	Ed Wynn	Paul Beaseley	The Great Man	
1958	Burl Ives	Rufus Hannassey	The Big Country	
1958	Harry Guardino	Angelo Donatello	Houseboat	
1958	David Ladd	David Chandler	The Proud Rebel	
1958	Gig Young	Dr. Hugo Pine	Teacher's Pet	
1958	Efrem Zimbalist Jr.	Jacob 'Jake' Diamond	Home Before Dark	
1959	Stephen Boyd	Messala	Ben-Hur	
1959	Fred Astaire	Julian Osborn	On the Beach	
1959	Tony Randall	Jonathan Forbes	Pillow Talk	
1959	Robert Vaughn	Chester A. 'Chet' Gwynn	The Young Philadelphians	
1959	Joseph N. Welch	Judge Weaver	Anatomy of a Murder	

=== 1960s ===
Year	Actor	Role(s)	Film	Ref.
1960	Sal Mineo	Dov Landau	Exodus	
1960	Woody Strode	Draba	Spartacus	
1960	Peter Ustinov	Lentulus Batiatus	Spartacus	
1960	Lee Kinsolving	Sammy Goldenbaum	The Dark at the Top of the Stairs	
1960	Ray Stricklyn	Jeb Lucas Tyler	The Plunderers	
1961	George Chakiris	Bernardo	West Side Story	
1961	Montgomery Clift	Rudolph Petersen	Judgment at Nuremberg	
1961	Jackie Gleason	Minnesota Fats	The Hustler	
1961	Tony Randall	Peter 'Pete' Ramsey	Lover Come Back	
1961	George C. Scott	Bert Gordon	The Hustler	
1962	Omar Sharif	Sherif Ali	Lawrence of Arabia	
1962	Ed Begley	Tom Boss Finley	Sweet Bird of Youth	
1962	Victor Buono	Edwin Flagg	What Ever Happened to Baby Jane?	
1962	Harry Guardino	Sgt. Joseph Contini	The Pigeon That Took Rome	
1962	Ross Martin	Garland Humphrey 'Red' Lynch	Experiment in Terror	
1962	Paul Newman	The Battler	Hemingway's Adventures of a Young Man	
1962	Cesar Romero	Robert Swan / Adam Wright	If a Man Answers	
1962	Telly Savalas	Feto Gomez	Birdman of Alcatraz	
1962	Peter Sellers	Clare Quilty	Lolita	
1962	Harold J. Stone	Frank Garnell	The Chapman Report	
1963	John Huston	Cardinal Glennon	The Cardinal	
1963	Paul Mann	Aleko Sinnikoglou	America America	
1963	Gregory Rozakis	Hohannes Gardashian	America America	
1963	Lee J. Cobb	Harry R. Baker	Come Blow Your Horn	
1963	Bobby Darin	Cpl. Jim Tompkins	Captain Newman, M.D.	
1963	Melvyn Douglas	Homer Bannon	Hud	
1963	Hugh Griffith	Squire Western	Tom Jones	
1963	Roddy McDowall	Octavian, alias Augustus	Cleopatra	
1964	Edmond O'Brien	Senator Ray Clark	Seven Days in May	
1964	Cyril Delevanti	Nonno	The Night of the Iguana	
1964	Stanley Holloway	Alfred P. Doolittle	My Fair Lady	
1964	Gilbert Roland	Dull Knife	Cheyenne Autumn	
1964	Lee Tracy	Art Hockstader	The Best Man	
1965	Oskar Werner	Fiedler	The Spy Who Came in from the Cold	
1965	Red Buttons	Arthur Landau	Harlow	
1965	Frank Finlay	Iago	Othello	
1965	Hardy Krüger	Heinrich Dorfmann	The Flight of the Phoenix	
1965	Telly Savalas	Sgt. Guffy	Battle of the Bulge	
1966	Richard Attenborough	Frenchy Burgoyne	The Sand Pebbles	
1966	Mako	Po-han	The Sand Pebbles	
1966	John Saxon	Chuy Medina	The Appaloosa	
1966	George Segal	Nick	Who's Afraid of Virginia Woolf?	
1966	Robert Shaw	Henry VIII	A Man for All Seasons	
1967	Richard Attenborough	Albert Blossom	Doctor Dolittle	
1967	John Cassavetes	Victor R. Franko	The Dirty Dozen	
1967	George Kennedy	Dragline	Cool Hand Luke	
1967	Michael J. Pollard	C.W. Moss	Bonnie and Clyde	
1967	Efrem Zimbalist Jr.	Sam Hendrix	Wait Until Dark	
1968	Daniel Massey	Noël Coward	Star!	
1968	Beau Bridges	Tim Austin	For Love of Ivy	
1968	Ossie Davis	Joseph Lee	The Scalphunters	
1968	Hugh Griffith	Lebedev	The Fixer	
1968	Hugh Griffith	The Magistrate	Oliver!	
1968	Martin Sheen	Timmy Cleary	The Subject Was Roses	
1969	Gig Young	Rocky	They Shoot Horses, Don't They?	
1969	Red Buttons	Sailor	They Shoot Horses, Don't They?	
1969	Jack Nicholson	George Hanson	Easy Rider	
1969	Anthony Quayle	Cardinal Thomas Wolsey	Anne of the Thousand Days	
1969	Mitch Vogel	Lucius McCaslin	The Reivers	

=== 1970s ===
Year	Actor	Role(s)	Film	Ref.
1970	John Mills	Michael	Ryan's Daughter	
1970	Chief Dan George	Old Lodge Skins	Little Big Man	
1970	Trevor Howard	Father Collins	Ryan's Daughter	
1970	George Kennedy	Joe Patroni	Airport	
1970	John Marley	Phil Cavalleri	Love Story	
1971	Ben Johnson	Sam the Lion	The Last Picture Show	
1971	Tom Baker	Rasputin	Nicholas and Alexandra	
1971	Art Garfunkel	Sandy	Carnal Knowledge	
1971	Paul Mann	Lazar Wolf	Fiddler on the Roof	
1971	Jan-Michael Vincent	Jimmy Graham	Going Home	
1972	Joel Grey	Master of Ceremonies	Cabaret	
1972	James Caan	Sonny Corleone	The Godfather	
1972	James Coco	Sancho Panza	Man of La Mancha	
1972	Alec McCowen	Henry Pulling	Travels with My Aunt	
1972	Clive Revill	Carlo Carlucci	Avanti!	
1973	John Houseman	Charles W. Kingsfield Jr.	The Paper Chase	
1973	Martin Balsam	Harry Walden	Summer Wishes, Winter Dreams	
1973	Jack Gilford	Phil Greene	Save the Tiger	
1973	Randy Quaid	Meadows	The Last Detail	
1973	Max von Sydow	Father Merrin	The Exorcist	
1974	Fred Astaire	Harlee Claiborne	The Towering Inferno	
1974	Bruce Dern	Tom Buchanan	The Great Gatsby	
1974	Sam Waterston	Nick Carraway	The Great Gatsby	
1974	Eddie Albert	Warden Hazen	The Longest Yard	
1974	John Huston	Noah Cross	Chinatown	
1975	Richard Benjamin	Ben Clark	The Sunshine Boys	
1975	John Cazale	Sal	Dog Day Afternoon	
1975	Charles Durning	Eugene Moretti	Dog Day Afternoon	
1975	Henry Gibson	Haven Hamilton	Nashville	
1975	Burgess Meredith	Harry Greener	The Day of the Locust	
1976	Laurence Olivier	Christian Szell	Marathon Man	
1976	Marty Feldman	Marty Eggs	Silent Movie	
1976	Ron Howard	Gillom Rogers	The Shootist	
1976	Jason Robards	Benjamin C. Bradlee	All the President's Men	
1976	Oskar Werner	Professor Egon Kreisler	Voyage of the Damned	
1977	Peter Firth	Alan Strang	Equus	
1977	Jason Robards	Dashiell Hammett	Julia	
1977	Maximilian Schell	Johann	Julia	
1977	Mikhail Baryshnikov	Yuri Kopeikine	The Turning Point	
1977	Alec Guinness	Obi-Wan Kenobi	Star Wars	
1978	John Hurt	Max	Midnight Express	
1978	Bruce Dern	Bob Hyde	Coming Home	
1978	Dudley Moore	Stanley Tibbets	Foul Play	
1978	Robert Morley	Max	Who Is Killing the Great Chefs of Europe?	
1978	Christopher Walken	Cpl. Nikanor "Nick" Chevotarevich	The Deer Hunter	
1979	Melvyn Douglas	Benjamin Rand	Being There	
1979	Robert Duvall	Lt. Col. Bill Kilgore	Apocalypse Now	
1979	Frederic Forrest	Huston Dyer	The Rose	
1979	Justin Henry	Billy Kramer	Kramer vs. Kramer	
1979	Laurence Olivier	Julius	A Little Romance	

=== 1980s ===
Year	Actor	Role(s)	Film	Ref.
1980	Timothy Hutton	Conrad Jarrett	Ordinary People	
1980	Judd Hirsch	Tyrone Berger	Ordinary People	
1980	Joe Pesci	Joey LaMotta	Raging Bull	
1980	Jason Robards	Howard Hughes	Melvin and Howard	
1980	Scott Wilson	Capt. Billy Cutshaw	The Ninth Configuration	
1981	John Gielgud	Hobson	Arthur	
1981	James Coco	Jimmy	Only When I Laugh	
1981	Jack Nicholson	Eugene O'Neill	Reds	
1981	Howard E. Rollins, Jr.	Coalhouse Walker, Jr.	Ragtime	
1981	Orson Welles	Judge Rauch	Butterfly	
1982	Louis Gossett Jr.	Emil Foley	An Officer and a Gentleman	
1982	David Keith	Sid Worley	An Officer and a Gentleman	
1982	Raul Julia	Kalibanos	Tempest	
1982	James Mason	Ed Concannon	The Verdict	
1982	Jim Metzler	Mason McCormick	Tex	
1983	Jack Nicholson	Garrett Breedlove	Terms of Endearment	
1983	Steven Bauer	Manny Ribera	Scarface	
1983	Charles Durning	Col. Erhardt	To Be or Not to Be	
1983	Gene Hackman	Alex Grazier	Under Fire	
1983	Kurt Russell	Drew Stephens	Silkwood	
1984	Haing S. Ngor	Dith Pran	The Killing Fields	
1984	Adolph Caesar	Sgt. Waters	A Soldier's Story	
1984	Richard Crenna	Phil Brody	The Flamingo Kid	
1984	Jeffrey Jones	Emperor Joseph II	Amadeus	
1984	Noriyuki "Pat" Morita	Keisuke Miyagi	The Karate Kid	
1985	Klaus Maria Brandauer	Bror von Blixen-Finecke	Out of Africa	
1985	Joel Grey	Chiun	Remo Williams: The Adventure Begins	
1985	John Lone	Joey Tai	Year of the Dragon	
1985	Eric Roberts	Buck	Runaway Train	
1985	Eric Stoltz	Rocky Dennis	Mask	
1986	Tom Berenger	Sgt. Barnes	Platoon	
1986	Michael Caine	Elliot	Hannah and Her Sisters	
1986	Dennis Hopper	Frank Booth	Blue Velvet	
1986	Dennis Hopper	Shooter	Hoosiers	
1986	Ray Liotta	Ray Sinclair	Something Wild	
1987	Sean Connery	Jim Malone	The Untouchables	
1987	Richard Dreyfuss	Aaron Levinsky	Nuts	
1987	R. Lee Ermey	Gny. Sgt. Hartman	Full Metal Jacket	
1987	Morgan Freeman	Fast Black	Street Smart	
1987	Rob Lowe	Rory	Square Dance	
1988	Martin Landau	Abe Karatz	Tucker: The Man and His Dream	
1988	Alec Guinness	William Dorrit	Little Dorrit	
1988	Neil Patrick Harris	David Hart	Clara's Heart	
1988	Raul Julia	Roberto Strausmann	Moon Over Parador	
1988	Lou Diamond Phillips	Angel Guzman	Stand and Deliver	
1988	River Phoenix	Danny Pope	Running on Empty	
1989	Denzel Washington	Pvt. Trip	Glory	
1989	Danny Aiello	Sal	Do the Right Thing	
1989	Marlon Brando	Ian McKenzie	A Dry White Season	
1989	Sean Connery	Professor Henry Jones	Indiana Jones and the Last Crusade	
1989	Ed Harris	Dave	Jacknife	
1989	Bruce Willis	Emmett Smith	In Country	

=== 1990s ===
Year	Actor	Role(s)	Film	Ref.
1990	Bruce Davison	David	Longtime Companion	
1990	Armand Assante	Roberto "Bobby Tex" Texador	Q & A	
1990	Héctor Elizondo	Barney Thompson	Pretty Woman	
1990	Andy García	Vincent Mancini	The Godfather: Part III	
1990	Al Pacino	Alphonse "Big Boy" Caprice	Dick Tracy	
1990	Joe Pesci	Tommy DeVito	Goodfellas	
1991	Jack Palance	Curly Washburn	City Slickers	
1991	Harvey Keitel	Mickey Cohen	Bugsy	
1991	Ben Kingsley	Meyer Lansky	Bugsy	
1991	Ned Beatty	Josef Locke	Hear My Song	
1991	John Goodman	Charlie Meadows	Barton Fink	
1992	Gene Hackman	Little Bill Daggett	Unforgiven	
1992	Jack Nicholson	Col. Nathan R. Jessup	A Few Good Men	
1992	Chris O'Donnell	Charlie Simms	Scent of a Woman	
1992	Al Pacino	Ricky Roma	Glengarry Glen Ross	
1992	David Paymer	Stan Young	Mr. Saturday Night	
1993	Tommy Lee Jones	Samuel Gerard	The Fugitive	
1993	Leonardo DiCaprio	Arnie Grape	What's Eating Gilbert Grape	
1993	Ralph Fiennes	Amon Goeth	Schindler's List	
1993	John Malkovich	Mitch Leary	In the Line of Fire	
1993	Sean Penn	David Kleinfeld	Carlito's Way	
1994	Martin Landau	Bela Lugosi	Ed Wood	
1994	Kevin Bacon	Wade	The River Wild	
1994	Samuel L. Jackson	Jules Winnfield	Pulp Fiction	
1994	Gary Sinise	Lt. Dan Taylor	Forrest Gump	
1994	John Turturro	Herb Stempel	Quiz Show	
1995	Brad Pitt	Jeffrey Goines	12 Monkeys	
1995	Ed Harris	Gene Kranz	Apollo 13	
1995	John Leguizamo	Chi-Chi Rodriguez	To Wong Foo, Thanks for Everything! Julie Newmar	
1995	Tim Roth	Archibald Cunningham	Rob Roy	
1995	Kevin Spacey	Keyser Söze	The Usual Suspects	
1996	Edward Norton	Aaron Stampler	Primal Fear	
1996	Cuba Gooding Jr.	Rod Tidwell	Jerry Maguire	
1996	Samuel L. Jackson	Carl Lee Hailey	A Time to Kill	
1996	Paul Scofield	Judge Thomas Danforth	The Crucible	
1996	James Woods	Byron De La Beckwith	Ghosts of Mississippi	
1997	Burt Reynolds	Jack Horner	Boogie Nights	
1997	Rupert Everett	George Downes	My Best Friend's Wedding	
1997	Anthony Hopkins	John Quincy Adams	Amistad	
1997	Greg Kinnear	Simon Bishop	As Good as It Gets	
1997	Jon Voight	Leo F. Drummond	The Rainmaker	
1997	Robin Williams	Dr. Sean Maguire	Good Will Hunting	
1998	Ed Harris	Christof	The Truman Show	
1998	Robert Duvall	Jerome Facher	A Civil Action	
1998	Bill Murray	Herman Blume	Rushmore	
1998	Geoffrey Rush	Philip Henslowe	Shakespeare in Love	
1998	Donald Sutherland	Bill Bowerman	Without Limits	
1998	Billy Bob Thornton	Jacob Mitchell	A Simple Plan	
1999	Tom Cruise	Frank T.J. Mackey	Magnolia	
1999	Michael Caine	Dr. Wilbur Larch	The Cider House Rules	
1999	Michael Clarke Duncan	John Coffey	The Green Mile	
1999	Jude Law	Dickie Greenleaf	The Talented Mr. Ripley	
1999	Haley Joel Osment	Cole Sear	The Sixth Sense	

=== 2000s ===
Year	Actor	Role(s)	Film	Ref.
2000	Benicio del Toro	Javier Rodriguez	Traffic	
2000	Jeff Bridges	Jackson Evans	The Contender	
2000	Willem Dafoe	Max Schreck	Shadow of the Vampire	
2000	Albert Finney	Edward L. Masry	Erin Brockovich	
2000	Joaquin Phoenix	Commodus	Gladiator	
2001	Jim Broadbent	John Bayley	Iris	
2001	Steve Buscemi	Seymour	Ghost World	
2001	Hayden Christensen	Sam Monroe	Life as a House	
2001	Ben Kingsley	Don Logan	Sexy Beast	
2001	Jude Law	Gigolo Joe	A.I. Artificial Intelligence	
2001	Jon Voight	Howard Cosell	Ali	
2002	Chris Cooper	John Laroche	Adaptation	
2002	Ed Harris	Richard Brown	The Hours	
2002	Paul Newman	John Rooney	Road to Perdition	
2002	Dennis Quaid	Frank Whitaker	Far from Heaven	
2002	John C. Reilly	Amos Hart	Chicago	
2003	Tim Robbins	Dave Boyle	Mystic River	
2003	Alec Baldwin	Shelly Kaplow	The Cooler	
2003	Albert Finney	Ed Bloom (Old)	Big Fish	
2003	William H. Macy	"Tick Tock" McLaughlin	Seabiscuit	
2003	Peter Sarsgaard	Chuck Lane	Shattered Glass	
2003	Ken Watanabe	Lord Moritsugu Katsumoto	The Last Samurai	
2004	Clive Owen	Larry Gray	Closer	
2004	David Carradine	Bill	Kill Bill: Volume 2	
2004	Jamie Foxx	Max Durocher	Collateral	
2004	Thomas Haden Church	Jack Cole	Sideways	
2004	Morgan Freeman	Eddie "Scrap-Iron" Dupris	Million Dollar Baby	
2005	George Clooney	Bob Barnes	Syriana	
2005	Matt Dillon	John Ryan	Crash	
2005	Will Ferrell	Franz Liebkind	The Producers	
2005	Paul Giamatti	Joe Gould	Cinderella Man	
2005	Bob Hoskins	Vivian Van Damm	Mrs Henderson Presents	
2006	Eddie Murphy	James "Thunder" Early	Dreamgirls	
2006	Jack Nicholson	Frank Costello	The Departed	
2006	Mark Wahlberg	Staff Sgt. Sean Dignam	The Departed	
2006	Ben Affleck	George Reeves	Hollywoodland	
2006	Brad Pitt	Richard Jones	Babel	
2007	Javier Bardem	Anton Chigurh	No Country for Old Men	
2007	Casey Affleck	Robert Ford	The Assassination of Jesse James by the Coward Robert Ford	
2007	Philip Seymour Hoffman	Gust Avrakotos	Charlie Wilson's War	
2007	John Travolta	Edna Turnblad	Hairspray	
2007	Tom Wilkinson	Arthur Edens	Michael Clayton	
2008	Heath Ledger (posthumous)	Joker	The Dark Knight	
2008	Tom Cruise	Les Grossman	Tropic Thunder	
2008	Robert Downey Jr.	Kirk Lazarus	Tropic Thunder	
2008	Ralph Fiennes	William Cavendish	The Duchess	
2008	Philip Seymour Hoffman	Father Brendan Flynn	Doubt	
2009	Christoph Waltz	Col. Hans Landa	Inglourious Basterds	
2009	Matt Damon	Francois Pienaar	Invictus	
2009	Woody Harrelson	Capt. Tony Stone	The Messenger	
2009	Christopher Plummer	Leo Tolstoy	The Last Station	
2009	Stanley Tucci	George Harvey	The Lovely Bones	

=== 2010s ===
Year	Actor	Role(s)	Film	Ref.
2010	Christian Bale	Dicky Eklund	The Fighter	
2010	Michael Douglas	Gordon Gekko	Wall Street: Money Never Sleeps	
2010	Andrew Garfield	Eduardo Saverin	The Social Network	
2010	Jeremy Renner	James "Jem" Coughlin	The Town	
2010	Geoffrey Rush	Lionel Logue	The King's Speech	
2011	Christopher Plummer	Hal Fields	Beginners	
2011	Kenneth Branagh	Laurence Olivier	My Week with Marilyn	
2011	Albert Brooks	Bernie Rose	Drive	
2011	Jonah Hill	Peter Brand	Moneyball	
2011	Viggo Mortensen	Sigmund Freud	A Dangerous Method	
2012	Christoph Waltz	Dr. King Schultz	Django Unchained	
2012	Alan Arkin	Lester Siegel	Argo	
2012	Leonardo DiCaprio	Calvin J. Candie	Django Unchained	
2012	Philip Seymour Hoffman	Lancaster Dodd	The Master	
2012	Tommy Lee Jones	Thaddeus Stevens	Lincoln	
2013	Jared Leto	Rayon	Dallas Buyers Club	
2013	Barkhad Abdi	Abduwali Muse	Captain Phillips	
2013	Daniel Brühl	Niki Lauda	Rush	
2013	Bradley Cooper	Richard "Richie" DiMaso	American Hustle	
2013	Michael Fassbender	Edwin Epps	12 Years a Slave	
2014	J. K. Simmons	Terence Fletcher	Whiplash	
2014	Edward Norton	Mike Shiner	Birdman	
2014	Robert Duvall	Judge Joseph Palmer	The Judge	
2014	Ethan Hawke	Mason Evans, Sr.	Boyhood	
2014	Mark Ruffalo	Dave Schultz	Foxcatcher	
2015	Sylvester Stallone	Rocky Balboa	Creed	
2015	Paul Dano	Brian Wilson	Love & Mercy	
2015	Idris Elba	The Commandant	Beasts of No Nation	
2015	Mark Rylance	Rudolf Abel	Bridge of Spies	
2015	Michael Shannon	Rick Carver	99 Homes	
2016	Aaron Taylor-Johnson	Ray Marcus	Nocturnal Animals	
2016	Mahershala Ali	Juan	Moonlight	
2016	Jeff Bridges	Marcus Hamilton	Hell or High Water	
2016	Simon Helberg	Cosmé McMoon	Florence Foster Jenkins	
2016	Dev Patel	Saroo Brierley	Lion	
2017	Sam Rockwell	Jason Dixon	Three Billboards Outside Ebbing, Missouri	
2017	Willem Dafoe	Bobby Hicks	The Florida Project	
2017	Armie Hammer	Oliver	Call Me by Your Name	
2017	Richard Jenkins	Giles	The Shape of Water	
2017	Christopher Plummer	J. Paul Getty	All the Money in the World	
2018	Mahershala Ali	Don Shirley	Green Book	
2018	Timothée Chalamet	Nic Sheff	Beautiful Boy	
2018	Adam Driver	Flip Zimmerman	BlacKkKlansman	
2018	Richard E. Grant	Jack Hock	Can You Ever Forgive Me?	
2018	Sam Rockwell	George W. Bush	Vice	
2019	Brad Pitt	Cliff Booth	Once Upon a Time in Hollywood	
2019	Al Pacino	Jimmy Hoffa	The Irishman	
2019	Joe Pesci	Russell Bufalino	The Irishman	
2019	Tom Hanks	Fred Rogers	A Beautiful Day in the Neighborhood	
2019	Anthony Hopkins	Pope Benedict XVI	The Two Popes	

=== 2020s ===
Year	Actor	Role(s)	Film	Ref.
2020	Daniel Kaluuya	Fred Hampton	Judas and the Black Messiah	
2020	Sacha Baron Cohen	Abbie Hoffman	The Trial of the Chicago 7	
2020	Jared Leto	Albert Sparma	The Little Things	
2020	Bill Murray	Felix Keane	On the Rocks	
2020	Leslie Odom Jr.	Sam Cooke	One Night in Miami...	
2021	Kodi Smit-McPhee	Peter Gordon	The Power of the Dog	
2021	Ben Affleck	Charlie Maguire	The Tender Bar	
2021	Jamie Dornan	Pa	Belfast	
2021	Ciarán Hinds	Pop	Belfast	
2021	Troy Kotsur	Frank Rossi	CODA	
2022	Ke Huy Quan	Waymond Wang	Everything Everywhere All At Once	
2022	Brendan Gleeson	Colm Doherty	The Banshees of Inisherin	
2022	Barry Keoghan	Dominic Kearney	The Banshees of Inisherin	
2022	Brad Pitt	Jack Conrad	Babylon	
2022	Eddie Redmayne	Charles Cullen	The Good Nurse	
2023	Robert Downey Jr.	Lewis Strauss	Oppenheimer	
2023	Willem Dafoe	Dr. Godwin Baxter	Poor Things	
2023	Robert De Niro	William King Hale	Killers of the Flower Moon	
2023	Ryan Gosling	Ken Carson	Barbie	
2023	Charles Melton	Joe Yoo	May December	
2023	Mark Ruffalo	Duncan Wedderburn	Poor Things	
2024	Kieran Culkin	Benjamin "Benji" Kaplan	A Real Pain	
2024	Yura Borisov	Igor	Anora	
2024	Edward Norton	Pete Seeger	A Complete Unknown	
2024	Guy Pearce	Harrison Lee Van Buren Sr.	The Brutalist	
2024	Jeremy Strong	Roy Cohn	The Apprentice	
2024	Denzel Washington	Macrinus	Gladiator II	
2025	Stellan Skarsgård	Gustav Borg	Sentimental Value	
2025	Benicio del Toro	Sensei Sergio St. Carlos	One Battle After Another	
2025	Jacob Elordi	The Creature	Frankenstein	
2025	Paul Mescal	William Shakespeare	Hamnet	
2025	Sean Penn	Col. Steven J. Lockjaw	One Battle After Another	
2025	Adam Sandler	Ron Sukenick	Jay Kelly	

== Multiple nominations ==
5 nominations

- Jack Nicholson

4 nominations

- Ed Harris
- Brad Pitt

3 nominations

- Red Buttons
- Willem Dafoe
- Robert Duvall
- Hugh Griffith
- Philip Seymour Hoffman
- Edward Norton
- Al Pacino
- Joe Pesci
- Christopher Plummer
- Jason Robards

2 nominations

- Ben Affleck
- Eddie Albert
- Mahershala Ali
- Fred Astaire
- Richard Attenborough
- Jeff Bridges
- Michael Caine
- James Coco
- Sean Connery
- Tom Cruise
- Benicio del Toro
- Bruce Dern
- Leonardo DiCaprio
- Melvyn Douglas
- Robert Downey Jr.
- Charles Durning
- Ralph Fiennes
- Albert Finney
- Morgan Freeman
- Henry Gibson
- Joel Grey
- Harry Guardino
- Alec Guinness
- Edmund Gwenn
- Gene Hackman
- Anthony Hopkins
- Dennis Hopper
- John Huston
- Samuel L. Jackson
- Tommy Lee Jones
- Raul Julia
- George Kennedy
- Ben Kingsley
- Martin Landau
- Jude Law
- Jared Leto
- Paul Mann
- Bill Murray
- Paul Newman
- Edmond O'Brien
- Laurence Olivier
- Sean Penn
- Tony Randall
- Sam Rockwell
- Gilbert Roland
- Mark Ruffalo
- Geoffrey Rush
- Telly Savalas
- Peter Ustinov
- Jon Voight
- Christoph Waltz
- Denzel Washington
- Oskar Werner
- Gig Young
- Efrem Zimbalist Jr.

== Multiple wins ==
2 wins

- Richard Attenborough (consecutive)
- Edmund Gwenn
- Martin Landau
- Edmond O'Brien
- Brad Pitt
- Christoph Waltz

== See also ==
- Academy Award for Best Supporting Actor
- BAFTA Award for Best Actor in a Supporting Role
- Independent Spirit Award for Best Supporting Male
- Critics' Choice Movie Award for Best Supporting Actor
- Screen Actors Guild Award for Outstanding Performance by a Male Actor in a Supporting Role
