= 38 Special discography =

- Studio albums: 13
- Live albums: 4
- Compilation albums: 4
- Singles: 25
- Video albums: 3

38 Special discography consists of 13 studio albums, four compilation albums and four live albums. They have also released 25 singles.

== Albums ==
=== Studio albums ===
Year	Album	Peak chart positions		Certifications
Year	Album	US	CAN	Certifications
1977	38 Special: Released: May 1977; Label: A&M; Format:	148	—	
1978	Special Delivery: Released: March 1978; Label: A&M; Format:	207	—	—
1979	Rockin' into the Night: Released: October 1979; Label: A&M; Format:	57	—	
1981	Wild-Eyed Southern Boys: Released: January 1981; Label: A&M; Format:	18	23	RIAA: Platinum
1982	Special Forces: Released: May 1982; Label: A&M; Format:	10	40	RIAA: Platinum
1983	Tour de Force: Released: November 1983; Label: A&M; Format:	22	53	RIAA: Platinum; CAN: Gold
1986	Strength in Numbers: Released: April 28, 1986; Label: A&M; Format:	17	—	RIAA: Gold
1988	Rock & Roll Strategy: Released: September 1988; Label: A&M; Format:	61	—	
1991	Bone Against Steel: Released: July 1991; Label: Charisma; Format:	170	58	—
1997	Resolution: Released: June 17, 1997; Label: Razor & Tie; Format:	—	—	—
2001	A Wild-Eyed Christmas Night: Released: September 25, 2001; Label: CMC International; Format:	—	—	—
2004	Drivetrain: Released: July 24, 2004; Label: Sanctuary; Format:	—	—	—
2025	Milestone: Released: September 19, 2025; Label: Format:	—	—	—

=== Live albums ===
Year	Album	US	RIAA
1984	Wild Eyed and Live!	—	—
1999	Live at Sturgis	—	—
2010	Live - Nassau Coliseum, Uniondale, New York 01/29/85	—	—
2011	38 Special Live from Texas	—	—

=== Compilation albums ===
Year	Album	US	RIAA
1987	Flashback: The Best of 38 Special	35	Platinum
2000	20th Century Masters—The Millennium Collection: The Best of 38 Special	—	—
2001	Anthology	—	—
2003	The Very Best of the A&M Years (1977–1988)	—	—

== Singles ==
Year	Single	Peak chart positions					Album
Year	Single	US	US Main	US AC	CAN	AUS	Album
1977	"Long Time Gone"	—	—	—	—	—	38 Special
1977	"Tell Everybody"	—	—	—	—	—	38 Special
1980	"Rockin' into the Night"	43	—	—	—	—	Rockin' into the Night
1980	"Stone Cold Believer"	—	—	—	—	—	Rockin' into the Night
1981	"Hold On Loosely"	27	3	—	32	—	Wild-Eyed Southern Boys
1981	"Fantasy Girl"	52	30	—	—	—	Wild-Eyed Southern Boys
1981	"Wild-Eyed Southern Boys"	—	35	—	—	—	Wild-Eyed Southern Boys
1982	"Caught Up in You"	10	1	—	9	—	Special Forces
1982	"Chain Lightnin'"	—	9	—	—	—	Special Forces
1982	"Back on the Track"	—	56	—	—	—	Special Forces
1982	"You Keep Runnin' Away"	38	7	—	—	—	Special Forces
1982	"Prisoners of Rock 'n' Roll"	—	—	—	—	—	B-Side of "You Keep Runnin' Away"
1983	"If I'd Been the One"	19	1	—	49	—	Tour de Force
1983	"Back Where You Belong"	20	4	—	—	—	Tour de Force
1984	"One Time for Old Times"	—	17	—	—	—	Tour de Force
1984	"Teacher, Teacher"	25	4	—	26	—	Teachers (soundtrack)
1986	"Like No Other Night"	14	4	—	80	—	Strength in Numbers
1986	"Somebody Like You"	48	6	—	—	—	Strength in Numbers
1986	"Heart's on Fire"	—	30	—	—	—	Strength in Numbers
1987	"Back to Paradise"	41	4	—	49	—	Flashback: The Best of 38 Special
1988	"Little Sheba"	—	15	—	—	—	Rock & Roll Strategy
1988	"Rock & Roll Strategy"	67	5	—	—	—	Rock & Roll Strategy
1989	"Second Chance"	6	2	1	2	14	Rock & Roll Strategy
1989	"Comin' Down Tonight"	67	43	—	—	—	Rock & Roll Strategy
1991	"Rebel to Rebel"	—	30	—	—	—	Bone Against Steel
1991	"The Sound of Your Voice"	33	2	—	43	133	Bone Against Steel
1991	"Signs of Love"	—	—	—	—	—	Bone Against Steel
1997	"Fade to Blue"	—	33	—	50	—	Resolution
"—" denotes releases that did not chart

== Soundtrack appearances ==
- "Back to Paradise" (from Revenge of the Nerds II: Nerds in Paradise) (1987)
- "Teacher, Teacher" (from Teachers) (1984)
- "Trooper with an Attitude" (from Super Troopers) (2001)

== Video Albums ==
Year	Album details
1984	Wild Eyed and Live!: Release date: 1984; Label: Pioneer Artists (LaserDisc), A&M Video (VHS, Beta); Live at Nassau Coliseum in Uniondale, NY July 1984
Year	Album details
2004	The Best of 38 Special: The DVD Collection: Release date: 2004; Label: Universal Music Group (DVD); Part of 20th Century Masters budget release line from UMG. Contains five music videos.

== Bootlegs ==
- 1977 My Father's Place, Old Roslyn 1977
- 1979 Rockin' in Old Roslyn
- 1980 Denver, Colorado 3/26/80
- 1984 Eldorado Road
- 1984 Wild Eyed and Live! in Long Island's Nassau Coliseum, July 1984
- 1987 Westwood One: Live at the Summit in Houston Texas 5-8-1987
- 1988 Memphis 1988
- 2000 Live in Concert (Memphis, TN)
