= Flashback: The Best of 38 Special =

Greatest hits album by 38 Special
- Released: July 1987
- Recorded: 1978–1987
- Genre: Southern rock, AOR, hard rock
- Length: 57:22
- Label: A&M

38 Special chronology
Strength in Numbers (1986)	Flashback: The Best of 38 Special (1987)	Rock & Roll Strategy (1988)

Professional ratings
Review scores
Source	Rating
Allmusic	4.5/5 stars

Flashback: The Best of 38 Special is a best-of compilation album by the southern rock band 38 Special, released in 1987. It contains several of the band's greatest hits, such as "Hold On Loosely" and "Caught Up in You", as well as two hit songs from soundtracks previously unavailable on a 38 Special album, "Back to Paradise" and "Teacher, Teacher". It also features one brand-new track unique to this compilation, "Same Old Feeling". The vinyl version of this release included the studio tracks on a 12-inch LP and the four live tracks on a separate 7-inch EP.

== Track listing ==
No.	Title	Original Album	Length
1.	"Back to Paradise" (new song)	Theme from Revenge of the Nerds II: Nerds in Paradise	3:42
2.	"Hold On Loosely"	Wild-Eyed Southern Boys	4:39
3.	"Wild-Eyed Southern Boys" (Live at The Summit, Houston, Texas, October 31, 1986)	Wild-Eyed Southern Boys	4:13
4.	"If I'd Been the One"	Tour de Force	3:55
5.	"Caught Up in You"	Special Forces	4:36
6.	"Fantasy Girl"	Wild-Eyed Southern Boys	4:04
7.	"Rough-Housin'" (Live at The Summit, Houston, Texas, October 31, 1986)	Special Forces	4:10
8.	"Same Old Feeling"	New song	4:18
9.	"Back Where You Belong"	Tour de Force	4:29
10.	"Stone Cold Believer" (Live at The Summit, Houston, Texas, October 31, 1986)	Rockin' into the Night	3:57
11.	"Teacher, Teacher"	From soundtrack of the motion picture Teachers	3:15
12.	"Like No Other Night"	Strength In Numbers	3:58
13.	"Twentieth Century Fox" (Live at The Summit, Houston, Texas, October 31, 1986)	Tour de Force	4:15
14.	"Rockin' into the Night"	Rockin' Into The Night	3:57
Total length:			57:22

The live tracks were recorded by the Westwood One Mobile.

== Personnel ==
- Don Barnes – guitar, lead vocals, background vocals, harmonica on "Rough Housin'"
- Donnie Van Zant – background vocals, lead vocals on tracks 3, 7, 10, 13
- Jeff Carlisi – dobro, guitar, steel guitar
- Larry Junstrom – bass guitar
- Steve Brookins – percussion, drums
- Jack Grondin – drums

== Charts ==
Chart (1987)	Peak position
US Billboard 200	35

== Certifications ==
Region	Certification	Certified units/sales
United States (RIAA)	Platinum	1,000,000^{^}
^{^} Shipments figures based on certification alone.
