= Live at Sturgis =

Live album by 38 Special
- Released: November 9, 1999
- Recorded: August 12, 1999
- Genre: Southern rock, AOR, hard rock, pop rock
- Length: 66:50
- Label: CMC International
- Producer: Don Barnes, Danny Chauncey, Ben Fowler, 38 Special

38 Special chronology
Resolution (1997)	Live at Sturgis (1999)	A Wild-Eyed Christmas Night (2001)

Professional ratings
Review scores
Source	Rating
Allmusic	link

Live at Sturgis is a live album by the southern rock band 38 Special, released in 1999. It was recorded at the Buffalo Chip Campground in Sturgis, South Dakota, on August 12, 1999, during the Sturgis Motorcycle Rally except for the last track, which is a new studio recording from the same year.

== Track listing ==
1. "Rockin' into the Night" (Jim Peterik, Gary Smith, Frankie Sullivan) – 4:53
2. "Twentieth Century Fox" (Don Barnes, Jeff Carlisi, Larry Steele, Donnie Van Zant) – 4:01
3. "Back Where You Belong" (Gary O'Connor) – 4:31
4. "Wild-Eyed Southern Boys" (Peterik) – 5:38
5. "Fade to Blue" (Barnes, Danny Chauncey, Peterik) – 4:41
6. "If I'd Been the One" (Barnes, Carlisi, Steele, Van Zant) – 4:08
7. "Rebel to Rebel" (Carlisi, Peterik, Van Zant) – 7:01
8. "Take 'Em Out" (Barnes, Carlisi, Steele, Van Zant) – 4:17
9. "Déjà Voodoo" (Barnes, Carlisi, Robert White Johnson, Peterik, Van Zant) – 6:31
10. "Fantasy Girl" (Carlisi, Peterik) – 4:16
11. "Caught Up in You" (Barnes, Carlisi, Peterik) – 6:23
12. "Hold On Loosely" (Barnes, Carlisi, Peterik) – 5:54
13. "Just One Girl" (Barnes, Chauncey, Peterik) – 4:36

== Personnel ==
retrieved from liner notes images

- Don Barnes - guitar, vocals
- Bobby Capps - keyboards, vocals
- Danny Chauncey - guitar, vocals
- Larry Junstrom - bass guitar
- Gary Moffatt - drums
- Donnie Van Zant - guitar, vocals

== Production ==
- Producer: Don Barnes, Danny Chauncey, Ben Fowler, 38 Special
- Live production: Ken Botelho
- Engineers: Allen Ditto, Ben Fowler, Edd Miller
- Mixing: Ben Fowler, Edd Miller
- Mastering: Glenn Meadows, Charlie Watts
- Concept: Mark Weiss
- Graphic design: Al Lehman, Mike McLaughlin, Richard Rodriguez
- Art Direction: Mark Weiss
- Digital Imaging: Al Lehman, Mike McLaughlin, Richard Rodriguez
- Assistant: Amy Palyce
- Photography: Mark Weiss
