= 38 Special Live from Texas =

38 Special Live From Texas

Live album by 38 Special
- Released: August 29, 2011
- Genre: Southern rock
- Label: 38 Special Records

38 Special chronology
Drivetrain (2004)	38 Special Live From Texas (2011)	Milestone (2025)

38 Special Live From Texas is a live album by the southern rock band 38 Special, recorded in 2009 and released in 2011.

== Track listing ==
1. Rockin' into the Night
2. 20th Century Fox
3. Back Where You Belong
4. Wild-Eyed Southern Boys
5. The Squeeze
6. If I'd Been the One
7. Help Somebody
8. Fantasy Girl
9. Trooper with an Attitude
10. Medley: Back to Paradise
11. Medley: Somebody Like You
12. Medley: Teacher Teacher
13. Medley: Rough Housin'
14. Medley: Stone Cold Believer
15. Medley: Like No Other Night
16. Medley: Second Chance
17. Caught Up in You
18. Chain Lightnin'
19. Hold On Loosely
20. Back in the U.S.A.
21. Travelin' Band

== Personnel ==
- Donnie Van Zant - lead and background vocals
- Don Barnes - guitar, lead and background vocals
- Bobby Capps - keyboards, lead and background vocals
- Danny Chauncey - guitar, keyboards
- Larry Junstrom - bass guitar
- Gary Moffatt - drums
