= Ken Lyons =

- Birth name: Kenneth Leo Lyons
- Born: March 17, 1953; Jacksonville, Florida
- Died: May 20, 2012 (aged 59); Winston-Salem, North Carolina
- Genres: Southern rock
- Occupation: Musician
- Instrument: Bass guitar

Kenneth Leo Lyons (March 17, 1953 – May 20, 2012) was a bass guitarist and founding member of the southern rock band 38 Special. He was born to mother Joyce Lavelle Godwin Lyons and father Clynn Leo Lyons in Jacksonville, Florida. He founded 38 Special with Don Barnes, Donnie Van Zant, Jack Grondin, Steve Brookins, and Jeff Carlisi in 1974. He was a member of 38 special from 1974 to 1977. He only played on their self-titled debut album. He left 38 Special in 1977, before their first album was released. Lyons was replaced by Larry Junstrom, who continued to play in 38 Special until his retirement in 2014. Lyons died on May 20, 2012, at the age of 59 at the Wake Forest Baptist Health Center in Winston-Salem, North Carolina.
