= Bone Against Steel =

Studio album by 38 Special
- Released: June 21, 1991
- Recorded: 1990
- Genres: Pop rock, soft rock, Southern rock
- Length: 63:48
- Label: Charisma
- Producer: Rodney Mills

38 Special chronology
| Rock & Roll Strategy (1988) | Bone Against Steel (1991) | Resolution (1997) |

The Sound of Your Voice cover

Professional ratings
Review scores
| Source | Rating |
|---|---|
| AllMusic | 2/5 stars |

Bone Against Steel is the ninth studio album by the southern rock band 38 Special, released in 1991. It was their last album until their 1997 comeback and the last album to feature the vocalist and keyboard player Max Carl. It would also be their last album with long time guitarist and founding member Jeff Carlisi and drummer Jack Grondin.

The album itself was a modest commercial success and only reached #170 on the Billboard 200 album chart. However, the single "The Sound of Your Voice" (also known as "Sound of Your Voice"), was a major hit, and one of three songs co-written by Survivor's Jim Peterik for the album. The song reached #2 on the Billboard Mainstream Rock chart and #33 on the Billboard Hot 100 (their last Top 40 hit and last appearance on that chart to date), while the second of the three Peterik songs, "Rebel to Rebel", only reached #30 on the Billboard Mainstream Rock chart.

== Track listing ==
1. "The Sound of Your Voice" (Max Carl, Jeff Carlisi, Danny Chauncey, Jim Peterik) – 4:58
2. "Signs of Love" (Carl) – 4:49
3. "Last Thing I Ever Do" (Carlisi, Chauncey, Robert White Johnson, Michael Lunn, Donnie Van Zant) – 5:22
4. "You Definitely Got Me" (Carl, Carlisi, Chauncey) – 5:12
5. "Rebel to Rebel" (Carlisi, Peterik, Van Zant) – 5:33
6. "Bone Against Steel" (Carl) – 5:24
7. "You Be the Dam, I'll Be the Water" (Carl, Johnson, Van Stephenson, Van Zant) – 4:26
8. "Jimmy Gillum" (Carl, Carlisi, Chauncey, Van Zant) – 5:07
9. "Tear It Up" (Carl, Carlisi, Chauncey) – 4:39
10. "Don't Wanna Get It Dirty" (Johnson, Lunn, Van Zant) – 4:36
11. "Burning Bridges" (Carl, Carlisi, Chauncey) – 4:45
12. "Can't Shake It" (Johnson, Lunn, Van Zant) – 3:29
13. "Treasure" (Carl, Carlisi, Peterik) – 5:40

== Personnel ==
=== .38 Special ===
- Max Carl – keyboards, lead vocals (1, 2, 4, 6, 7, 9, 11, 13) backing vocals
- Jeff Carlisi – guitars
- Danny Chauncey – guitars
- Larry Junstrom – bass
- Jack Grondin – drums
- Donnie Van Zant – lead vocals (3, 5, 8, 10, 12), backing vocals

=== Guest musicians ===
- Scott Meeder – drum programming, percussion, cymbals
- Michael Hoskin – alto saxophone, baritone saxophone
- Larry Jackson – tenor saxophone
- Gordon Vernick – trumpet
- The Six Groomers (the band) – backing vocals
- Robert White Johnson – backing vocals
- Jack Blades – backing vocals (9)
- Brian Howe – backing vocals (9)

== Production ==
- Rodney Mills – producer, recording, mixing
- Tag George – recording assistant, mix assistant
- Edd Miller – recording assistant
- Phil Tan – recording assistant
- Bob Ludwig – mastering
- Masterdisk (New York City, New York) – mastering location
- Mark Rogers – tape operation
- Norman Moore – art direction, design
- John Halpern – band photography
- Peter Miller – cover photography

== Critical reception ==
In a review of Bone Against Steel, Alex Henderson of AllMusic regarded "The Sound of Your Voice" as one of the "Tame, run-of-the-mill corporate rock tunes" which he commented "sound like third-rate Journey, and don't hold a candle to some of Special's earlier efforts."

== Charts ==
Album – Billboard (United States) RPM Magazine (Canada)

| Year | Chart | Position |
|---|---|---|
| 1991 | The Billboard 200 | 170 |
| 1991 | The RPM 100 | 58 |

Singles – Billboard (United States)

| Year | Single | Chart | Position |
|---|---|---|---|
| 1991 | "Rebel to Rebel" | Mainstream Rock Tracks | 30 |
| 1991 | "The Sound of Your Voice" | Mainstream Rock Tracks | 2 |
| 1991 | "The Sound of Your Voice" | The Billboard Hot 100 | 33 |

For The Sound of Your Voice:

| Chart (1991) | Peak position |
|---|---|
| Australia (ARIA) | 133 |
| Canada (Canadian Hot 100) | 43 |
| US Billboard Hot 100 | 33 |
| US Mainstream Rock (Billboard) | 2 |
