= Gary Smith (drummer) =

American musician and songwriter (born 1950)

- Born: Robert Gary Smith; March 8, 1950 (age 76); Phoenix, Arizona, United States
- Genres: Rock, jazz, jazz-rock fusion
- Occupations: Musician, songwriter
- Instruments: Drums, percussion
- Years active: 1969–present
- Website: garysmithdrums.com

Robert Gary Smith (born March 9, 1950) is an American musician and songwriter. He was a member of Chase and a founding member of Survivor. Smith has also performed or recorded with B.B. King, Joe Williams, Vic Damone, Patrick Leonard, Leslie West (Mountain), Steve Forman, Will Lee, Elliott Randall, Bobby Kimball, Tommy Shaw, Darryl Jones, Jim Peterik, John Gary, Bruce Gaitsch, Eric Miyashiro, Clark Terry, Chuck Findley, Larry Carlton, Jaco Pastorius and many others.

== Career ==
Smith was born in Phoenix, Arizona, United States. He began backing up local musicians in his teens and had stints with Steve Forman's Eclectic Mouse and Joe Williams before the age of 21.

Smith joined the Chicago-based jazz-rock fusion band Chase in the fall of 1971 and recorded the album Ennea. The band received a Grammy nomination for Best New Artist that year. Smith, trumpeter/vocalist Ted Piercefield and bassist Dennis Keith Johnson left the band in 1972 and formed the band X in South Florida. X disbanded before it could sign a pending record deal. Chase bandleader Bill Chase, keyboardist Wally Yohn, drummer Walter Clark, guitarist John Emma, pilot Dan Ludwig and the co-pilot died in a tragic plane crash in 1974.

Smith returned to Chicago in 1976 to do studio work. He formed Shy Rhythm with Johnson, keyboardist Terry Fryer and guitarist Bruce Gaitsch. The group backed singer Jim Peterik on his first solo album, Don't Fight The Feeling, on Epic Records, and formed the Jim Peterik Band.

Gaitsch and Fryer departed in 1978, both going on to become in-demand session musicians. The remaining members added singer Dave Bickler and guitarist Frankie Sullivan and became Survivor. The band was signed by Atlantic Records A&R executive John Kalodner, and its self-titled debut album was released in 1979 on the Atlantic subsidiary Scotti Brothers. Smith co-wrote “Rockin’ into The Night” and “Rebel Girl,” but neither song was included on the group's first album. “Rockin' into the Night" became .38 Special's first hit single. It has appeared on multiple .38 Special albums, including the platinum-selling Flashback. The Survivor non-album single "Rebel Girl" was covered by the Outlaws. Survivor's versions of both of these songs appeared on their 2004 greatest hits album, Ultimate Survivor.

Smith and Johnson were replaced in Survivor in 1981, in part because of conflicts with their other projects. Survivor went on released its first Top 40 single, "Poor Man's Son," the same year. The band made its breakthrough in 1982 when "Eye of the Tiger" hit No. 1 on the Billboard charts for six weeks and won a Grammy Award.

Meanwhile, Smith formed the Chicago jazz-rock band Software with Johnson, Patrick Leonard, Bill Ruppert and Mark Colby. The band recorded one album, Marbles, released in 1981.

Smith later toured with Leslie West, but opted out of recording and touring with West because of his session work. Smith became one of the first-call studio drummers in Chicago through the 1980s and into the 1990s before he returned to Arizona. He played on several thousand studio sessions, including records, movie tracks and hundreds of radio and TV commercials.

Smith was noted for his work with Chase in the April 2002 Modern Drummer article "Jazz/Rock Pioneers" in company with drummers Bobby Colomby (Blood, Sweat & Tears), Danny Seraphine (Chicago), Billy Cobham (Dreams, Mahavishnu Orchestra), and Jay Burrid (Chase).

== Selected discography ==
=== Chase ===
- Ennea (1972)
- Watch Closely Now (1977)
- Chase Concert Series Vol. 2 & 3 (2001)
- Chase/Ennea/Pure Music (2008)
- Chase Live 2010 (2010) (*14)

=== Jim Peterik ===
- Don't Fight the Feeling (1976)
- Rock America (2003) (as co-songwriter)

=== Geoffrey Stoner ===
- Ain't Nothin' Freaky (1976)

=== John Gary ===
- Got To Share This Feeling (1977)

=== Essence ===
(Singles/Epic) (1978)

- Lost Soul (1994)
- Cleveland Rocks (1995)

=== James Ward ===
- Mourning To Dancing (1978)

=== Survivor ===
- Survivor (1979)
- Greatest Hits (2003)
- Ultimate Survivor (2004)
- Survivor Prime Cuts Classic Tracks (1998)
- Survivor (Rock Candy re-issue with "Rebel Girl") (2010)

=== Software ===
- Marbles (1981)

=== Vic Damone ===
- I Just Called To Say I Love You (1985)
- Greatest Love Songs (2008)

=== Bill Ruppert ===
- Guitar on the Edge (1991)

=== .38 Special (as co-songwriter) ===
- Rockin' into the Night (1980)
- Flashback: The Best of .38 Special (1987)
- Live at Sturgis (1999)
- 20th Century Masters – The Millennium Collection: The Best of 38 Special (2000)
- Extended Versions (2000)
- Anthology (2001)
- The Very Best of the A&M Years (2003)
- Live with Van Zandt (2005)
- Best Shots (2006)
- Authorized Bootleg (2010)
- Icon (2011)

=== The Outlaws (as co-songwriter) ===
- Los Hombres Malos (1982)
- The Heritage Collection (2000)
