= Back Where You Belong =

1983 single by 38 Special

Single by 38 Special

from the album Tour de Force
- B-side: "Undercover Lover"
- Released: 1983
- Recorded: 1983
- Studio: Studio One
- Genre: Hard rock; southern rock
- Length: 4:29
- Label: A&M
- Songwriter: Gary O'Connor
- Producers: Rodney Mills; Don Barnes; Jeff Carlisi

38 Special singles chronology
"If I'd Been the One" (1983)	"Back Where You Belong" (1983)	"One Time for Old Times" (1984)

Music video
- "Back Where You Belong" on YouTube

"Back Where You Belong" is a song by American rock band 38 Special and the second single from their sixth studio album Tour de Force (1983).

== Composition ==
"Back Where You Belong" is a Southern rock song that combines guitars and keyboards in the instrumental. Lyrically, it is about the singer's wish for a lover who has left them to return and reconcile with them.

== Critical reception ==
Bret Adams of AllMusic regarded "Back Where You Belong" as "more of a straightforward pop/rock song" than "If I'd Been the One", another track from Tour de Force. Skip Anderson of Classic Rock History wrote that Rodney Mills' "production expertise helped craft the song's crisp and dynamic sound, highlighting the dual guitar interplay of Don Barnes and Jeff Carlisi, along with the robust rhythm section provided by bassist Larry Junstrom and drummer Steve Brookins. The track is driven by a powerful guitar riff and a hook-laden chorus that effectively captures the band's energetic style. The interplay between the guitars, keyboards, and strong vocal harmonies sets it apart, providing an infectious blend that is both Southern and arena rock at its core." He additionally remarked, "The sentimentality in the lyrics is balanced by the upbeat tempo and rock-driven arrangement, making it both a reflective and invigorating listening experience."

== Charts ==
Chart (1984)	Peak position
US Billboard Hot 100	20
US Mainstream Rock (Billboard)	4
