= Tour de Force (38 Special album) =

Studio album by 38 Special
- Released: November 22, 1983
- Recorded: 1983
- Studio: Studio One (Doraville, Georgia)
- Genres: Hard rock; southern rock
- Length: 36:42
- Label: A&M
- Producers: Don Barnes; Jeff Carlisi; Rodney Mills

38 Special chronology
Special Forces (1982)	Tour de Force (1983)	Strength in Numbers (1986)

Professional ratings
Review scores
Source	Rating
Allmusic	3/5 stars

Tour de Force is the sixth studio album by the southern rock band 38 Special, released in 1983. Music videos were made for the three tracks "If I'd Been the One", "Back Where You Belong", and "One Time for Old Times", with the latter two featuring the band portraying detectives who are, humorously, trying to find a missing woman in a light-hearted homage to the TV drama Hill Street Blues.

== Track listing ==
1. "If I'd Been the One" (Don Barnes, Jeff Carlisi, Larry Steele, Donnie Van Zant) – 3:55
2. "Back Where You Belong" (Gary O'Connor) – 4:29
3. "One Time for Old Times" (O'Connor) – 4:32
4. "See Me in Your Eyes" (Barnes, Carlisi, Steele) – 3:54
5. "Twentieth Century Fox" (Barnes, Carlisi, Steele, Van Zant) – 3:45
6. "Long Distance Affair" (Barnes, Steele, Van Zant) – 3:56
7. "I Oughta Let Go" (Steve Diamond, Troy Seals, Eddie Setser) – 3:59
8. "One of the Lonely Ones" (Barnes, Steele, Van Zant) – 4:01
9. "Undercover Lover" (Carlisi, Steele, Van Zant) – 4:11

== Personnel ==
=== .38 Special ===
- Don Barnes – guitars, lead vocals (1, 2, 4–6, 8), backing vocals
- Donnie Van Zant – lead vocals (3, 5, 7, 9), backing vocals
- Jeff Carlisi – guitars, steel guitar
- Larry Junstrom – bass
- Steve Brookins – drums
- Jack Grondin – drums

=== Additional musicians ===
- Steve McRay – keyboards
- Jimmy Markham – harmonica
- Carol Bristow – backing vocals
- Lu Moss – backing vocals

== Production ==
- Don Barnes – co-producer
- Jeff Carlisi – co-producer
- Rodney Mills – producer, engineer
- Ric Saunders – engineer
- Bob Ludwig – mastering
- A&M Mastering Studios (Hollywood, California) – mastering location
- Mark Spector – management, direction
- Larry Steele – stage manager
- Chuck Beeson – art direction, design
- Norman Moore – art direction, design
- Harrison Funk – inner sleeve photography
- Steve Prezant – front cover photography

== Charts ==
Chart (1983–84)	Peak position
Canada Top Albums/CDs (RPM)	53
US Billboard 200	22

== Certifications ==
Region	Certification	Certified units/sales
Canada (Music Canada)	Gold	50,000^{^}
United States (RIAA)	Platinum	1,000,000^{^}
^{^} Shipments figures based on certification alone.
