= A Wild-Eyed Christmas Night =

Studio album by 38 Special
- Released: September 25, 2001
- Studios: Olivia's Castle (Atlanta, Georgia)
- Genres: Christmas, Southern rock
- Length: 36:36
- Label: CMC International
- Producers: Don Barnes, Danny Chauncey

38 Special chronology
Live at Sturgis (1999)	A Wild-Eyed Christmas Night (2001)	Drivetrain (2004)

Professional ratings
Review scores
Source	Rating
AllMusic	2.5/5 stars

A Wild-Eyed Christmas Night is the eleventh studio album by the southern rock band 38 Special, released in 2001.

== Track listing ==
1. "Jingle Bell Rock" (Joe Beal, Jim Boothe) – 2:20
2. "Here Comes Santa Claus" (Gene Autry, Oakley Haldeman) – 2:17
3. "The Little Drummer Boy" (Katherine Davis, Henry Onorati, Harry Simeone) – 3:52
4. "Hallelujah, It's Christmas!" (Don Barnes, Danny Chauncey, Donnie Van Zant) – 4:02
5. "It's Christmas and I Miss You" (Don Barnes, Jim Peterik) – 4:03
6. "A Wild-Eyed Christmas Night" (Jim Peterik) – 4:04
7. "That Old Rockin Chair" (Danny Chauncey, Donnie Van Zant) – 4:01
8. "Santa Claus Is Back in Town" (Jerry Leiber, Mike Stoller) – 3:37
9. "O Holy Night" (Traditional) – 5:28
10. "God Rest Ye Merry, Gentlemen" (Traditional) – 2:52

== Personnel ==
.38 Special

- Don Barnes – vocals, guitars, mandolin
- Bobby Capps – keyboards, vocals
- Danny Chauncey – keyboards, guitars
- Larry Junstrom – bass guitar
- Gary Moffatt – drums
- Donnie Van Zant – vocals

Additional musicians

- Scott Meeder – additional drums, programming

=== Production ===
- Don Barnes – producer, additional engineer
- Danny Chauncey – producer, engineer, mixing
- Bobby Capps – additional engineer
- Ben Fowler – additional mixing
- Brian Foraker – mastering at Brian Foraker Mastering (Nashville, Tennessee)
- Sonny King – cover artwork
- Greenlight Designs – album packaging
- Glen Rose – photography
- Vector Management – management
