= Barry Dunaway =

American bass guitarist

Barry Dunaway is an American rock bassist, vocalist, and composer. His professional music career dates back to his early 1970s roles in groups Cheyenne and Bittersweet, and he performed with bands fronted by artists Pat Travers, Joe Lynn Turner, and Yngwie Malmsteen in the 1980s. Dunaway has played bass guitar in the band 38 Special since 2013.

== Early life ==
Dunaway was born to James Melvin Dunaway and Irma May Provost, both of whom served in the United States Coast Guard. At the age of 15 Dunaway played with his brother Don Oja-Dunaway in the bands Cheyenne and Bittersweet, performing at local venues like Raven Gallery and Bistro. Dunaway and his brother Don eventually formed the band Chuffa with their sister Sharon on vocals and keyboards. Separately from his family, Dunaway played bass guitar in the Atlanta folk rock group Silverman at age 17.

== Career ==
=== 1970s ===
In 1974, Dunaway joined the Dawson Boys, a country rock music band based in Atlanta and fronted by Ed and Bob Dawson. Dunaway played bass guitar on the group’s 1976 album These Summer Nights. Writing for the Columbia Record, Pat Berman noted “folk, pop, blues and occasional jazz” influences in the songs on the effort. Dunaway also played with the Atlanta, Georgia rock group Magic Cat in the late 1970s.

=== 1980–1999 ===
In 1980, Dunaway joined the Atlanta band Whiteface, replacing their previous bassist Kyle Henderson. He helped write some songs on their 1981 sophomore album Change of Face on Mercury Records. The same year, Dunaway recorded on Paul Davis’ album Cool Night on Arista Records before going on to perform with the band Bareback, also formed by Whiteface cofounder Doug Bare.

Dunaway was playing with Warner Records-signed band Riggs in 1982 when he and Riggs founder Jerry Riggs joined the band of rock musician Pat Travers. Dunaway contributed to Travers' 1984 album Hot Shot on Polydor Records as well as recording the band’s live album King Biscuit Flower Hour. During the mid-1980s, he also toured with Rainbow frontman Joe Lynn Turner in support of his 1985 album Rescue You, and he appeared alongside the rest of Turner’s band in the 1986 film Blue de Ville starring Jennifer Runyon.

Dunaway began playing with Yngwie Malmsteen in 1988. In conversation with Modern Drummer, drummer Anders Johansson credited Dunaway with helping steer Malmsteen’s classical-inspired style of heavy metal in a more practical direction for a rock band. Dunaway also recorded on numerous of Malmsteen’s albums, including Trial by Fire: Live in Leningrad in 1989, Facing the Animal in 1997, the 1998 effort Live!!, and 1999's Alchemy.

Dunaway joined the band Saraya as bassist for their album When The Blackbird Sings…, which came out on Polydor Records in 1991. He also performed and recorded with St. Augustine band Kingpins’ 1999 album Kings and Things.

=== 2000s ===
In 2004-06 Dunaway played bass for the band Survivor, contributing to their 2006 album Reach. Toward the end of the 2000s, he performed with the band Rock and Pop Masters, which included rotating libe up of one-time members of bands like Survivor, Elton John, Loverboy, John Cafferty & The Beaver Brown Band, Santana, Edgar Winter, Atlanta Rhythm Section, The Young Rascals, Deep Purple, Sass Jordan, Kool & The Gang, Hall & Oates and Orleans. Around the same time, he took the stage at Rock & Pop Masters, a band whose rotating lineup featured former Foreigner and Ambrosia members. He also played with the supergroup Voices of Classic Rock, featuring singers from Loverboy, Deep Purple, Toto and Jefferson Starship.

=== With 38 Special ===
Dunaway was recruited to play bass for the rock band 38 Special by founding member Don Barnes, who knew of Dunaway because of his involvement with Rock & Pop Masters. In conversation with former MTV video jockey Alan Hunter, Dunaway said that he initially filled in for Larry Junstrom while he had knee surgery in 2011 but then joined the band full time by 2013.

Barnes has said that Dunaway has helped reinvigorate 38 Special, which has been active since 1977 despite lineup changes over the years. Dunaway still performs with the band as of 2025, making it his longest stint as bassist with a single group.

== Discography ==
Dawson Boys

- These Summer Nights (1976)

Bob Bakert

- Bob Bakert (1977)

Paul Davis

- Cool Night (1981)

Ed Raetzloff

- Drivin Wheels (1981)

Whiteface

- Change Of Face (1981)

James Anderson

- Strangest Feeling (1982)

Major Lance

- The Major's Back (1983)

Pat Travers

- Hot Shot (1984)
- School of Hard Knocks (1989)
- King Biscuit Flower Hour (1997)
- From the Front Row Live (2001)
- Le Concert du Siecle (2001)

Yngwie J. Malmsteen's Rising Force

- Odyssey Tour (1988)
- Alchemy (1999)
- Lost In A Dream (2007)
- First Odyssey (2007)
- Now Your Ships Are Burned: The Polydor Years 1984-1990 (2004)

Yngwie Malmsteen

- Trial By Fire: Live In Leningrad (1989)
- The Yngwie Malmsteen Collection (1991)
- Facing The Animal (1997)
- Live!! (1998)
- Anthology 1994-1999 (2000)
- Yngwie Malmsteen Archives (2000)
- Instrumental Best Album (2003)
- Far Beyond the Sun (2005)
- Complete Box Polydor Years (2006)

Saraya

- When The Blackbird Sings (1991)

Jacob Armen

- Drum Fever (1995)

Mark Boals

- Ignition (1998)

Big Jim & The Twins

- Yeah... We Smoke (1998)

Kingpins

- Kings and Things (1999)

The Voices Of Classic Rock

- Hard Rock Hotel Universal Orlando (First Birthday Bash 2002) (2002)

Jamie DeFrates

- Winterhawk (2006)

Survivor

- Reach (2006)

Joe Lynn Turner

- Street of Dreams: Boston 1985 (2007)

Rock & Pop Masters

- One Night in Weston – a live concert CD (2008)

David Watt Besley

- Believe These Eyes (2011)

38 Special

- Milestone (2025)

== Filmography ==
- Pat Travers – “Killer” Music Video (1984)
- Pat Travers – “Women on the Edge of Love” Music Video (1984)
- Pat Travers – “Just Another Killer Day” Music Video (1985)
- Blue de Ville (1986)
- Yngwie Malmsteen – “Spanish Castle Magic” Music Video (1989)
- Yngwie Malmsteen’s Rising Force – “Hangar 18, Area 51” Music Video (1999)
- Rock & Pop Masters – One Night in Weston (2008)
