= Rock & Roll Strategy =

Studio album by 38 Special
- Released: 1988
- Recorded: 1987–1988
- Genre: Southern rock
- Length: 50:58
- Label: A&M
- Producer: Rodney Mills

38 Special chronology
Flashback: The Best of 38 Special (1987)	Rock & Roll Strategy (1988)	Bone Against Steel (1991)

Professional ratings
Review scores
Source	Rating
AllMusic	2/5 stars
The Rolling Stone Album Guide	2/5 stars

Rock & Roll Strategy single cover

Rock & Roll Strategy is the eighth studio album by the southern rock band 38 Special, released in 1988. It was their final album for long-time label A&M Records. The album contained the group's last top 10 hit, "Second Chance", which peaked at No. 6 on the Billboard Hot 100 singles chart. The title track was also released as a lead single.

== Production ==
The album was the first with vocalist and keyboard player Max Carl, who wrote "Little Sheba", about women wrestling in jello.

== Track listing ==
Comin' Down Tonight cover

1. "Rock & Roll Strategy" (Max Carl, Donnie Van Zant) – 4:34
2. "What's It to Ya?" (Robert White Johnson, Michael Lunn, Van Zant) – 4:30
3. "Little Sheba" (Carl) – 4:54
4. "Comin' Down Tonight" (Carl, Jeff Carlisi, Johnson, Van Zant) – 4:26
5. "Midnight Magic" (Mark Baker, Carlisi, Cal Curtis, Johnson, Van Zant) – 4:21
6. "Second Chance" (Carl, Carlisi, Curtis) – 5:04
7. "Hot 'Lanta" (Carl) – 5:42
8. "Never Be Lonely" (Carl, Danny Chauncey) – 4:39
9. "Chattahoochee" (Johnson, Lunn, Van Zant) – 4:11
10. "Innocent Eyes" (Carl, Carlisi, Chauncey) – 4:17
11. "Love Strikes" (Carlisi, Johnson, Van Zant) – 4:31

== Personnel ==
.38 Special

- Max Carl – keyboards, lead vocals (1, 3, 4, 6–8, 10) background vocals
- Donnie Van Zant – lead vocals (2, 5, 7, 9, 11) background vocals
- Jeff Carlisi – guitars, steel guitar
- Danny Chauncey – guitars
- Larry Junstrom – bass
- Jack Grondin – drums

Additional musicians

- James Stroud – Synclavier programming, LinnDrum programming
- Robert White Johnson – percussion, backing vocals
- Edd Miller – percussion, vibraslap
- The Noise Gator – horns
- The Six Groomers (the band) – backing vocals

Production

- Rodney Mills – producer, engineer, mixing
- Edd Miller – engineer, mixing
- Thom "TK" Kidd – mix assistant
- Bob Ludwig – mastering
- Mark Rogers – production coordination
- Norman Moore – art direction, design
- Chris Cuffaro – photography

Studios

- Recorded at Soundscape Studios (Atlanta, Georgia)
- Mixed at Cheshire Recording Studios (Atlanta, Georgia)
- Mastered at Masterdisk (New York City, New York)

== Charts ==
=== Album ===
Chart (1988)	Peak position
US Billboard 200	61

=== Single ===
Chart (1988)	Peak position
US Billboard Hot 100	67
US Mainstream Rock (Billboard)	5
