= You Keep Runnin' Away =

1982 single by 38 Special

Single by 38 Special

from the album Special Forces
- B-side: "Prisoners of Rock 'n' Roll"
- Released: 1982
- Recorded: 1981
- Studio: Studio One
- Genre: Southern rock
- Length: 3:56
- Label: A&M
- Songwriters: Don Barnes; Jeff Carlisi; Jim Peterik
- Producers: Rodney Mills; Barnes; Carlisi

38 Special singles chronology
"Caught Up in You" (1982)	"You Keep Runnin' Away" (1982)	"Chain Lightnin'" (1982)

Music video
- "You Keep Runnin' Away" on YouTube

"You Keep Runnin' Away" is a song by American rock band 38 Special and the second single from their fifth studio album Special Forces (1982).

== Critical reception ==
Mark Coleman of Rolling Stone considered the song one of the few "minor delights" from the compilation album Flashback: The Best of 38 Special. Mike DeGagne of AllMusic had a favorable reaction toward the song for its chorus and "well-proportioned rhythms".

== Charts ==
Chart (1982)	Peak position
US Billboard Hot 100	38
US Mainstream Rock (Billboard)	7
