= Second Chance (38 Special song) =

1989 single by 38 Special

Single by 38 Special

from the album Rock & Roll Strategy
- B-side: "Comin' Down Tonight"
- Released: 1989
- Length: 5:04 (album version); 4:33 (single version)
- Label: A&M
- Songwriters: Max Carl; Jeff Carlisi; Cal Curtis
- Producer: Rodney Mills

38 Special singles chronology
"Rock & Roll Strategy" (1988)	"Second Chance" (1989)	"Comin' Down Tonight" (1989)

"Second Chance" is a song by American rock band 38 Special from their eighth studio album, Rock & Roll Strategy (1988). Written by keyboardist Max Carl, guitarist Jeff Carlisi, and Cal Curtis, it was released as the album's second single, becoming the band's highest-charting song in the United States, peaking at No. 6 on the Billboard Hot 100. This song, of which Carl was the lead vocalist, showcases a stylistic departure from their signature Southern rock sound.

== Background and composition ==
"Second Chance" began as a song written by Jeff Carlisi and Cal Curtis in 1983 entitled "I Never Wanted Anyone Else But You," which was only recorded as a demo; according to Carlisi, 38 Special's original frontman Don Barnes didn't feel that it was really a 38 Special song." When Max Carl replaced Don Barnes in 38 Special in 1988, Carlisi played the demo of "I Never Wanted Anyone Else But You" for Carl who remarked that "the guy in the song sounded like a real jerk"; Carlisi's reply: "yeah, but a lot of people have been through this and want forgiveness" and Carl's response: "yeah, maybe the guy needs a second chance" led to the song's being reworked with a new lyric: "A heart needs a second chance" as its main hook line.

Carlisi said, "I think lyrically what [original lyricist] Cal [Curtis] sketched out was brilliant, but the real thing that touches people is that one simple phrase 'a heart needs a second chance.' No one had said it like that before and that's what makes a great song...[Carl] really brought it home and had such a marvellous voice. I mean, the guy could sing 'Mary Had a Little Lamb' and you'd go buy it, he was so good. He really sold that song."

== Release and reception ==
"Second Chance" entered the US Billboard Hot 100 singles chart at No. 78 in February 1989 and peaked at No. 6 that May. It also peaked at No. 2 on the Billboard Album Rock Tracks chart and became the band's first No. 1 single on the Billboard Adult Contemporary chart, on which it was the most successful song of 1989. Worldwide, the single peaked at No. 2 in Canada and No. 14 in Australia.

Despite "Second Chance"'s affording 38 Special an apparent breakthrough hit, it was not enough to improve the lackluster sales of Rock & Roll Strategy and A&M Records did not renew the band's contract. The group's next album, Bone Against Steel, was released on Charisma Records in 1991. Although "Second Chance" remains 38 Special's top career record, Carlisi said in 2009, "To this day when the name 38 Special comes up nobody says 'Second Chance'! It was our biggest hit but people always think of 'Hold On Loosely' or 'Caught Up in You' first."

== Other versions ==
Jamaican reggae singer Dennis Brown's take on the song appears on various 1990s dancehall compilation albums. Tongan-American Jawaiian trio Kontiki covered it on their 2008 album Free Again.

== Track listing ==
'7-inch and CD singles

1. "Second Chance" (Carl, Carlisi, Curtis) – 4:33
2. "Comin' Down Tonight" (Carl, Carlisi, Johnson, Van Zant) – 4:25

== Charts ==
=== Weekly charts ===
Chart (1989)	Peak position
Australia (ARIA)	14
Canada Top Singles (RPM)	2
US Billboard Hot 100	6
US Adult Contemporary (Billboard)	1
US Album Rock Tracks (Billboard)	2
US CHR (Radio & Records)	6

=== Year-end charts ===
Chart (1989)	Position
Australia (ARIA)	96
Canada Top Singles (RPM)	30
US Billboard Hot 100	63
US Adult Contemporary (Billboard)	1
