= Strength in Numbers (38 Special album) =

Studio album by 38 Special
- Released: April 28, 1986
- Recorded: 1985
- Studio: Goodnight LA Studios and Sutton Place (Van Nuys, California).
- Genre: Southern rock, pop rock
- Length: 39:09
- Label: A&M
- Producer: Keith Olsen

38 Special chronology
Tour de Force (1983)	Strength in Numbers (1986)	Flashback: The Best of 38 Special (1987)

Professional ratings
Review scores
Source	Rating
Allmusic	2/5 stars

'Somebody Like You' single album

Strength in Numbers is the seventh studio album by the southern rock band 38 Special, released in 1986. This album was the last one to feature the founding member and co-frontman Don Barnes, until he rejoined the band in 1992. "Somebody Like You" was released as the second single from the album.

== Track listing ==
1. "Somebody Like You" (Don Barnes, Jeff Carlisi, Larry Steele, Donnie Van Zant, Jim Vallance) – 4:08
2. "Like No Other Night" (Barnes, Carlisi, Vallance, John Bettis) – 3:59
3. "Last Time" (Barnes, Carlisi, Vallance) – 3:36
4. "Once in a Lifetime" (Barnes, Vallance) – 3:39
5. "Just a Little Love" (Carlisi, Barnes, Bettis, Gary O'Connor) – 3:34
6. "Has There Ever Been a Good Goodbye" (Barnes, Carlisi, Steele, Vallance, Bettis) – 3:55
7. "One in a Million" (Barnes, Carlisi, Vallance) – 3:49
8. "Heart's on Fire" (Barnes, Carlisi, Van Zant, Bettis) – 4:15
9. "Against the Night" (Barnes, Van Zant, Bettis, Sam Bryant, Greg Redding) – 3:34
10. "Never Give an Inch" (Van Zant, Bryant, Roy Freeland) – 4:56

== Personnel ==
=== .38 Special ===
- Don Barnes – guitars, lead vocals, backing vocals
- Donnie Van Zant – backing vocals, lead vocals (9, 10)
- Jeff Carlisi – guitars, steel guitar
- Larry Junstrom – bass
- Steve Brookins – drums
- Jack Grondin – drums

=== Additional musicians ===
- Bill Cuomo – keyboards
- Mike Porcaro – bass
- Denny Carmassi – drums
- Jim Vallance – drums
- Jerry Peterson – saxophone
- Earl Lon Price – saxophone
- Nick Lane – trombone
- Michael Cichowicz – trumpet
- Carol Bristow – backing vocals
- Tom Kelly – backing vocals

== Production ==
- Keith Olsen – producer, engineer
- Brian Foraker – engineer
- Greg Fulginiti – mastering
- Artisan Sound Recorders
- Norman Moore – art direction, design
- Dennis Keeley – photography
- Mark Spector – management
- Joni Gosney – management

== Charts ==
Chart (1986)	Peak position
US Billboard 200	17

For 'Somebody Like You':

Chart (1986)	Peak position
US Billboard Hot 100	48
US Mainstream Rock (Billboard)	6

== Certifications ==
Region	Certification	Certified units/sales
United States (RIAA)	Gold	500,000^{^}
^{^} Shipments figures based on certification alone.
