= Love Strikes =

Love Strikes may refer to:

- "Love Strikes", a song by 38 Special in the album Rock & Roll Strategy
- Love Strikes, an album by Eskobar
- Moteki, also known as Love Strikes!, a comic by Mitsurou Kubo and its TV and cinema adaptation
- "Love Strikes", a song by Katharine McPhee in the album Hysteria
