= Greasy Grapes =

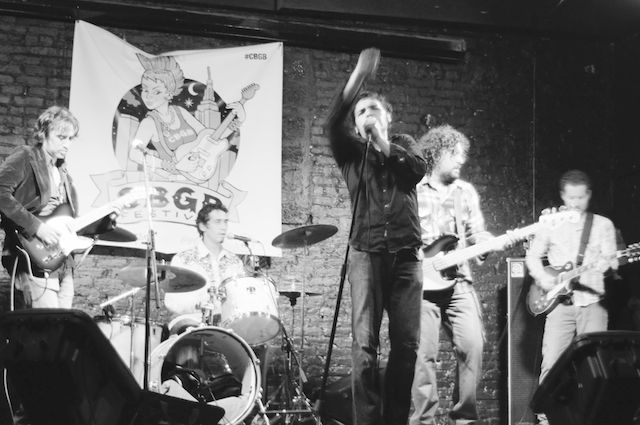
- Greasy Grapes performing live at CBGB Fest 2013 NYC.

Background information
- Origin: Caracas, Venezuela
- Genres: Rock n roll, roots rock, blues rock,
- Years active: 2006–present
- Label: None
- Members: Antonio Romero; Leo Laya; Alberto Márquez; Rafael Márquez
- Past members: José Miguel Bermudez (vocals); Luifer Guirados (guitar); Jesús Dávila (drums)
- Website: www.greasygrapes.com

Greasy Grapes is a rock & roll band from Caracas, Venezuela, formed in 2006 by Antonio Romero (guitar), Leo Laya (vocals), Alberto Márquez (bass) and Rafael Márquez (drums). The band is primarily influenced by southern rock bands from the Deep South of the US, and were described by Al Borde, a US-based Latin alternative media company, as "Southern Rock bastard seeds... planted at Caribbean shores" ("bastardas de bandas de Southern Rock... plantadas a la orilla del Caribe.").

== History ==
The work of Greasy Grapes is deeply influenced by American traditional music, and through the years they have earned the respect of legendary southern rock musicians like Henry Paul (The Outlaws) and Barry Dunaway (Pat Travers, Yngwie Malmsteen, Foghat). After years of touring in their native Venezuela, they participated as the only southern rock band at the 2013 CBGB Fest in New York City, sharing the stage with artists like Ginger Baker (Cream), Lisa Loeb, Jakob Dylan, and My Morning Jacket, among many others.

Greasy Grapes has independently released two albums, At the Back of the Hill (2009) and Headed South (2012), in addition to the Lengua Madre EP (2013). All three projects are rooted in an eclectic blend of vintage rock, soul, blues and country sounds. The first two albums were recorded by Francisco Domingo at True Digital Studios and Taller de Arte Sonoro. They have worked with Grammy awarded and nominated artists like Bob Katz, Erik Aldrey, and Mauricio Arcas (Maurimix) from Los Amigos Invisibles.

Greasy Grapes has received international press coverage in the United States, Japan, Italy, and Germany.

== Members ==
- Antonio Romero (guitar)
- Leo Laya (vocals)
- Alberto Márquez (bass)
- Rafael Márquez (drums)

=== Former members ===
- José Miguel Bermudez (lead vocalist)
- Luifer Guirados (guitar)
- Jesús Dávila (drums)

== Discography ==
=== Albums ===
- At The Back Of The Hill (2009)
- Headed South (2012)

=== Extended plays ===
- Lengua Madre (2013)
