= Special Forces (38 Special album) =

Studio album by 38 Special
- Released: 1982
- Recorded: 1981
- Studios: Studio One; Doraville, Georgia
- Genres: Southern rock; pop rock; hard rock
- Length: 39:57
- Label: A&M
- Producers: Don Barnes; Jeff Carlisi; Rodney Mills

38 Special chronology
| Wild-Eyed Southern Boys (1981) | Special Forces (1982) | Tour de Force (1983) |

Professional ratings
Review scores
| Source | Rating |
|---|---|
| AllMusic | 4.5/5 stars |
| The Rolling Stone Album Guide | 2.5/5 stars |

Special Forces is the fifth studio album by American rock band 38 Special, released in 1982 by A&M Records. The band embarked on the Special Forces Tour to support the album.

Special Forces peaked at number 10 on the Billboard Top LPs & Tape chart, making it the band's highest-charting studio album in the United States. Three of the four charted singles from the album were co-written with Survivor's Jim Peterik, including "Caught Up in You", the band's first top-ten hit on the Billboard Hot 100. A remastered CD, with three live bonus tracks, was reissued by Rock Candy Records in September 2023.

== Track listing ==
1. "Caught Up in You" (Don Barnes, Jeff Carlisi, Jim Peterik) - 4:37
2. "Back Door Stranger" (Carlisi, Larry Steele, Donnie Van Zant) - 4:38
3. "Back on the Track" (Carlisi, Steele, Van Zant) - 4:45
4. "Chain Lightnin'" (Barnes, Peterik, Van Zant) - 5:01
5. "Rough-Housin'" (Barnes, Steele, Van Zant) - 4:08
6. "You Keep Runnin' Away" (Barnes, Carlisi, Peterik) - 3:56
7. "Breakin' Loose" (Carlisi, Jack Grondin, Steele, Van Zant) - 3:32
8. "Take 'Em Out" (Barnes, Carlisi, Steele, Van Zant) - 4:07
9. "Firestarter" (Barnes, Steele, Van Zant) - 5:01

== Personnel ==
- Donnie Van Zant - lead vocals (2, 3, 5, 7, 8, 9), backing vocals
- Don Barnes - guitar; lead vocals on tracks 1, 4, 5, 6, 8; backing vocals
- Jeff Carlisi - guitar, steel guitar
- Larry Junstrom - bass guitar
- Steve Brookins - drums
- Jack Grondin - drums

Additional personnel

- Terry Emery - percussion, piano
- Steve McRay - keyboards
- Jimmy Barnes - harmonica, harp
- Carol Bristow - vocals, backing vocals
- Lu Moss - vocals, backing vocals

Production

- Producers: Don Barnes, Jeff Carlisi, Rodney Mills
- Engineers: Rodney Mills, Greg Quesnel
- Art direction: Jeffrey Kent Ayeroff
- Design: Philip Gips
- Cover art concept: Philip Gips
- Cover art painting: Larry Gerber
- Mastering: Bob Ludwig

== Charts ==
| Chart (1982) | Peak position |
|---|---|
| Canada Top Albums/CDs (RPM) | 40 |
| US Billboard 200 | 10 |

== Certifications ==
| Region | Certification | Certified units/sales |
|---|---|---|
| United States (RIAA) | Platinum | 1,000,000^{^} |
^{^} Shipments figures based on certification alone.
