= Drivetrain (album) =

Studio album by 38 Special
- Released: July 24, 2004
- Genre: Southern rock; hard rock
- Length: 55:02
- Label: Sanctuary
- Producer: Don Barnes, Danny Chauncey

38 Special chronology
A Wild-Eyed Christmas Night (1999)	Drivetrain (2004)	38 Special Live From Texas (2011)

Drivetrain is the twelfth studio album by the southern rock band 38 Special, released in 2004.

Eight of the album's 12 songs were co-written by long-time collaborator Jim Peterik.

Bridge Bash in The Miami Herald praised the album's intentions of capturing the sound of a live performance, commenting that the group's music has "never sounded so powerful and 'in your face'".

== Track listing ==
1. "Something I Need" (Don Barnes, Jim Peterik) – 3:57
2. "Hurts Like Love" (Barnes, Danny Chauncey, Peterik) – 4:40
3. "Haley's Got a Harley" (Barnes, Peterik, Donnie Van Zant, Johnny Van Zant) – 4:02
4. "Jam On" (Barnes, Chauncey, Peterik) – 4:56
5. "Make Some Sense of It" (Barnes, Peterik) – 4:39
6. "Quick Fix" (Peterik, D. Van Zant) – 3:55
7. "The Squeeze" (Barnes, Jeff Carlisi, Chauncey, D. Van Zant, Robert White Johnson) – 5:03
8. "The Play" (Barnes, Chauncey, Gary Moffatt) – 5:12
9. "Bad Looks Good on You" (Barnes, Chauncey, Andrew Ramsey) – 5:01
10. "Trooper with an Attitude" (Barnes) – 3:26
11. "Hiding from Yourself" (Peterik, D. Van Zant) – 5:04
12. "Sheriff's County Line" (Barnes, Peterik, D. Van Zant, J. Van Zant) – 5:07

== Soundtracks ==
The album was used in the Broken Lizard movie Super Troopers with "Trooper with an Attitude" as an introduction for the movie.

== Personnel ==
- Don Barnes – lead and rhythm guitars, lead and background vocals
- Bobby Capps – keyboards, background vocals
- Danny Chauncey – lead and rhythm guitars, keyboards
- Larry Junstrom – bass guitar
- Gary Moffatt – drums
- Donnie Van Zant – lead and background vocals, rhythm and acoustic guitars
- Greg Morrow – drums & percussion
- Marke "Jellyroll" Burgstahler – slide guitar, additional guitar solos

== Production ==
- Producers: Don Barnes, Danny Chauncey
- Engineers: Danny Chauncey, Ben Strano, Alan Yates
- Digital editing: Don Barnes, Bobby Capps, Danny Chauncey
- Mixing: Joe Hardy
- Mastering: Don Cobb
- Design: Traci Goudie
- Photography: Traci Goudie
