= If I'd Been the One =

1983 single by 38 Special

Single by 38 Special

from the album Tour de Force
- B-side: "Twentieth Century Fox"
- Released: 1983
- Recorded: 1983
- Studio: Studio One
- Genre: Hard rock; southern rock
- Length: 3:55
- Label: A&M
- Songwriters: Don Barnes; Jeff Carlisi; Larry Steele; Donnie Van Zant
- Producers: Rodney Mills; Barnes; Carlisi

38 Special singles chronology
"Chain Lightnin'" (1982)	"If I'd Been the One" (1983)	"Back Where You Belong" (1983)

Music video
- "If I'd Been the One" on YouTube

"If I'd Been the One" is a song by American rock band 38 Special and the lead single from their sixth studio album Tour de Force (1983).

== Critical reception ==
Bret Adams of AllMusic called the song a "stunner steeped in passionate vocals and simple but highly effective rhythm and lead guitar parts."

== Charts ==
Chart (1983–1984)	Peak position
Canada (Canadian Hot 100)	49
US Billboard Hot 100	19
US Mainstream Rock (Billboard)	1
