= Mark Weiss =

American rock music photographer

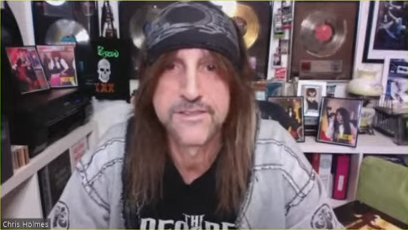
Weiss in 2020

Mark Weiss is an American rock music photographer. His most widely recognized photographs capture the look and aesthetic of music and celebrity personalities of the 1980s. His work with publications such as Circus magazine and FACES helped establish Mark "Weissguy" Weiss as a name known for rock photography. He has photographed a wide range of acts including Ozzy Osbourne, Bon Jovi, the Rolling Stones, Kiss, Madonna and Wu Tang Clan.

== Early life ==
Mark Weiss grew up in a middle-class family in Matawan, New Jersey, where his mother worked in public relations and his father was a door-to-door salesman. At the age of thirteen, he acquired a Bell & Howell Canon FP camera from a neighbor in exchange for lawn mowing services. This early experience with photography, nurtured by a crash course in developing film at his school, laid the foundation for his career in rock music photography.

== Career ==
=== Beginnings ===
As a teenager, Weiss photographed live concerts without permission, and sold prints of his photographs to fans of the performers. In 1977 he was arrested for selling pictures of the band Kiss at one of their Madison Square Garden concerts in New York. His first nationally published work was a photograph of Aerosmith's Steven Tyler; a centerfold in the June 1978 issue of Circus. Soon thereafter, Weiss was hired as their staff photographer.

=== 1980s ===
Weiss quickly developed relationships with musicians and their managers, and became immersed in the burgeoning rock scene. He played an active role in creating the visual imagery of heavy metal and glam rock, as these styles of music began to gain radio airplay, eventually topping the charts and packing stadiums worldwide. Major acts and record labels contracted Weiss for photography and art direction, and many albums to which he contributed went on to multi-platinum sales. Weiss became tour photographer for numerous artists of the era, including Ozzy Osbourne, Bon Jovi, Mötley Crüe, Poison, Metallica, Twisted Sister and others. His material is also syndicated internationally in books, magazines, and licensed merchandising.

== Influence ==
=== Musicians ===
Weiss has been credited with introducing Sebastian Bach to the band Skid Row. Bach's memorable performance at Weiss' wedding caught the notice of guitarist Dave Sabo, who consequently sent Bach a video of his band Skid Row performing, and arranged an audition. The band went on to make two multi-platinum selling albums with Bach as lead vocalist.

Weiss is also responsible for introducing guitarist Zakk Wylde to Ozzy Osbourne. Upon discovering him through recommendation from Dave "face" Feld, Weiss gave Ozzy and Sharon Osbourne a tape recording and photograph of Wylde. As a family friend of the Osbournes, and trusted long-time photographer of Ozzy, Weiss recommended the then teen-aged Wylde to take the lead guitarist role recently vacated by Jake E. Lee. The Osbournes called Zakk, still living with his parents at the time, and arranged to fly him to Los Angeles and join Ozzy's band.

== Famous Weiss photographs ==
- 1984 Twisted Sister, Stay Hungry album cover
- 1986 Bon Jovi, Slippery When Wet album cover
- 1994 Bon Jovi, Dry County single cover
- 1998 Lynyrd Skynyrd, Lyve from Steel Town
- 1999 38 Special, Live at Sturgis album cover
- 1999 Dokken, Erase the Slate album cover
- 2000 Christina Aguilera, Mi Reflejo album cover
- 2001 Bon Jovi, One Wild Night Live 1985–2001 album cover
- 2002 Natural, Let Me Count the Ways single cover
- 2002 Kelly Osbourne, Shut Up album cover
- 2003 Slayer, War at the Warfield DVD cover
- 2007 Gwen Stefani, The Sweet Escape single cover
