= 38 Special (album) =

Studio album by 38 Special
- Released: May 1977
- Recorded: 1977
- Genres: Rock, boogie rock, blues rock
- Length: 40:52
- Label: A&M
- Producer: Dan Hartman

38 Special chronology
38 Special (1977)	Special Delivery (1978)

Professional ratings
Review scores
Source	Rating
AllMusic	2/5 stars
Christgau's Record Guide	D+

38 Special is the debut studio album by American rock band 38 Special, released in 1977 by A&M Records. It was remastered and reissued on the Lemon record label in 2003. Two singles, "Long Time Gone" (A&M 1946-S) and "Tell Everybody" (A&M 1964-S), were released, but neither charted on the Billboard Hot 100.

"Around and Around" is a cover of a 1958 song by Chuck Berry.

== Track listing ==
All tracks are written by Don Barnes, Jeff Carlisi, and Donnie Van Zant; except where noted.

No.	Title	Writer(s)	Length
1.	"Long Time Gone"	Barnes, Carlisi, Ken Lyons, Van Zant	4:02
2.	"Fly Away"	Barnes, Carlisi, Lyons, Van Zant	5:15
3.	"Around and Around"	Chuck Berry	3:27
4.	"Play a Simple Song"	Carlisi, Van Zant	3:24
5.	"Gypsy Belle"		4:58
6.	"Four Wheels"		4:41
7.	"Tell Everybody"	Barnes, Van Zant	4:09
8.	"Just Hang On"		5:00
9.	"Just Wanna Rock & Roll"		5:56

== Personnel ==
=== 38 Special ===
- Donnie Van Zant – lead vocals
- Don Barnes – guitars, backing vocals
- Jeff Carlisi – guitars, pedal steel guitar, dobro
- Ken Lyons – bass
- Steve Brookins – drums, percussion
- Jack Grondin – drums

=== Additional personnel ===
- Terry Emery – acoustic piano
- Dan Hartman – acoustic piano (2)
- Larry Junstrom – bass (2)
- Jocelyn Brown – backing vocals (2, 7, 8)
- Lani Groves – backing vocals (2, 7, 8)
- Carl Hall – backing vocals (2, 7, 8)

== Production ==
- Dan Hartman – producer
- Dave Still – engineer and mixing at The Schoolhouse (Westport, Connecticut)
- Greg Calbi – mastering at Sterling Sound (New York City, New York)
- Roland Young – art direction
- Junie Osaki – album design
- Stan Evenson – logo design
- Larry Dupont – hand tinting
- Neil Selkirk – photography

== Charts ==
Chart (1977)	Peak position
US Billboard 200	148
