= Wild-Eyed Southern Boys =

Studio album by 38 Special
- Released: January 3, 1981
- Recorded: September 1979 – July 1980
- Studios: Studio One; Doraville, Georgia
- Genres: Southern rock; pop rock; hard rock
- Length: 39:30
- Label: A&M
- Producer: Rodney Mills

38 Special chronology
Rockin' into the Night (1979)	Wild-Eyed Southern Boys (1981)	Special Forces (1982)

Wild-Eyed Southern Boys is the fourth studio album by American Southern rock band 38 Special, released on January 3, 1981, by A&M Records. The album spawned the hit single "Hold On Loosely", which remains a staple track of classic rock, as well as the group's discography. The album reached No. 23 on the Canadian charts. A remastered CD, with four bonus live tracks, was reissued by Rock Candy Records in September 2023.

Professional ratings
Review scores
Source	Rating
AllMusic	4.5/5 stars
The Rolling Stone Album Guide	2.5/5 stars

== Track listing ==
No.	Title	Writer(s)	Length
1.	"Hold On Loosely"	Don Barnes, Jim Peterik, Jeff Carlisi	4:39
2.	"First Time Around"	Barnes, Carlisi, Larry Steele, Donnie Van Zant	3:59
3.	"Wild-Eyed Southern Boys"	Peterik	4:18
4.	"Back Alley Sally"	Carlisi, Van Zant	3:11
5.	"Fantasy Girl"	Carlisi, Peterik	4:06
6.	"Hittin' and Runnin'"	Barnes, Peterik	4:55
7.	"Honky Tonk Dancer"	Barnes, Steele, Van Zant	4:59
8.	"Throw Out the Line"	Barnes, Carlisi, Van Zant	3:45
9.	"Bring It On"	Carlisi, Steele, Van Zant	5:38
Total length:			39:30

== Personnel ==
- Donnie Van Zant – lead vocals (2–4, 7–9), backing vocals
- Don Barnes – rhythm and lead guitar, piano (3), lead vocals (1, 3, 5, 6), backing vocals
- Jeff Carlisi – lead and rhythm guitar, steel guitar
- Larry Junstrom – bass
- Steve Brookins – drums
- Jack Grondin – drums

Additional personnel

- Steve McRay – piano (4, 6, 7)
- Terry Emery – percussion
- Carol Bristow – backing vocals
- Lu Moss – backing vocals
- Carol Veto – backing vocals

Production

- Rodney Mills – producer, engineer
- Greg Quesnel – engineer
- Bob Ludwig – mastering at Masterdisk (New York City, New York)
- Chuck Beeson – art direction, design
- Mick McGinty – illustrations
- Willardson & White, Inc. – illustrations
- Paddy Reynolds – sleeve photography

== Charts ==
Chart (1981)	Peak position
Canada Top Albums/CDs (RPM)	23
US Billboard 200	18

== Certifications ==
Region	Certification	Certified units/sales
United States (RIAA)	Platinum	1,000,000^{^}
^{^} Shipments figures based on certification alone.
