= Special Delivery (38 Special album) =

Studio album by 38 Special
- Released: March 1978
- Recorded: January–February 1978
- Studios: The Schoolhouse (Westport, Connecticut); The Hit Factory (New York, New York)
- Genres: Southern rock; hard rock
- Length: 33:00
- Label: A&M
- Producer: Dan Hartman

38 Special chronology
38 Special (1977)	Special Delivery (1978)	Rockin' into the Night (1979)

Professional ratings
Review scores
Source	Rating
AllMusic	3/5 stars
The Rolling Stone Album Guide	2/5 stars

Special Delivery is the second studio album by the American rock band 38 Special, released in 1978. Neon Park was responsible for the album's artwork.

== Track listing ==
Song timings taken from original LP label.

Side one

1. "I'm a Fool for You" (John Cascella) – 2:55
2. "Turnin' to You" (Don Barnes, Jeff Carlisi) – 4:03
3. "Travelin' Man" (Barnes, Carlisi, Donnie Van Zant) – 4:19
4. "I Been a Mover" (Carlisi, Van Zant) – 4:25

Side two

1. "What Can I Do?" (Barnes, Van Zant) – 4:29
2. "Who's Been Messin'" (Barnes, Carlisi, Van Zant, Dan Hartman) – 4:16
3. "Can't Keep a Good Man Down" (Barnes, Van Zant, Larry Junstrom) – 3:18
4. "Take Me Back" (Barnes, Van Zant) – 5:15

== Personnel ==
38 Special

- Donnie Van Zant – lead vocals
- Don Barnes – electric guitar, 12-string acoustic guitar, backing vocals
- Jeff Carlisi – acoustic guitar, electric guitar, slide guitar
- Larry Junstrom – bass guitar
- Steve Brookins – drums
- Jack Grondin – drums

Additional personnel

- Billy Powell – acoustic piano (1, 8)
- Edgar Winter – saxophone solo (7), saxophone arrangements (7)
- Louise Bethune – backing vocals
- Carl Hall – backing vocals
- Dale Krantz – backing vocals

Production

- Dan Hartman – producer, mixing (2–8)
- Dave Still – engineer, mixing (2–8)
- Kevin Herron – mixing (1)
- Ted Spencer – mix assistant
- Greg Calbi – mastering at Sterling Sound (New York City, New York)
- Roland Young – art direction
- Junie Osaki – design
- Neon Park – illustration
- Mark Hanauer – photography
