= Drivetrain (disambiguation) =

Drivetrain may refer to:

- Drivetrain, the group of components in a motor vehicle that deliver power to the driving wheels. This excludes the engine or motor that generates the power.
  - Bicycle drivetrain systems, used to transmit power on bicycles or other human-powered vehicles from the rider to the drive wheels
- Drivetrain Systems International, an Australian drivetrain constructor
- Drivetrain (album), a 2004 album by 38 Special
