= Rockin' into the Night =

Studio album by 38 Special
- Released: October 3, 1979
- Recorded: 1979
- Studio: Studio One (Doraville, Georgia)
- Genre: Southern rock; rock
- Length: 38:29
- Label: A&M
- Producer: Rodney Mills

38 Special chronology
Special Delivery (1978)	Rockin' into the Night (1979)	Wild-Eyed Southern Boys (1981)

Rockin' into the Night is the third studio album by the Southern rock band 38 Special, released in 1979.

The title track, written by three members of Survivor, became the band's first big hit (peaking at No. 43 during a nine-week run on the Billboard Hot 100 singles chart), and marked the first of many songs Jim Peterik would write for and with the band.

"Money Honey" is a cover of a 1953 song by Clyde McPhatter and the Drifters.

== Critical reception ==
Professional ratings
Review scores
Source	Rating
AllMusic	2.5/5 stars
The Rolling Stone Album Guide	2.5/5 stars

The Santa Cruz Sentinel noted that parts of the album "slip into a dense, wallowing series of undistinguished rock tunes."

== Track listing ==
1. "Rockin' into the Night" (Jim Peterik, Gary Smith, Frankie Sullivan) – 3:58
2. "Stone Cold Believer" (Don Barnes, Jeff Carlisi, Donnie Van Zant, Larry Junstrom) – 4:11
3. "Take Me Through the Night" (Barnes, Van Zant) – 4:10
4. "Money Honey" (Jesse Stone) – 3:10
5. "The Love That I've Lost" (Barnes) – 4:34
6. "You're the Captain" (Carlisi, Van Zant) – 4:24
7. "Robin Hood" (Barnes, Carlisi) – 4:40
8. "You Got the Deal" (Barnes, Van Zant) – 4:50
9. "Turn It On" (Carlisi, Van Zant) – 4:34

== Personnel ==
38 Special

- Donnie Van Zant – lead vocals (2, 3, 4, 6, 9), backing vocals
- Don Barnes – acoustic guitars, electric guitars, lead vocals (1, 5, 8), backing vocals
- Jeff Carlisi – electric guitars, slide guitar
- Larry Junstrom – bass
- Steve Brookins – drums, percussion
- Jack Grondin – drums, percussion

Additional personnel

- Terry Emery – acoustic piano (2, 5)
- Billy Powell – acoustic piano (3, 4, 6, 9)
- Dale Krantz – backing vocals, harmony vocals in "Money Honey"

Production

- Rodney Mills – producer, engineer
- Greg "Fern" Quesnel – assistant engineer
- Bob Ludwig – mastering at Masterdisk (New York City, New York)
- Roland Young – art direction
- Chuck Beeson – cover design concept, album design, photography
- Michael John Bowen – cover design concept
- Jeff Carlisi – cover design concept
- Mark Hanauer – photography

== Charts ==
Chart (1980)	Peak position
US Billboard 200	57
