= Jimmie Lee Sloas =

American bass player, producer and songwriter (born 1959)

- Born: November 11, 1959 (age 66); Sandy Hook, Kentucky, U.S.
- Genres: Contemporary Christian; country; pop rock; thrash metal
- Occupation: Bassist
- Years active: 1982–present

Jimmie Lee Sloas is an American session musician, producer, and songwriter, who plays bass.

== History ==
Jimmie Lee Sloas, born in Ashland, Kentucky, grew up in Fairborn, Ohio and Isonville, Kentucky. His father, Dave, was a member of the popular bluegrass group, The Sloas Brothers. His older brother, David, served as Tammy Wynette's lead guitarist from the early 1980s until her death.

In 1982, Sloas co-founded, with singer-songwriter Robert White Johnson, the album-oriented rock band RPM. The band released two albums between 1982 and 1984, with the albums produced by Brent Maher and Gary Langan, respectively.

From 1986 to 1990, Sloas was a member of the contemporary Christian vocal band The Imperials (as lead singer and sometimes bass player). He holds several session musician and production credits, primarily in country & contemporary Christian music with artists such as Garth Brooks, Carrie Underwood, Keith Urban, Carman, LeAnn Rimes, Kellie Pickler, Reba McEntire, PFR, Bob Seger, Switchfoot, and Jessica Simpson. In 1996, he co-founded the group Dogs of Peace with former Whiteheart guitarist Gordon Kennedy. Sloas also recorded with the thrash metal band Megadeth on their album The System Has Failed. He was nominated for Top Bass Player of the Year in the 2006, 2008, and 2009 Academy of Country Music awards.
