= Whistling in the Dark (album) =

Studio album by Max Gronenthal
- Released: 1979
- Genre: Pop/rock
- Label: Chrysalis
- Producer: Michael James Jackson

Max Gronenthal chronology
'''Whistling in the Dark''' (1979)	Max (1980)

Whistling in the Dark, released in 1979, is the first studio album released by Max Gronenthal, also known as Max Carl.

== Track listing ==
Sources:

1. "Sailfish"
2. "Still I Wonder"
3. "You"
4. "Lookin' For A Girl"
5. "Get It Straight"
6. "I Know You're In There"
7. "Sonya"
8. "I Can't Leave The City"
9. "All The Time"
10. "Faded Satin Lady" (Tommy Bolin & Max Gronenthal)

== Personnel ==
- Will McFarlane - guitar
- Gerard McMahon - vocals
- Bill Meeker - drums
- Michael O'Neill - guitar
- Bruce Steinberg - cover design
- Trey Thompson - bass guitar
- Patrick Simmons - vocals
- Tim Goodman - guitar
- Rocke Grace - vocals
- Max Gronenthal - keyboards, vocals
- Michael James Jackson - producer
- Kenny Loggins - vocals
- Michael McDonald - vocals
- James Newton Howard - synthesizer
