= Scott Hoffman =

American rock drummer (born 1961)

Scott Hoffman (born October 10, 1961, in Fort Myers, Florida) is an American rock drummer. He is best known for his years playing with Southern rock band 38 Special, from 1992 to 1997.

Hoffman graduated from Berklee College of Music in 1983 with a Bachelor of Music degree in Audio Recording.

Hoffman's professional career began in high school as a percussionist with the Miami Beach Symphony Orchestra. Over the years, Hoffman's career has spanned musical genres as he has played for 38 Special, O-Town, Down Time, Chris Hicks Band (Marshall Tucker Band & The Outlaws), Brian Howe (Bad Company), Johnny No Name a.k.a. AJ McLean (Backstreet Boys), and Mindi Abair. Additionally, Hoffman has played drums with James Taylor (subbing for Steve Gadd) and Jerry Douglas (subbing for Doug Belote).

Since 2003, Scott has been the drum tech for Steve Gadd (James Taylor and Paul Simon).
