= RPM (American band) =

American Band

- Origin: Los Angeles, United States
- Genres: Pop rock
- Years active: 1982-1984
- Labels: EMI America; Warner
- Members: Robert White Johnson; Jimmie Lee Sloas; Mark Gendel; Tommy Wells
- Website: RPM website

RPM was an American band who had released two albums during the 1980s. RPM's first album was a self-titled album released by EMI America Records in 1982 and included the AOR hit "A Legend Never Dies". Eventually, the band was invited to perform for KLOL's "Rockfest" at the Astrodome Complex in Houston, Texas.

The band's second album, Phonogenic, was released by Warner Bros. Records in 1984. A video was produced for the track, "Man Overboard". The album did not have any hits as Warner was promoting other albums at the time such as 1984 by Van Halen, Eliminator by ZZ Top, and Purple Rain by Prince.

== Discography ==
- RPM (1982) (EMI America Records)
- Phonogenic (1984) (Warner Bros. Records)
