= Jerry Riggs =

American rock guitarist

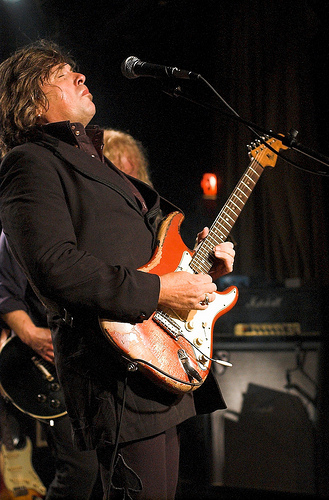

Background information
- Born: Knoxville, Tennessee, U.S.
- Instrument: Guitar

Jerry Riggs is an American rock guitarist and vocalist.

== Biography ==
Riggs began his musical career as lead guitarist for the Knoxville, Tennessee group Lynx, a bar band in the mid-1970s. The band, featuring Michael Byassee on vocals, soon relocated to Atlanta. There musician Don Train ("Stormtrooper") recruited Riggs and fellow guitarist Jeremy Graf to join his group "Raggedy Ann". The band recorded a series of demos at Last Stand Studios in 1978. By 1979, the band was being courted by major producers and new demo tapes were cut in Lookout Mountain, Tennessee resulting in new management and recording deals.

When Don Train elected to leave the group and returned to Philadelphia in 1980, Jerry Riggs replaced him as frontman, and the band became known as Riggs. Two of the band's songs, "Radar Rider" and "Heartbeat", appear in the 1981 animated feature film Heavy Metal. The songs were performed by Jerry Riggs, Jeremy Graf, Dave Ridarick, and Steve Carlisle. The songs were also included on the movie's soundtrack release. Riggs' self-titled debut album on the Full Moon label was released shortly after that but failed to make much of an impact on the music scene. One song, "Ready Or Not", was a minor hit, but the album otherwise went unnoticed, and the band split up. "Ready Or Not" and "Take It Off" were heard in the movie Night Shift, directed by Ron Howard and starring Henry Winkler, Michael Keaton, and Shelley Long.

Riggs began working with Canadian rocker Pat Travers in 1983, and joined the Pat Travers Band as a co-lead guitarist. At the time Riggs joined, Travers was at the end of his most successful period in recording and touring. The band became a staple on North American nightclub circuits during the latter half of the 1980s and constantly toured. At headlining shows, Riggs performed at least one of his original songs, and "Ready Or Not" was always a crowd favorite. He also showcased his skills with a very memorable guitar solo. A few of Riggs' original compositions made it onto Travers' 1990 release School Of Hard Knocks. One Riggs-penned track was an instrumental entitled Guitars From Hell, which features Travers and Riggs on guitar. Riggs also appears in the 1991 video release Boom Boom-Live At The Diamond Club, a concert filmed in Toronto which features Travers' greatest hits, as well as "Ready Or Not" by Riggs. Riggs' guitar solo was not included.

Riggs left Travers' group in 1993 and lives in Florida where he plays with various supergroups. The band Riggs has reunited for occasional one night engagements, most recently on November 28, 2009, playing at The Loft in Atlanta. Riggs started touring as a lead guitarist with 38 Special in 2019.
