= Max Carl =

American songwriter

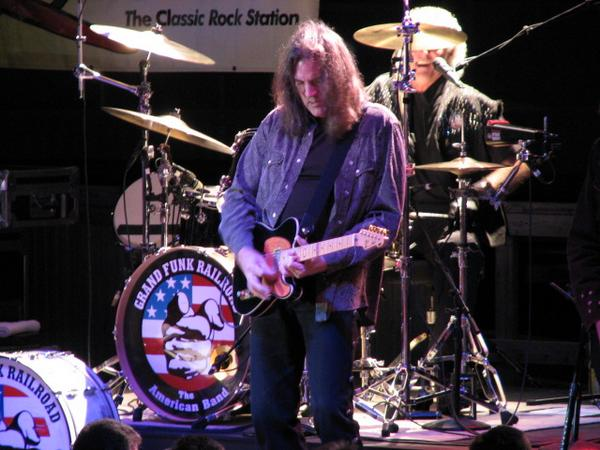
- Carl performing with Grand Funk Railroad in 2010

Background information
- Also known as: Max Carl
- Born: Max Carl Gronenthal; January 29, 1950 (age 76); Humphrey, Nebraska, U.S.
- Genres: Rock, pop
- Occupations: Singer, musician
- Instruments: Vocals, keyboards, guitar, saxophone, harmonica
- Years active: 1968–present
- Label: Various
- Website: www.grandfunkrailroad.com/bios/Max_bio.html

Max Carl Gronenthal (born January 29, 1950) is an American rock singer, keyboardist, guitarist and songwriter. He is the co-lead singer of the classic rock band Grand Funk Railroad. In addition, he spent several years as the keyboardist and lead singer for the southern rock band 38 Special. Carl is known for having co-written and sung lead vocals on 38 Special's hit song, "Second Chance" (1989).

== Early life ==
Carl was born in 1950 in Platte Center, Nebraska, United States, and raised near the town of Humphrey, graduating from high school in Norfolk, Nebraska in 1968.

== Music career ==
=== Early career ===
Throughout 1968–69, Carl played a significant role as a member of the Norfolk-based New Breed Blues Band, during which time he enhanced his interest in rhythm and blues music. Beginning as a saxophonist in this band, he later became the lead vocalist/keyboardist in the group. However, in 1969, he left the band to join the Lincoln-based Chancellors.

During the 1970s, Carl served stints with numerous bands across the Midwest, including The Fabulous Flippers out of Lawrence, Kansas, pausing briefly in 1976 to study piano and refine and improve his songwriting abilities in Oklahoma City. He frequently performed with fellow Midwesterner Tommy Bolin in various jazz/rock fusion groups. By the late-1970s, Carl had graduated to performing on albums by "bigger names," such as Rod Stewart and Dusty Springfield.

Around this time, Carl decided to begin recording as a solo artist. His debut album, Whistling in the Dark was released in 1979 under his given name, Max Gronenthal.

=== 1980s ===
Carl released a second solo album, Max, in 1980.

Throughout the 1980s, Carl immersed himself in session work, singing and/or playing on albums by artists such as Elton John, Dan Fogelberg, Bonnie Raitt, Don Henley, Glenn Frey, Timothy B. Schmit, Bette Midler, and Kenny Loggins. In 1982, he also formed what started as a 1960s R&B cover band, eventually named Jack Mack and the Heart Attack. Featuring a four-piece horn section, the band played classic R&B, Soul and also incorporated some Max Carl-penned original R&B-styled songs into their repertoire, including the classic "Cardiac Party". Their Thursday night residency at the Club Lingerie in Hollywood was legendary. After Max Carl left the band, Jack Mack was no longer a cover band. It became the house band of Fox TV's The Late Show, and appeared in many TV shows and movies, including the cult classic, Tuff Turf.

In addition to performing, Carl also found time during the mid-1980s to compose tunes for various movie soundtracks, performing on many of them as well. Films such as Spring Break (1983), Police Academy (1984), Grandview, U.S.A. (1984), Tuff Turf (1985), and Doin' Time (1985) include his compositions. In 1986, he would co-write "Come and Follow Me" as a duet with Marcy Levy (Marcella Detroit), which played during the closing credits of the movie Short Circuit. He also performed the theme song to the 1987 animated series Spiral Zone.

Meanwhile, in 1984, Carl left Jack Mack and the Heart Attack to record his third solo album. Unlike the first two solo albums, The Circle would be released under his stage name Max Carl. The album's title track would be included on the soundtrack for the John Hughes film Weird Science. Later that same year, Carl was invited to join 38 Special, a request that he eventually accepted.

Carl rehearsed with the band frequently, and by 1988, he joined forces with the southern rock stylings of 38 Special. That year, the band would release the Rock & Roll Strategy album, which included the Cal Curtis/Jeff Carlisi tune that Carl reworked (earning him an additional writing credit) from his personal experience into "Second Chance," featuring Carl on lead vocals. "Second Chance" introduced 38 Special into a whole new market when it reached the top of the US Hot Adult Contemporary chart in early 1989.

=== 1990s ===
Carl remained in 38 Special into the 1990s, but left shortly after the release of the band's Bone Against Steel album in 1991.

At this point, Carl moved to Nashville, where he continued to write/perform on tunes for the likes of Joe Cocker, Bad Company, Richard Marx, and Charlie Daniels. Later in the 1990s, he became fascinated with a "family" of musicians in Mississippi who performed a very original historical and heartland-infused brand of music. Relocating to Mississippi, Carl began performing with this group of musicians, forming what would become Max Carl and the Big Dance. This experience ultimately culminated in the release of the album One Planet – One Groove (under the Max Carl and the Big Dance moniker) in 1998. Featured on this album are several of Carl's original compositions fused with this new "southern funk"/"Mississippi sound," as well as covers of various 60s hits done in this style.

=== Later career ===
Carl is involved in the Speed Channel's grassroots drag racing competition Pinks franchise. He is the composer and performer of the theme music as well as transitional music throughout the show. Through this endeavor, he has released a CD soundtrack for the show entitled Max Carl: Fuel, produced by Max & Steve Music, LLC.

== Solo discography ==
=== As "Max Gronenthal" ===
- Whistling in the Dark (1979)
- Max (1980)

=== As "Max Carl" ===
- Circle (1985)

=== Max Carl and the Big Dance ===
- One Planet – One Groove (1998)
