= Caught Up in You =

Single by 38 Special

from the album Special Forces
- B-side: "Firestarter"
- Released: April 19, 1982
- Recorded: 1981
- Genre: Rock
- Length: 4:37 (single version); 3:55 (video version)
- Label: A&M
- Songwriters: Don Barnes; Jeff Carlisi; Jim Peterik; Frankie Sullivan
- Producer: Rodney Mills

38 Special singles chronology
| "Wild-Eyed Southern Boys" (1981) | "Caught Up in You" (1982) | "You Keep Runnin' Away" (1982) |

Music video
- "Caught Up in You" on YouTube

"Caught Up in You" is a song by American Southern rock band 38 Special. It was the first single released from their 1982 studio album Special Forces and their first No. 1 on the US Billboard Top Tracks rock chart. It became one of the band's two top 10 pop hits, reaching No. 10 on the US Billboard Hot 100. Their other top 10 single, "Second Chance", reached No. 6 in 1989. The song also went top 10 in Canada, peaking at No. 9 on the RPM singles chart. Don Barnes sang lead vocals on the song.

The song can be heard at the end of the Squidbillies episode "Burned and Reburned Again".

== Track listing ==
US 7" single

1. "Caught Up in You" – 4:37
2. "Firestarter" – 5:01

== Personnel ==
- Don Barnes – rhythm guitar, lead vocals
- Donnie Van Zant – backing vocals
- Jeff Carlisi – lead guitar
- Larry Junstrom – bass
- Steve Brookins – drums
- Jack Grondin – drums

== Charts ==
=== Weekly charts ===
| Chart (1982) | Peak position |
|---|---|
| Canadian RPM Top Singles | 9 |
| U.S. Billboard Hot 100 | 10 |
| U.S. Top Rock Tracks (Billboard) | 1 |
| U.S. Cash Box Top 100 | 9 |
| U.S. Radio & Records CHR/Pop Airplay Chart | 6 |

=== Year-end charts ===
| Chart (1982-1983) | Rank |
|---|---|
| Canada | 75 |
| U.S. Billboard Hot 100 | 53 |
| U.S. Cash Box | 64 |

== See also ==
- List of Billboard Mainstream Rock number-one songs of the 1980s
