= Rockin' into the Night (song) =

Single by 38 Special

from the album Rockin' into the Night
- Released: 1980
- Genre: Rock
- Length: 3:58
- Label: A&M
- Songwriters: Gary Smith; Frank Sullivan; Jim Peterik
- Producer: Rodney Mills

38 Special singles chronology
"Tell Everybody" (1977)	"Rockin' into the Night" (1980)	"Hold On Loosely" (1981)

"Rockin' into the Night" is a song by American band 38 Special. Written by Gary Smith, Frank Sullivan and Jim Peterik of Survivor, it is the title song of 38 Special's third album, Rockin' into the Night (1979). The song reached number 43 on the Billboard Hot 100. Don Barnes sang lead vocals on the song.

== History ==
The song was written by Survivor members Gary Smith, Frankie Sullivan and Jim Peterik, for their band to perform on their first album, Survivor. Producer Ron Nevison felt the song was not right for the record, and the rough mix was given to 38 Special's manager, Mark Spector. The band re-recorded the tune and became 38 Special's first hit.
