= Gary O' =

Canadian rock singer

Gary O'Connor
- Born: Gary O'Connor
- Genre: rock
- Occupation: Singer
- Instrument: Vocals
- Years active: 1960s-present

Gary O'Connor, better known as Gary O', is a Canadian rock singer and songwriter. He is best known for the singles "Pay You Back with Interest" and "All the Young Heroes", which were popular in the early 1980s, and for receiving a Juno Award nomination for Most Promising Male Vocalist at the Juno Awards of 1982. He wrote the 38 Special song, "Back Where You Belong", which reached number 20 on the Billboard Hot 100 charts in 1983.

== Biography ==
The son of jazz musician Billy O'Connor, he was a member of the bands The Synics and The Spasstiks in the 1960s before the latter band changed its name to Cat in 1968. Cat had a popular Canadian hit in 1970 called "We're In This Together", but broke up by 1972 due to creative differences. O'Connor then performed with a Beatles tribute band called Liverpool; the band soon released two singles of original material, garnering some radio airplay with "Dolly". Following a name change to Aerial, they released the album In the Middle of the Night in 1978. O'Connor wrote the single "Easy Love", which reached #92 on the Canadian charts.

O'Connor left Aerial after their first album. He subsequently formed the short-lived band Kid Rainbow and became a member of the board of directors of the Toronto Musicians Association. After folding the band, O'Connor adopted the stage name Gary O' and continued as a solo artist. His self-titled debut album was released in 1981 on Capitol Records. The remake of The Hollies' song "Pay You Back With Interest" reached the Billboard Hot 100 Charts, where it peaked at # 70. Also, the singles "I Believe in You" and "All the Young Heroes" would receive a great deal of airplay on both sides of the border.

In 1984, he released his follow-up album Strange Behavior. The first single "Shades of '45", a song about the Enola Gay bombing the Japanese, became a popular hit in Canada, and the follow-up "Get it While You Can" also became a modest hit.

O'Connor has also had some success in writing songs for other artists, including Terri Crawford, 38 Special ("Back Where You Belong", "One Time For Old Times"), Molly Hatchet ("What's It Gonna Take"), Eddie Money ("Maybe Tomorrow"), Kim Stockwood, Billy Newton-Davis and Beverley Mahood.

== Discography ==
=== Aerial ===
- 1978 - In the Middle of the Night
- 1980 - Maneuvres

=== Gary O' ===
Title	Album details	Chart	
Title	Album details	CAN	US Rock
Gary O'	Released: 1981; Label: Capitol	—	22
Strange Behavior	Released: 1984; Label: RCA	96	—

=== Singles ===
Year	Single	Peak chart positions	Album
Year	Single	CAN	Album
1981	"Pay You Back With Interest"	—	Gary O'
1981	"All the Young Heroes"	—	Gary O'
1981	"I Believe in You"	—	Gary O'
1984	"Get It While You Can"	92	Strange Behavior
1985	"Shades of '45"	93	Strange Behavior
1985	"Call of the Wild"	—	Strange Behavior
