= Robert White Johnson =

American songwriter and musician (born c. 1952)

Robert White Johnson (born c. 1952) is an American songwriter and musician, based in Nashville, best known for co-writing "Where Does My Heart Beat Now", which was a major hit for Celine Dion.

== History ==
Robert White Johnson is a native of Moline, Illinois, where he commenced his career as a professional musician, playing drums. He originally went to Nashville at the behest of Dottie West, who was interested in developing Johnson's pop music career. He later became a staff writer for Tree Publishing.

While continuing as a staff writer with Tree Publishing, in 1981, Johnson co-founded, with bass and keyboard player Jimmie Lee Sloas, the rock band RPM, where Johnson was the lead singer. The band released two albums and had a modest AOR hit single, "A Legend Never Dies". The group's albums were produced by Brent Maher and Gary Langan, respectively. After the band folded, Johnson concentrated on his staff songwriting position, before becoming an independent songwriter and producer as of the mid-1990s. He has contributed songs, production or both to such bands as the Beach Boys, Peter Wolf, B.J. Thomas, Lynyrd Skynyrd, 38 Special, Van Zant and Celine Dion. He is also a songwriter and producer of popular Christian music. In 1996, he won a Dove Award as producer of the Inspirational Album of The Year, Unbelievable Love, by Larnelle Harris. Johnson is also a successful writer and performer of jingles.
