= Hold On Loosely =

Single by 38 Special

from the album Wild-Eyed Southern Boys
- B-side: "Throw Out the Line"
- Released: February 11, 1981
- Recorded: 1979–1980
- Genre: Hard rock; power pop; Southern rock
- Length: 4:40 (album version); 3:58 (7" version)
- Label: A&M
- Songwriters: Don Barnes; Jeff Carlisi; Jim Peterik
- Producer: Rodney Mills

38 Special singles chronology
"Stone Cold Believer" (1980)	"Hold On Loosely" (1981)	"Fantasy Girl" (1981)

Music video
- "Hold On Loosely" on YouTube

"Hold On Loosely" is a song by American rock band 38 Special, released by A&M Records on their 1981 studio album Wild-Eyed Southern Boys.

== Release ==
Released as the lead single from the album, the song reached No. 3 on the US Billboard Rock Tracks chart, No. 27 on the US Billboard Hot 100, and No. 32 in Canada. It later appeared on their 1987 compilation album Flashback: The Best of 38 Special and their 1999 live album Live at Sturgis. It was the 13th music video to be played on the day that MTV debuted in 1981. Don Barnes sang lead vocals on the song.

Record World said that "Rip-roarin' guitars slash away at the dual-drum rhythm section while Don Barnes' convincing lead vocal handles the bold hook."

== Origin ==
Barnes, going through a difficult time in his marriage, lamented that his wife was not being more supportive of his career aspirations. He presented a seed idea for a song to co-writer Jim Peterik, asking what he thought of the title "Hold On Loosely", to which Peterik came back with, "...but don't let go". For the music, Peterik described the song's opening riff as "Like the Cars meets Lynyrd Skynyrd or something". Taking inspiration from "Just What I Needed" by the Cars, Jeff Carlisi wrote the famous riff to the song.

== In popular culture ==
The song was used in the comedy films Joe Dirt and Without a Paddle as well as the Better Call Saul episode "Five-O".

== Other versions ==
Davey T Hamilton released a cover of the song on his 2024 EP Southern Rock.
