= Danny Chauncey =

American musician

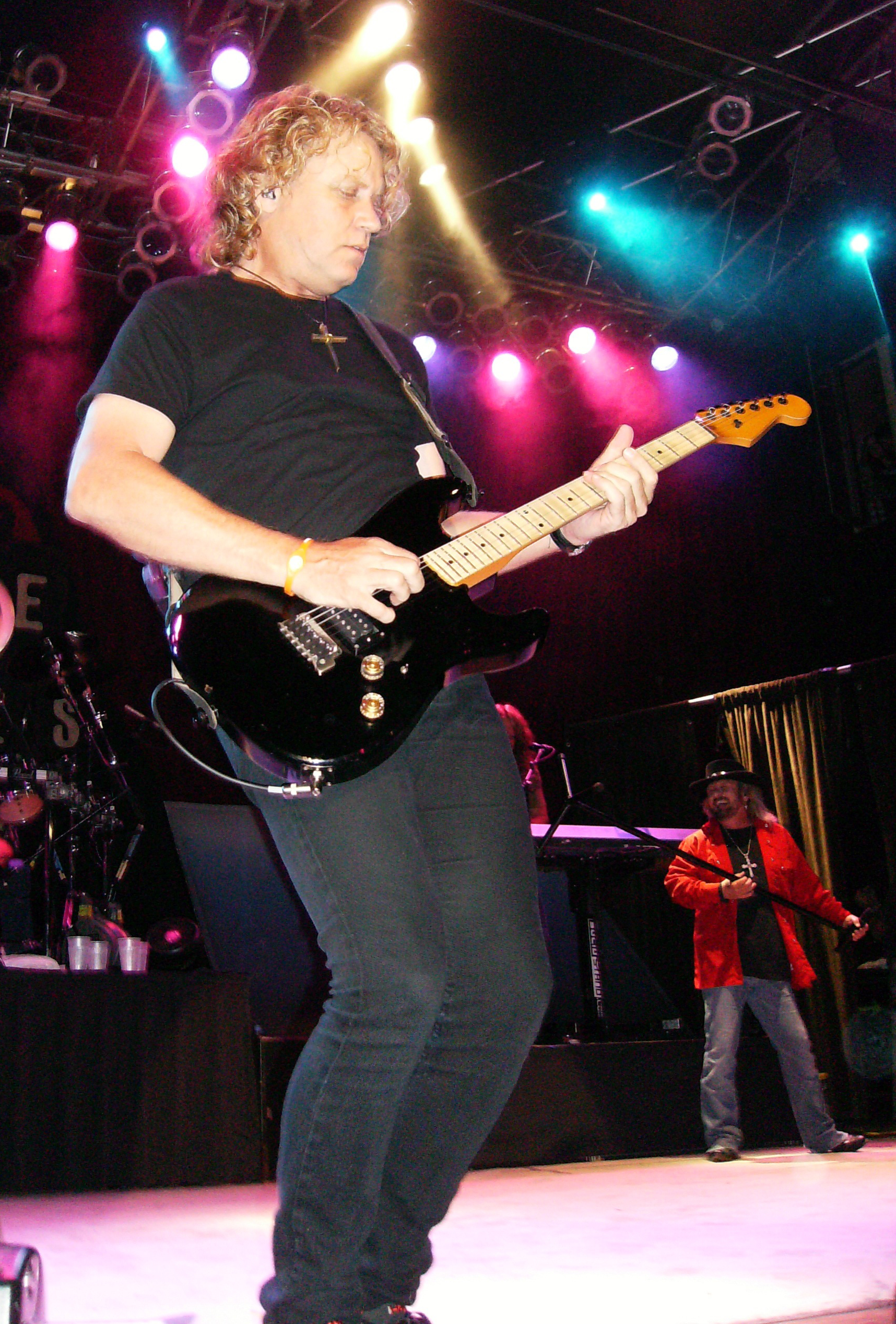
- Chauncey performing in 2011

Background information
- Born: Daniel Smith Chauncey; June 19, 1956 (age 69); San Francisco, California, U.S.
- Genres: Southern rock; hard rock
- Occupations: Songwriter; musician
- Instruments: Guitar; keyboards
- Years active: 1981–present
- Member of: Gregg Allman and Friends
- Formerly of: 38 Special; Billy Satellite; Mistress
- Website: dannychauncey.com

Daniel Smith "Danny" Chauncey (born June 19, 1956) is an American rock guitarist. He is best known for being a member of the Southern rock band 38 Special.

== Background ==
Chauncey was born in San Francisco, California and raised in Alameda County, California. He attended Alameda High School.

He grew up listening to classical music, but however, his musical interests changed when he heard the song "Twist and Shout" by The Beatles. He was then interested in learning to play the guitar, getting his first guitar when he was eight years old. He also learned to play the French horn in high school. Also in high school, he played with several rock bands.

His first instrument was a Stella 6-string cowboy guitar. His first electric was red Gibson SG with a Fender 50w Super Reverb.

== Career ==
In the early-mid-1970s, Chauncey was a member of the Bay Area rock group Mistress, where he plays lead and rhythm guitar. In 1977 the group recorded a self-titled album for RSO Records. The album was released two years later, shortly before Mistress disbanded.

He also played in a side band, the Alameda All-Stars with Brad Gillis and Kelly Keagy who were both in the band Night Ranger.

Chauncey left Mistress to join Billy Satellite. It was with this band that he co-wrote "I Wanna Go Back" which became a hit for Eddie Money. The band was together for several years and recorded an album, Billy Satellite, for Capitol Records.

While in Billy Satellite, he was a studio musician for Taxxi, an English band that played Euro-tech music. He recorded three albums with Taxxi from 1982 to 1985, including States of Emergency, Foreign Tongue, and Expose.

In 1987 after the break up of Billy Satellite, Chauncey joined 38 Special, staying with them through 2019. Chauncey says, "We really hit it off so it felt natural. I was allowed to contribute songwriting from the beginning as 'I Wanna Go Back' was a hit on the charts for Eddie Money around the same time that I joined, so the guys knew I was a capable songwriter."

He recorded many albums with 38 Special, providing vocals and keyboards in addition to guitar. He is also the engineer and producer for some of their albums.

After he left 38 Special, he started playing live shows with Gregg Allman and Friends.
