= 38 Special (band) =

American rock band

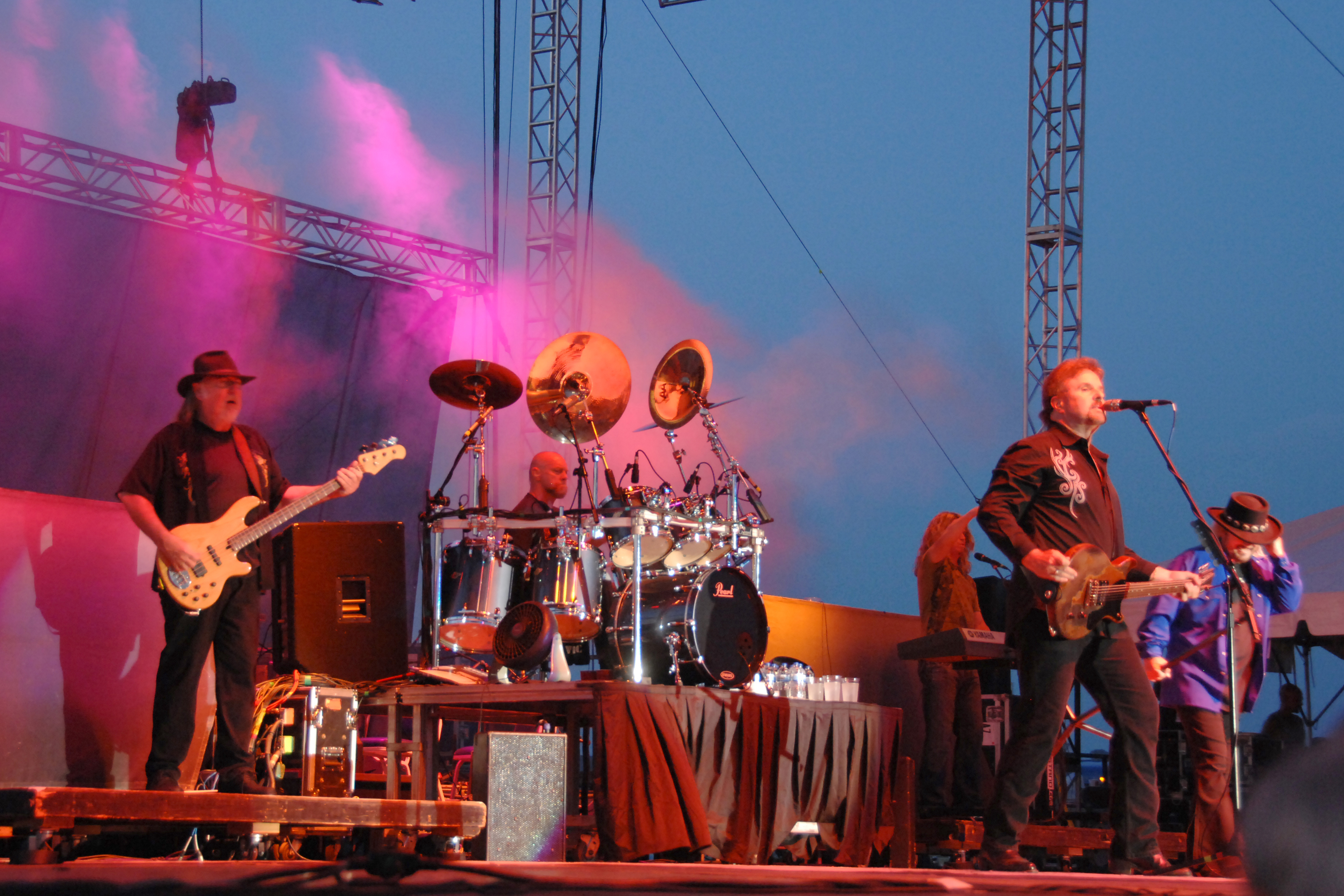
- 38 Special performing at Wright-Patterson Air Force Base near Dayton, Ohio, June 2010

Background information
- Also known as: .38 Special, Thirty-eight Special
- Origin: Jacksonville, Florida, US
- Genres: Southern rock; AOR; hard rock; power pop; boogie rock
- Works: 38 Special discography
- Years active: 1974–present
- Label: A&M
- Members: Don Barnes; Bobby Capps; Gary Moffatt; Barry Dunaway; Jerry Riggs
- Past members: Donnie Van Zant; Jeff Carlisi; Jack Grondin; Steve Brookins; Ken Lyons; Larry Junstrom; Steve McRay; Max Carl; Danny Chauncey; Scott Meeder; Scott Hoffman
- Website: 38special.com

38 Special (sometimes stylized as .38 Special or spelled out as Thirty-eight Special) is an American rock band formed in Jacksonville, Florida, in 1974 by vocalist Donnie Van Zant and guitarist-vocalist Don Barnes.

They are known for their hit songs including "Hold On Loosely" and "Caught Up in You," among various other top 40 hits on the US Billboard Hot 100 during the 1980s and early 1990s. The other songs include "Fantasy Girl", "Rockin' into the Night", "You Keep Runnin' Away", "If I'd Been the One", "Back Where You Belong", "Teacher, Teacher", "Like No Other Night", "Second Chance", and "The Sound of Your Voice".

== History ==
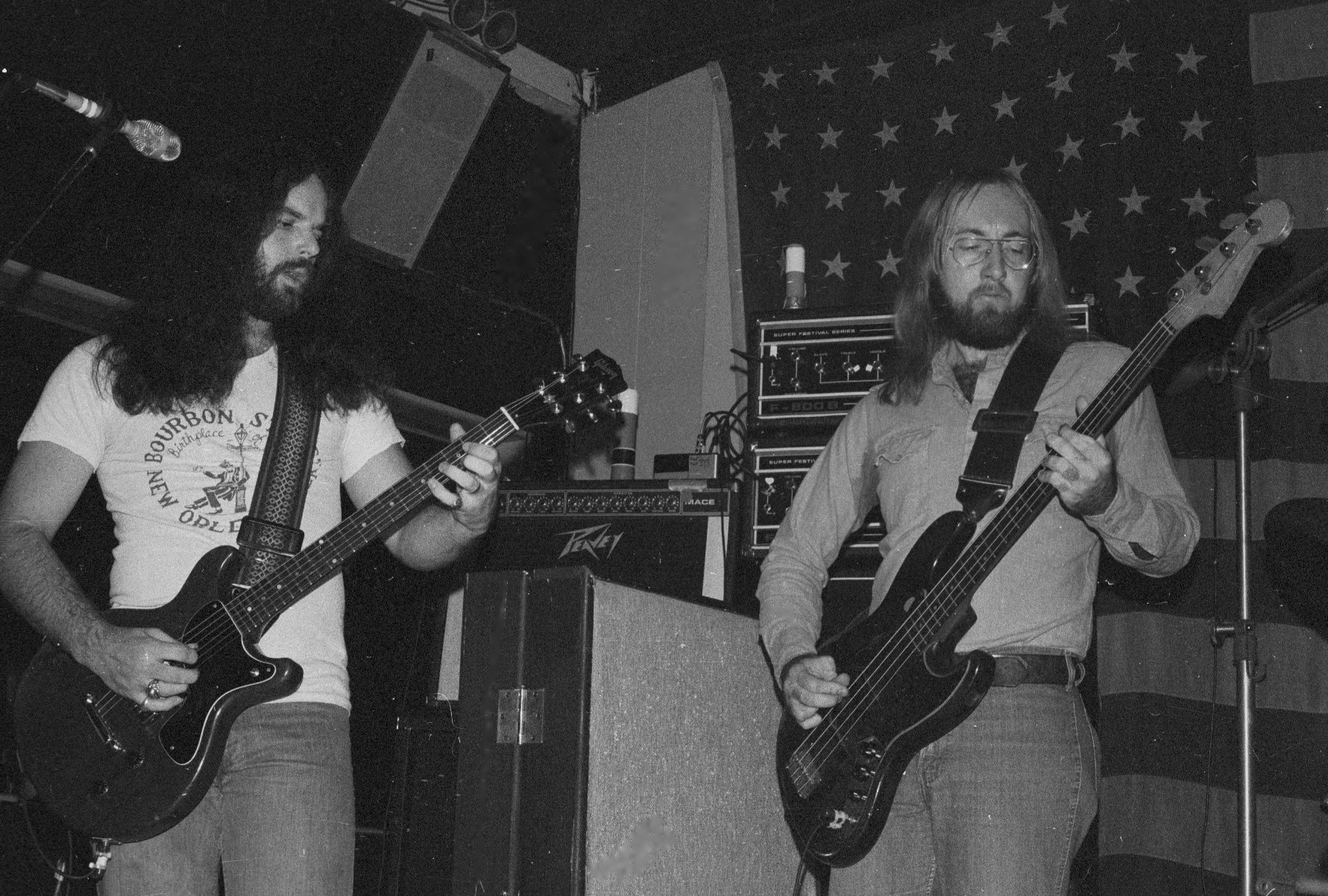
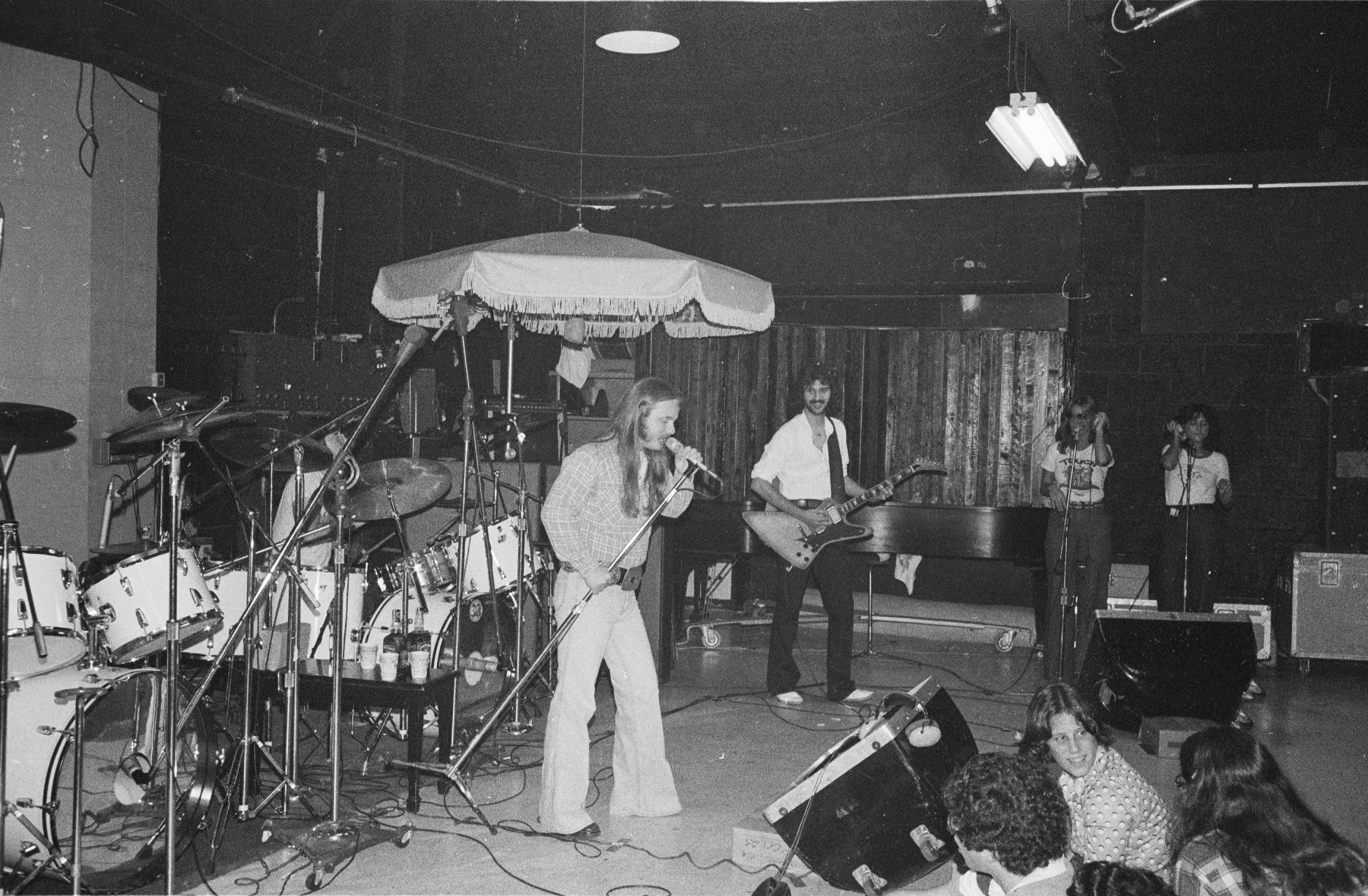
38 Special performing at Trod Nossel Studios in Wallingford, Connecticut

=== 1970s ===
Donnie Van Zant is the younger brother of Lynyrd Skynyrd co-founder and frontman Ronnie Van Zant. Donnie began playing music during his teen years. He formed a band, the Other Side, in 1965, and later Sons of Satan which changed its name to Standard Production in 1968. In 1969 he formed his first professional group, Sweet Rooster, with guitarists Jeff Carlisi (from Doomsday Refreshment Committee) and Kevin Elson, (Note: Elson would become the sound man for Skynyrd and 38 Special, who eventually graduated to producing Journey, Night Ranger and many others.) drummer Bill Pelkey, and Standard Production's bassist Ken Lyons. Carlisi left Sweet Rooster after graduating from high school to study architecture at Georgia Tech and was replaced by Don Barnes, from a fellow band called Camelots, in 1970. Sweet Rooster evolved into Alice Marr with Van Zant, Barnes, Elson, Pelkey, bassist Larry Steele and keyboardist Billy Powell, who soon moved on to being a roadie for Lynyrd Skynyrd before joining them as their pianist.

In the meantime, Van Zant, Barnes and Lyons, while continuing to work their day jobs as well as their musical careers, began composing original songs. By 1974, they decided to form "the ultimate band" that would be their "one last shot" at success. Briefly, Van Zant was considering a higher-paying position for the railroad at which he worked, but was finally convinced by brother Ronnie to stick with music since it was "in his blood".

The new group consisted of Van Zant, Barnes, Steele (who dropped out almost immediately, to be replaced by Lyons, later returning as the group's stage manager), drummer Steve Brookins (who had played with Van Zant in Sons of Satan), second drummer Jack Grondin (a New Jersey native who was attending Jacksonville University at the time) and a returning Carlisi. The band's name was thought up after an incident which found the boys practicing in a warehouse out in the middle of nowhere. When police arrived after being notified by locals of the noise, the band members were unable to come out because of a padlock on the door. One of the cops said, "That's all right. We'll let this .38 special do the talking", and shot off the lock. Though Jeff Carlisi insists this story is false and was created for early marketing.

Now that they had their name, the group spent most of 1975 and 1976 playing a steady grind of one-nighters, mostly in the South and the Midwest. Eventually, big brother Ronnie, who had hooked the boys up with Phil Walden's Paragon Booking Agency, who had worked with Skynyrd, figured Donnie and the gang had paid enough dues and set them up with Skynryd's manager Peter Rudge, who also handled the Who and was tour manager for the Rolling Stones. Rudge quickly set the group up to open shows for popular acts such as Peter Frampton, Foghat and Kiss, and got them signed to A&M Records, who assigned Dan Hartman (of Edgar Winter Group fame) to produce their first album, 38 Special, which was released in May 1977.

During the record's recording, bassist Ken Lyons had decided to leave the band due to domestic troubles and was replaced by their friend, roadie and original Lynyrd Skynyrd member, Larry Junstrom. Also in 1977, the band added two female backup singers, Carol Bristow and Dale Krantz. Krantz (who left to front Rossington Collins Band) was replaced by Nancy Henderson (1979–1981), Lu Moss (1981–1984) and then Lynn Hineman (1986–1987), before backup singers were dispensed with in 1987.

In October 1977, Ronnie Van Zant was killed when Skynyrd's plane crashed. Donnie wrote "Take Me Back" as a tribute to his brother, which appeared on the band's second album, Special Delivery (March 1978), also produced by Hartman.

=== 1980–1999 ===
The band's first two albums had a strong Southern rock influence. But by the early 1980s, 38 Special had shifted to a more accessible guitar-driven arena rock style without completely abandoning the Southern rock roots. The change also involved Don Barnes taking over from frontman Donnie Van Zant on many of the lead vocals. This shift helped to usher in a string of successful albums and singles. Engineer Rodney Mills, who had worked with Atlanta Rhythm Section and others, assumed the producer's reins, and Survivor co-founder Jim Peterik became a frequent songwriting collaborator with the band from 1979 on, which helped account for this change in sound and subsequent success.

"Rockin' into the Night", the title track from the group's third album, which Peterik and his bandmates had originally written for Survivor, found its way to 38 Special's manager, Mark Spector (who'd left his job at A&M Records to manage the group), and was given to the band. Sung by guitarist Don Barnes (who would sing lead vocals on most of the band's hits through 1987), the tune became their first song to receive national airplay, peaking at No. 43 on the Billboard Hot 100 in early 1980.

That paved the way for their platinum-selling fourth record, Wild-Eyed Southern Boys (January 1981), and its bigger hit "Hold On Loosely" (which reached No. 27 in 1981). Their next release, Special Forces (May 1982), contained the Top 10 hit "Caught Up in You" (just like "Hold On Loosely", composed by Barnes, Carlisi, and Peterik), which hit No. 1 on the Billboard Rock Tracks chart, as did the single "If I'd Been the One" (October 1983) from their November 1983 release Tour de Force. "You Keep Runnin' Away" (August 1982) and "Back Where You Belong" (February 1984) continued the sequence of hit radio favorites.

In the fall of 1984, they had another hit with "Teacher, Teacher", from the soundtrack of the 1984 film Teachers, written by Jim Vallance and Bryan Adams. The song climbed to No. 4 on the Billboard Top Tracks Chart, spending ten weeks on the chart. In 1984, 38 Special toured with the up-and-coming Huey Lewis and the News, who were just breaking huge with their Sports album, and in 1986 they shared the bill with the soon-to-be-platinum-selling hard rock band Bon Jovi.

By 1987, Don Barnes, who was having differences with Carlisi and some of the others, had decided to leave the band to go out on his own. He recorded an album called Ride the Storm, which, though slated for release in 1989, was shelved after A&M Records was sold, and was not released until 2017–some 28 years later. In the meantime, the group moved on bringing in San Francisco guitarist Danny Chauncey, after drummer Steve Brookins also decided to leave, and singer/keyboardist Max Carl, from West Coast rhythm and blues group Jack Mack & the Heart Attack.

The next release, Rock & Roll Strategy (June 1988), had the group playing down their heavy guitar sound and putting forth a more 1980s pop keyboard-oriented approach, led by Carl's more R&B-style voice. "Second Chance" (taken from Rock & Roll Strategy) was a No. 1 hit on Billboard's adult contemporary chart in early 1989. Carl was also lead singer on "The Sound of Your Voice" (Billboard Hot 100 No. 33 in 1991) from Bone Against Steel (July 1991), which saw the group moving from A&M to the American iteration of the British label Charisma Records. That same year, Arkansas native Bobby Capps (from Johnny Van Zant Band) came aboard as keyboardist/co-singer and drummer Scott Meeder replaced Jack Grondin after Grondin decided to leave the music business to pursue a career as a Christian missionary. The band found themselves without a home after Charisma folded in 1992.

After touring with the band through the spring of 1992, Max Carl decided to depart, making way for the return of Don Barnes. Since that time, the band has mostly concentrated on touring, with an occasional release of new material. Scott Hoffman took over the drum chair from Meeder later in 1992. Donny Baldwin (ex-Jefferson Starship) filled in for Hoffman on some 1996 tour dates after Hoffman was down with a broken arm, but Gary "Madman" Moffatt (formerly of Cactus) has been the band's drummer since 1997.

In early 1997, long time guitarist and co-founder, Jeff Carlisi, tired of the endless touring, decided to leave to form the Bonnie Blue Band, which led to the supergroup Big People, which also featured Benjamin Orr (from the Cars), Liberty DeVitto (from Billy Joel's band), Derek St. Holmes (ex-Ted Nugent) and Pat Travers. Unfortunately Big People failed to launch after the death of Benjamin Orr in 2000.

Through the small Razor & Tie label, 38 Special released "Fade to Blue" from the album Resolution (the last album to feature Carlisi, released in June 1997). The single hit No. 33 on the Mainstream Rock chart in 1997. Since 1997's Resolution, two more releases came out on the CMC International and Sanctuary Records labels, respectively A Wild-Eyed Christmas Night (September 2001) and Drivetrain (July 2004).

=== 2000s–present ===
In 2007, 38 Special was the opening act on Lynyrd Skynyrd and Hank Williams Jr.'s Rowdy Frynds Tour. Also, on September 27, 2008, they filmed a CMT Crossroads special with country singer Trace Adkins, performing both artists' hits from over the years. In 2009, 38 Special opened for REO Speedwagon and Styx as part of the "Can't Stop Rockin' Tour".

Van Zant missed a handful of shows in 2011, and in 2012 a notice was posted on 38 Special's website saying Donnie Van Zant would not tour with the band due to health issues related to inner-ear nerve damage, although he would continue to write and record with the band. In 2013, after nearly a year of missing performances, Van Zant officially left 38 Special after 39 years and retired from music.

In 2012, original bassist Ken Lyons died at age 59. In 2014, longtime bassist Larry Junstrom was replaced by Barry Dunaway (a veteran of many classic rock groups, including Pat Travers Band, Yngwie Malmsteen and Survivor). Dunaway had previously filled in for Junstrom for a handful of shows in 2011, and a few shows in 2013 as well. Junstrom was then forced to retire due to a hand injury that required surgery.

Since 2019, the band's lineup has consisted of Don Barnes, keyboardist/vocalist Bobby Capps, drummer Gary Moffatt, Dunaway, and guitarist Jerry Riggs. This leaves Don Barnes as the only original member, although Barnes was absent from the band from 1987 until 1992. Larry Junstrom died on October 6, 2019, at age 70.

In 2022, bassist Paul Drennan filled in for Barry Dunaway.

On July 11, 2025, the band announced they were releasing their first album in 21 years, titled Milestone. This announcement was accompanied by the release of the album's first single "All I Haven't Said".

== Band members ==
=== Current members ===
- Don Barnes – lead and backing vocals, guitar, harmonica, mandolin, piano (1974–1987, 1992–present)
- Bobby Capps – keyboards, backing and lead vocals (1991–present)
- Gary "Madman" Moffatt – drums, percussion (1996–present)
- Barry Dunaway – bass, backing vocals (2014–present; touring substitute 2011, 2013)
- Jerry Riggs – guitar, backing vocals (2019–present)

=== Touring musicians ===
- Carol Bristow – backing vocals (1977–1987)
- Dale Krantz Rossington – backing vocals (1977–1979)
- Nancy Henderson – backing vocals (1979–1980)
- Lu Moss – backing vocals (1981–1984)
- Lynn Hineman – backing vocals (1986–1987)

=== Touring substitutes ===
- Donny Baldwin – drums, percussion (1996; filled in for Scott Hoffman)
- Paul Drennan (Drennen) – bass, backing vocals (2022; filled in for Barry Dunaway)

=== Former members ===
- Donnie Van Zant – lead and backing vocals, occasional guitar (1974–2013)
- Jeff Carlisi – lead guitar (1974–1997)
- Jack Grondin – drums, percussion (1974–1991)
- Steve Brookins – drums, percussion (1974–1987)
- Ken Lyons – bass (1974–1977; died 2012)
- Larry Junstrom – bass, occasional guitar (1977–2014; died 2019)
- Steve McRay – keyboards, harmonica, backing vocals (1986–1987)
- Max Carl – lead and backing vocals, keyboards, guitar (1987–1992)
- Danny Chauncey – guitar, backing vocals, keyboards (1987–2019)
- Scott Meeder – drums, percussion (1991–1992)
- Scott Hoffman – drums, percussion (1992–1997)

=== Lineups ===
1974–1977	1977–1986	1986–1987	1987–1991
Don Barnes – guitar, mandolin, keyboards, harmonica, backing vocals; Donnie Van Zant – lead vocals, guitar; Steve Brookins – drums, percussion; Jeff Carlisi – guitar; Jack Grondin – drums, percussion; Ken Lyons – bass	Don Barnes – lead vocals, guitar, mandolin, keyboards, harmonica; Donnie Van Zant – lead vocals, guitar; Steve Brookins – drums, percussion; Jeff Carlisi – guitar; Jack Grondin – drums, percussion; Larry Junstrom – bass, guitar	Don Barnes – lead vocals, guitar, mandolin, keyboards, harmonica; Donnie Van Zant – lead vocals, guitar; Steve Brookins – drums, percussion; Jeff Carlisi – guitar; Jack Grondin – drums, percussion; Larry Junstrom – bass, guitar; Steve McRay – keyboards, harmonica, backing vocals	Donnie Van Zant – lead vocals, guitar; Jeff Carlisi – guitar; Jack Grondin – drums, percussion; Larry Junstrom – bass, guitar; Max Carl – lead vocals, keyboards; Danny Chauncey – guitar, backing vocals
1991–1992	1992–1997	1997–2013	2013–2014
Donnie Van Zant – lead vocals, guitar; Jeff Carlisi – guitar; Larry Junstrom – bass, guitar; Max Carl – lead vocals, keyboards; Danny Chauncey – guitar, backing vocals; Scott Meeder – drums, percussion	Don Barnes – lead vocals, guitar, mandolin, keyboards, harmonica; Donnie Van Zant – lead vocals, guitar; Jeff Carlisi – guitar; Larry Junstrom – bass, guitar; Danny Chauncey – guitar, backing vocals; Bobby Capps – keyboards, vocals; Scott Hoffman – drums, percussion	Don Barnes – lead vocals, guitar, mandolin, keyboards, harmonica; Donnie Van Zant – lead vocals, guitar; Larry Junstrom – bass, guitar; Danny Chauncey – guitar, backing vocals; Bobby Capps – keyboards, vocals; Gary Moffatt – drums, percussion	Don Barnes – lead vocals, guitar, mandolin, keyboards, harmonica; Larry Junstrom – bass, guitar; Danny Chauncey – guitar, backing vocals; Bobby Capps – keyboards, vocals; Gary Moffatt – drums, percussion
2014–2019	2019–present
Don Barnes – lead vocals, guitar, mandolin, keyboards, harmonica; Tyler Greer – guitar, backing vocals; Bobby Capps – keyboards, vocals; Gary Moffatt – drums, percussion; Barry Dunaway – bass, backing vocals	Don Barnes – lead vocals, guitar, mandolin, keyboards, harmonica; Bobby Capps – keyboards, vocals; Gary Moffatt – drums, percussion; Barry Dunaway – bass, backing vocals; Jerry Riggs – guitar, backing vocals

== Discography ==
=== Studio albums ===
- 38 Special (1977)
- Special Delivery (1978)
- Rockin' into the Night (1979)
- Wild-Eyed Southern Boys (1981)
- Special Forces (1982)
- Tour de Force (1983)
- Strength in Numbers (1986)
- Rock & Roll Strategy (1988)
- Bone Against Steel (1991)
- Resolution (1997)
- A Wild-Eyed Christmas Night (2001)
- Drivetrain (2004)
- Milestone (2025)
