= Don Barnes =

American rock vocalist and guitarist

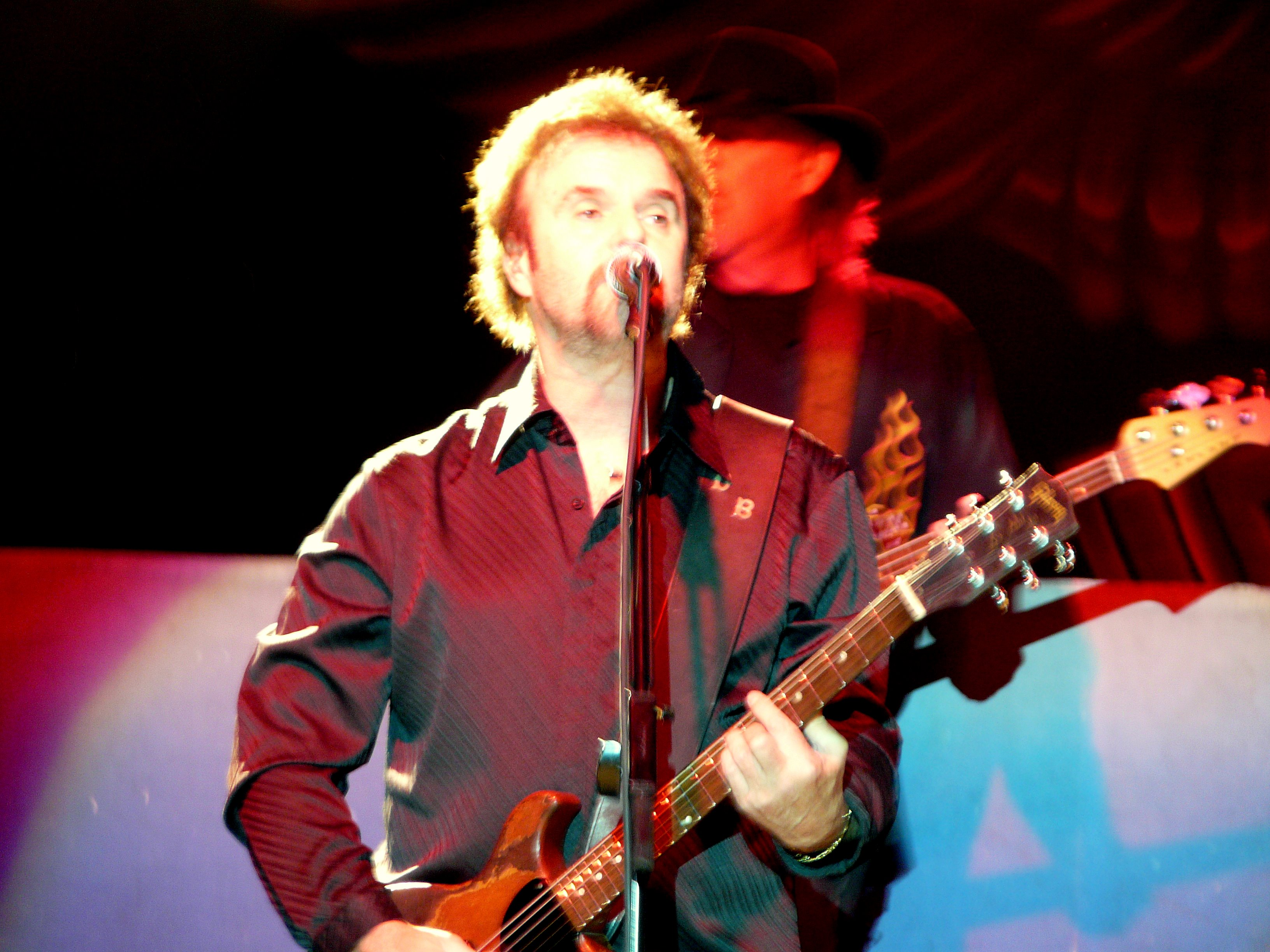
- Barnes with 38 Special in 2008

Background information
- Born: Richard Donald Barnes; December 3, 1952 (age 73); Jacksonville, Florida, United States
- Genres: Southern rock
- Occupation: Musician
- Instruments: Vocals, guitar, slide guitar, mandolin, harmonica
- Years active: 1974–present
- Member of: 38 Special
- Spouse: Christine Barnes (m. 2013)

Richard Donald Barnes (born December 3, 1952) is an American rock vocalist and guitarist and one of the founding members of the Southern rock band 38 Special. Barnes performed lead vocals on nearly all of the group's biggest hits, including "Rockin' into the Night", "Hold On Loosely", "Caught Up in You", "If I'd Been the One", "Back Where You Belong", "Like No Other Night", "Somebody Like You", "Teacher Teacher", "Back to Paradise", "You Keep Runnin' Away" and "Fantasy Girl".

Barnes left the band in 1987 with the song "Back to Paradise" (from the movie Revenge of the Nerds II: Nerds in Paradise) being his final hit with them. He was replaced by Max Carl.

Barnes recorded a solo album Ride the Storm in 1989 but it was not released due to the record label (A&M Records) being sold. It featured many of the top session musicians of the time, such as Jeff Porcaro and Dann Huff. The album was co-produced by singer-songwriter Martin Briley.

Barnes rejoined 38 Special in 1992 and has remained with them ever since. As of 2021, he is the only original member still with the band. His solo album was released on June 30, 2017, on MelodicRock Records.

== Discography ==
=== Solo albums ===
- Ride the Storm (2017) (recorded in 1989)

=== with 38 Special ===
- 38 Special (1977)
- Special Delivery (1978)
- Rockin' into the Night (1979)
- Wild-Eyed Southern Boys (1981)
- Special Forces (1982)
- Tour de Force (1983)
- Strength in Numbers (1986)
- Resolution (1997)
- A Wild-Eyed Christmas Night (2001)
- Drivetrain (2004)
- Milestone (2025)
