= Rodney Mills =

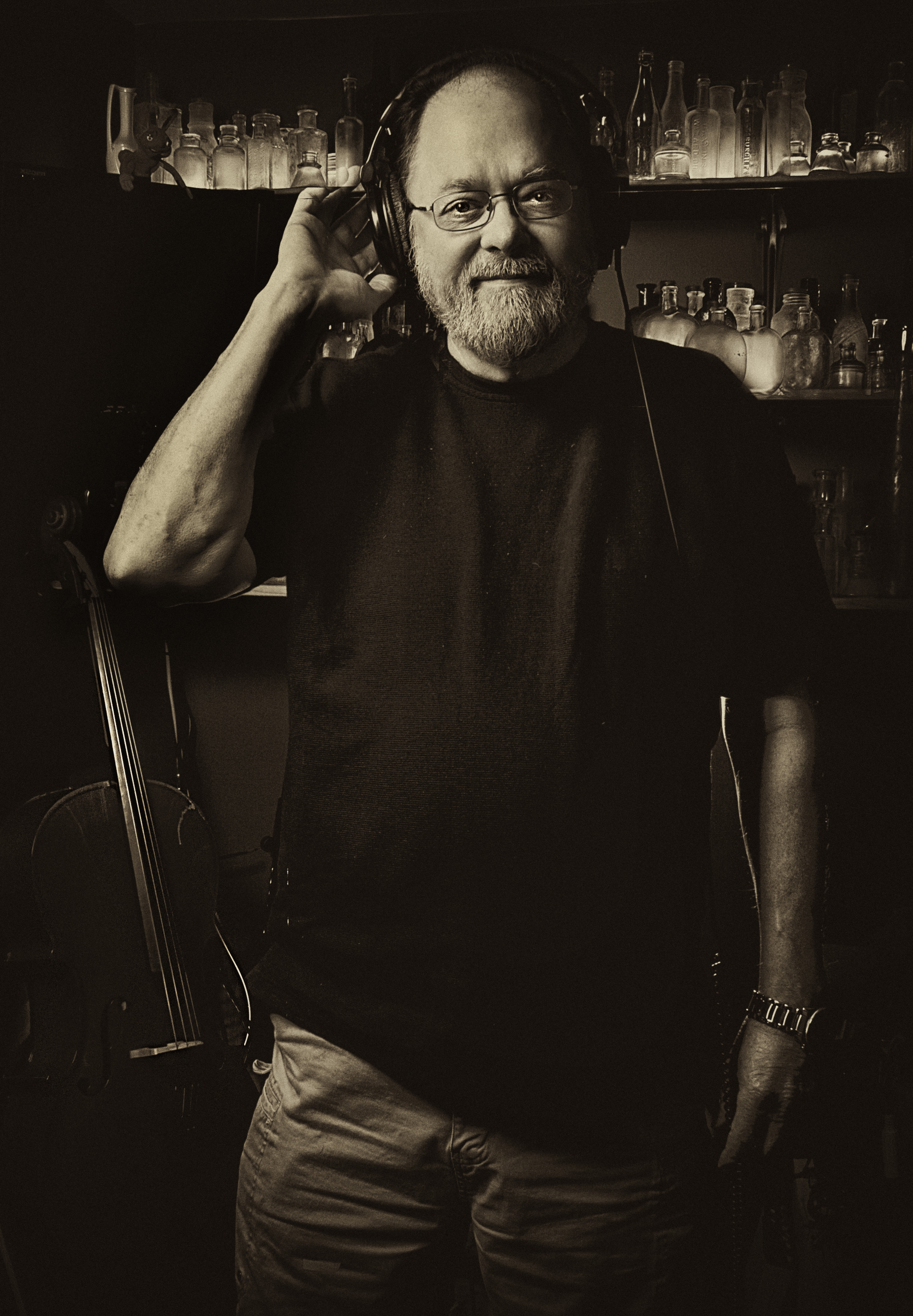
- Rodney Mills at his mastering studio in Duluth, GA (2009)

Background information
- Born: July 13, 1946 (age 80); Douglas, Georgia, U.S.
- Occupations: Audio Engineer, Producer
- Years active: 1962–present
- Website: rodneymills.com

Rodney Mills is an American mastering engineer based in Atlanta, Georgia.

He has been involved in the music industry for over 50 years and has earned over 50 gold and platinum records for engineering, producing, and mastering.

== Biography ==
A native Georgian, Rodney began his music career in 1962 playing bass for The Bushmen. During his seven years with the group, Rodney became intrigued with recording music and actively started pursuing a career as an engineer in 1967.

In 1968, Rodney became chief engineer at Lefevre Sound Studios in Atlanta, Georgia. During his three years there, he engineered records for several local and national acts ranging from gospel, country, R&B, rock, and everything in between. Some of the artists he worked with there included Joe South, Billy Joe Royal, Dennis Yost and the Classics IV, The Meters, The Stamps Quartet, James Brown, The Winstons, Mylon LeFevre, and scores of other projects.

In 1970, Rodney was approached by Buddy Buie to build a studio for him and become the chief engineer there. He co-designed and oversaw the construction of the famous Studio One in a suburb of Atlanta, Doraville, Georgia. For the next sixteen years, Rodney worked almost exclusively in this studio on numerous projects for different artists and clients.

During his tenure at Studio One, Rodney worked with numerous artists as engineer and later as producer/engineer. The list includes: B. J. Thomas, The Atlanta Rhythm Section (11 albums), Lynyrd Skynyrd (4 albums), 38 Special (7 albums), Outlaws, Journey, Eric Martin, Helix, and many other albums and projects.

In 1986, Rodney left Studio One to continue his career as a producer independent of any studio. Since then, he has produced records for 38 Special (2 albums), Gregg Allman (2 albums), Cruzados (2 albums), The Radiators (2 albums), The Doobie Brothers (2 albums) and several other projects. In 1989, Rodney produced Billboard Magazine's number one Adult Contemporary Song of the Year with 38 Special's "Second Chance".

In 1994, Rodney formed "Rodney Mills Masterhouse", a mastering service in Atlanta. Since then, he has mastered thousands of projects for national and regional acts including Pearl Jam, The Wallflowers, Collective Soul, Kentucky Headhunters, R.E.M., Atlanta Rhythm Section, Gucci Mane, Sugarland, Rage Against the Machine, Bonecrusher, Drive-By Truckers, Unk, Soulja Boy, Zac Brown Band, Pylon Chris DeMarco, and others.

== Notable recordings ==
- "Color Him Father" – The Winstons (1969)
- "Amen, Brother" – The Winstons (1969) (featuring the "Amen Break")
- "Tuesday's Gone" – Lynyrd Skynyrd (1973)
- "Simple Man" – Lynyrd Skynyrd (1973)
- "Free Bird" – Lynyrd Skynyrd (1973)
- "Sweet Home Alabama" – Lynyrd Skynyrd (1974)
- "Doraville" – Atlanta Rhythm Section (1974)
- "Moonlight Feels Right" – Starbuck (1976)
- "So Into You" – Atlanta Rhythm Section (1976)
- Street Survivors – Lynyrd Skynyrd (1977)
- "What's Your Name" – Lynyrd Skynyrd (1977)
- "That Smell" – Lynyrd Skynyrd (1977)
- "Ain't No Good Life" – Lynyrd Skynyrd (1977)
- "I Love the Nightlife" – Alicia Bridges (1978)
- "Spooky" – Atlanta Rhythm Section (1978)
- "Imaginary Lover" – Atlanta Rhythm Section (1978)
- "Champagne Jam" – Atlanta Rhythm Section (1978)
- "I'm Not Gonna Let It Bother Me Tonight" – Atlanta Rhythm Section (1978)
- Rockin' into the Night – .38 Special (1980)
- Captured – Journey (1981)
- "Hold On Loosely" – .38 Special (1981)
- "Fantasy Girl" – .38 Special (1981)
- "Caught Up in You" – .38 Special (1981)
- "I'm No Angel" – Gregg Allman (1986)
- "Before the Bullets Fly" – Gregg Allman (1988)
- "Second Chance" – .38 Special (1988)
- Rock & Roll Strategy – .38 Special (1988)
- Cycles – The Doobie Brothers (1989)
- Dreams – The Allman Brothers Band (1989)
- Brotherhood – The Doobie Brothers (1991)

== Musical history ==
In 1969 at Lefevre Sound Studios, Rodney was beginning his career as a recording engineer. One of his first engineering projects included recording a 45rpm single for a Washington, D.C.–based gospel group called The Winstons. The single for the group, titled "Color Him Father", went on to sell over 500,000 copies (RIAA certified gold) and won a Grammy Award the same year for Best R&B Song. The B-Side of the 7" vinyl single was an up-tempo instrumental rendition of an older gospel music classic titled "Amen, Brother". This song included a 4 bar drum solo played by Winstons drummer G.C. Coleman, which years later was to become known as the famous "Amen Break". It has now become one of the world's most sampled beats of all time and has been used by many artists including 2 Live Crew, N.W.A, Heavy D, Salt-N-Pepa, Scarface, Schoolly D, Nine Inch Nails, Oasis and Prodigy and has spawned entire musical genres such as Jungle and Acid.

== Awards and recognition ==
1996 was a special year for Rodney, as he was inducted into the Georgia Music Hall of Fame. The annual black-tie event held at the Georgia World Congress Center honors Georgians in the music business. Along with the acceptance of this most prestigious award, he was enshrined in the Hall of Fame building in Macon, Georgia. among other notable inductees including Ray Charles, Lena Horne, James Brown, Bill Lowery, Buddy Buie, Little Richard, Gladys Knight, Joe South, TLC, R.E.M. and many others.

== Affiliations ==
Rodney has served on the board of governors for NARAS (National Academy of Recording Arts and Science), and has served on several committees and panels for their Music In The Schools program. This organization is responsible for the nomination and voting of the Grammy Awards, one of the highest honors awarded for excellence in music.

He currently serves on the board of governors for Friends of Georgia Music, which oversees the induction process for the Georgia Music Hall of Fame.
