= Larry Junstrom =

American bassist (1949–2019)

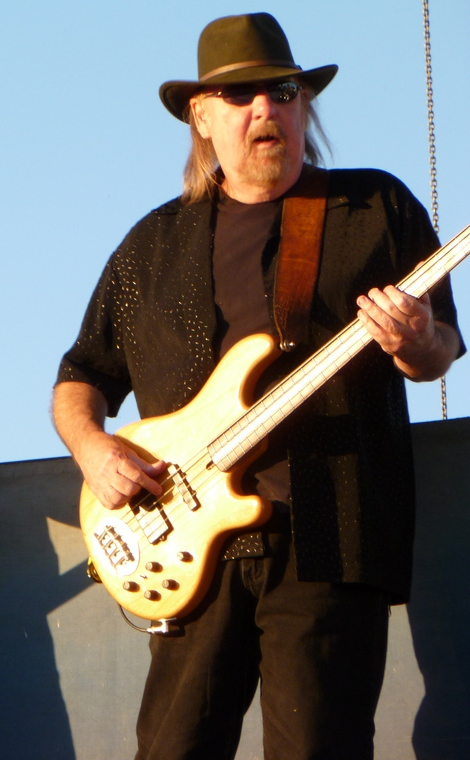
- Junstrom performing at the Dixon May Fair in 2010

Background information
- Born: Lawrence Edward Junstrom; June 22, 1949; Pittsburgh, Pennsylvania, U.S.
- Died: October 6, 2019 (aged 70) Palatka, Florida, U.S.
- Genre: Southern rock
- Instrument: Bassist
- Years active: 1964–2019
- Formerly of: .38 Special, Lynyrd Skynyrd

Lawrence Edward Junstrom (June 22, 1949 – October 6, 2019) was an American bassist who was a member of the rock band .38 Special from 1977 until 2014. He was also one of the founding members of the southern rock band Lynyrd Skynyrd.

== Early life ==
Junstrom was born in Pittsburgh, Pennsylvania and his family moved to Jacksonville, Florida when he was 10. He played saxophone and clarinet in school in 5th and 6th grades, but immediately became interested in guitar after watching The Beatles on The Ed Sullivan Show. His first guitar was a Silvertone he received as a gift. Junstrom found himself drawn to the bass parts, playing them on the guitar's lower strings. Eventually he fashioned a piece of balsa wood on the neck and bridge of his guitar to modify it into a bass guitar.

== Musical career ==
While in high school, Junstrom became friends with Ronnie Van Zant and was recruited to be the bass guitarist of what became Lynyrd Skynyrd from its formation in 1964 and through its early Jacksonville and regional touring days. He left the band in 1971 before the group's debut album in 1973.

Donnie Van Zant, the middle brother of Lynyrd Skynyrd's, Ronnie Van Zant, formed .38 Special in 1974, with Junstrom joining as the bass guitarist in 1977. Junstrom retired from .38 Special after 37 years in 2014 due to a hand injury that required surgery. Despite this, he continued to make appearances until his death.

== Personal life and death ==
An amateur radio operator, Junstrom's call sign was K4EB, which he read as "Known 4 Excellent Bass." First licensed in 1962, he became a very active operator from 1990 onward.

Junstrom died of a brain tumor on October 6, 2019 in Palatka, Florida at the age of 70. At the time he had been married to his wife Thania for 11 years.
