= Donnie Van Zant =

American singer

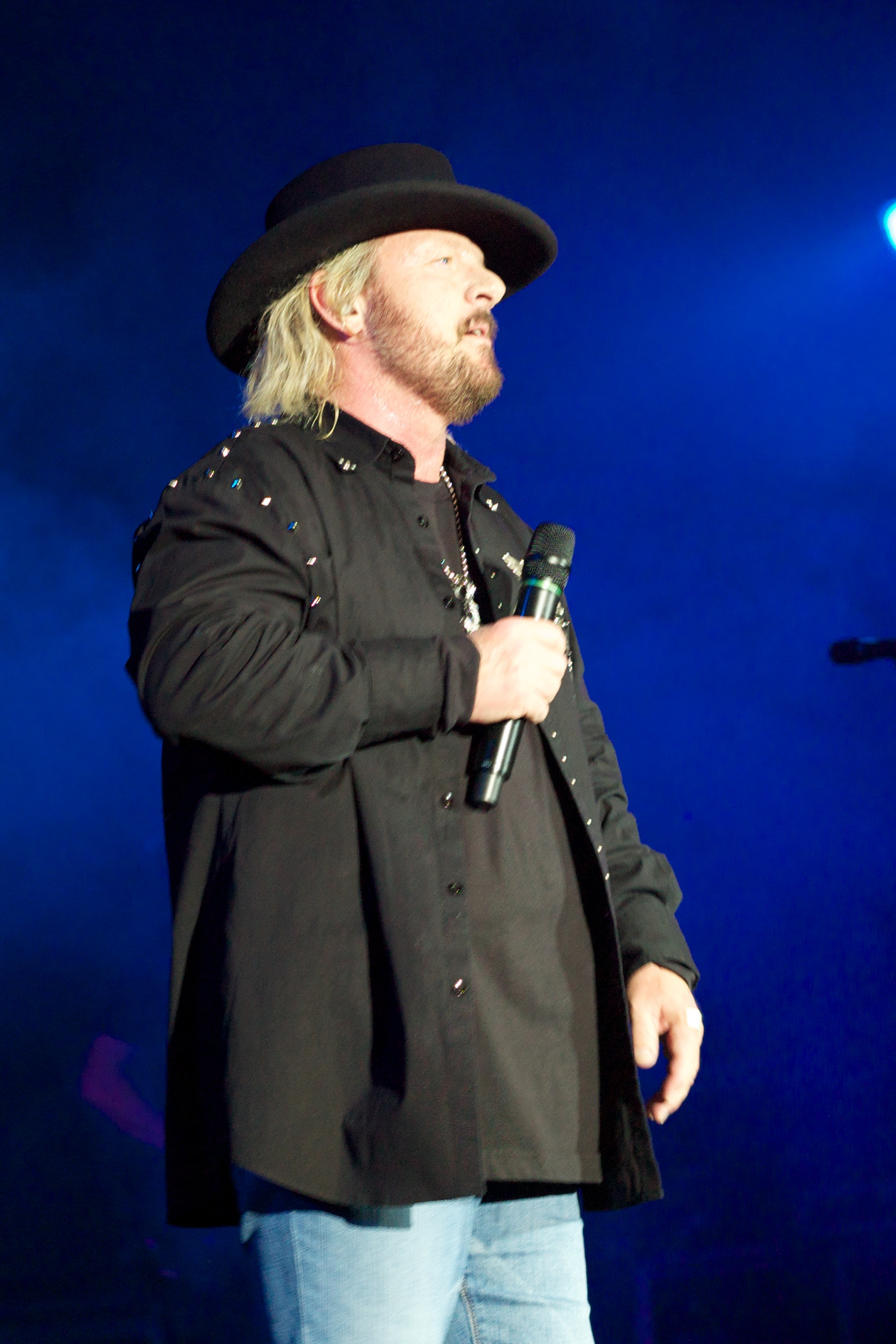
- Van Zant in 2011

Background information
- Born: Donald Newton Van Zant; June 11, 1952 (age 74); Jacksonville, Florida, U.S.
- Genres: Southern rock; country
- Occupations: Singer; songwriter; musician
- Instruments: Vocals; guitar
- Years active: 1968–present
- Formerly of: 38 Special; Van Zant

Donald Newton Van Zant (born June 11, 1952) is an American singer, songwriter, and guitarist. He is best known as a member of the band 38 Special, from its formation in 1974 until 2013. Van Zant was the original lead vocalist for the band, appearing in that role on their first two studio albums. He is the middle of three sons; his older brother Ronnie was the original lead singer for Lynyrd Skynyrd who died in a 1977 plane crash in Mississippi, and his younger brother Johnny has been the lead singer for Lynyrd Skynyrd since 1987.

Donnie and Johnny Van Zant also had performed together as the group Van Zant. For a time, Van Zant considered getting out of the music industry and taking a higher paying job at the railroad, but was persuaded to stay in music by his older brother Ronnie who told him, "It's in your blood". With the formation of 38 Special, it was a last attempt at success in the music industry for Donnie.

== Personal life ==
According to a posting in March 2013 on the 38 Special website, "Donnie Van Zant has not been able to join the band's performances for the past six months. In accordance with his doctor's strict orders and, due to health issues related to inner-ear nerve damage, he will not be able to join 38 Special onstage in the foreseeable future. Donnie will continue to write and record with the band." However, it was announced later in 2013 that he had officially left 38 Special and was retiring.
