= 21st Golden Globe Awards =

Film award ceremony in 1964

- Date: March 11, 1964

The 21st Golden Globe Awards, honoring the best in film and television for 1963, were held on March 11, 1964.

== Winners and nominees ==
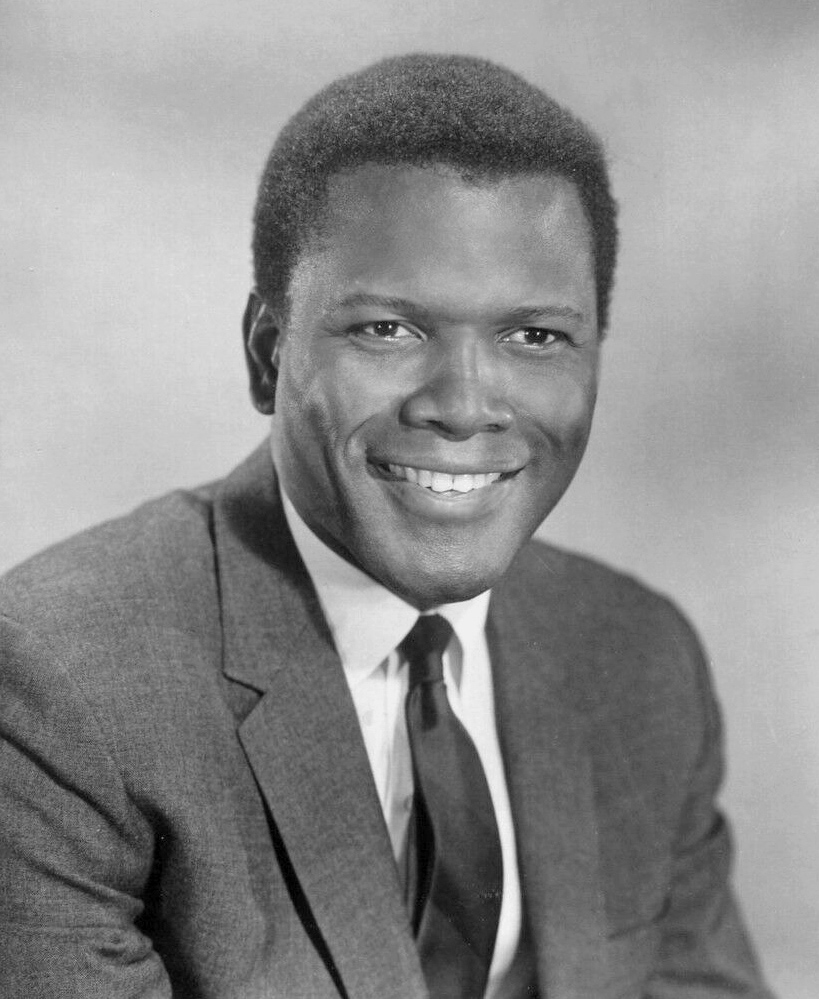
Sidney Poitier won for Lilies of the Field

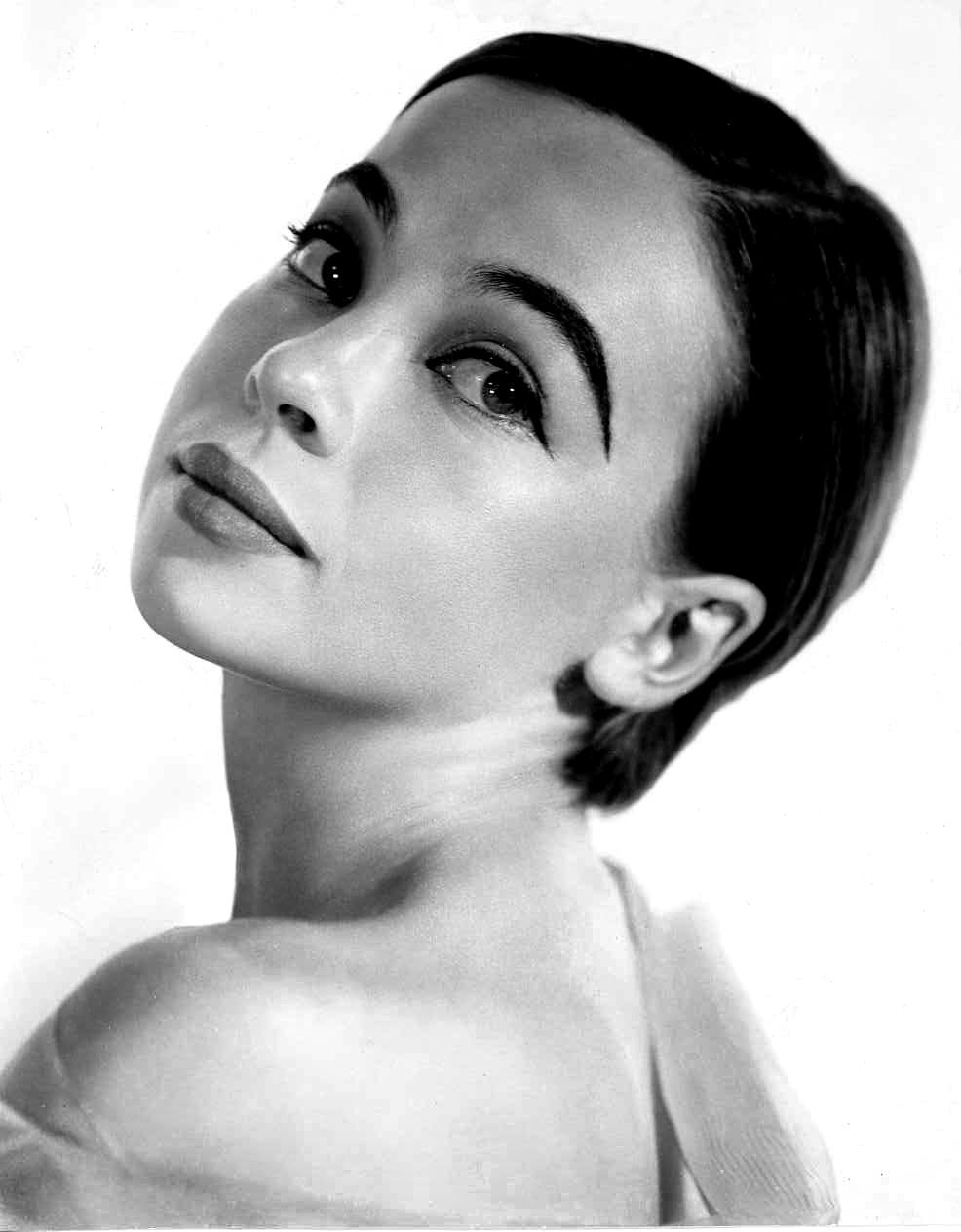
Leslie Caron won for The L-Shaped Room

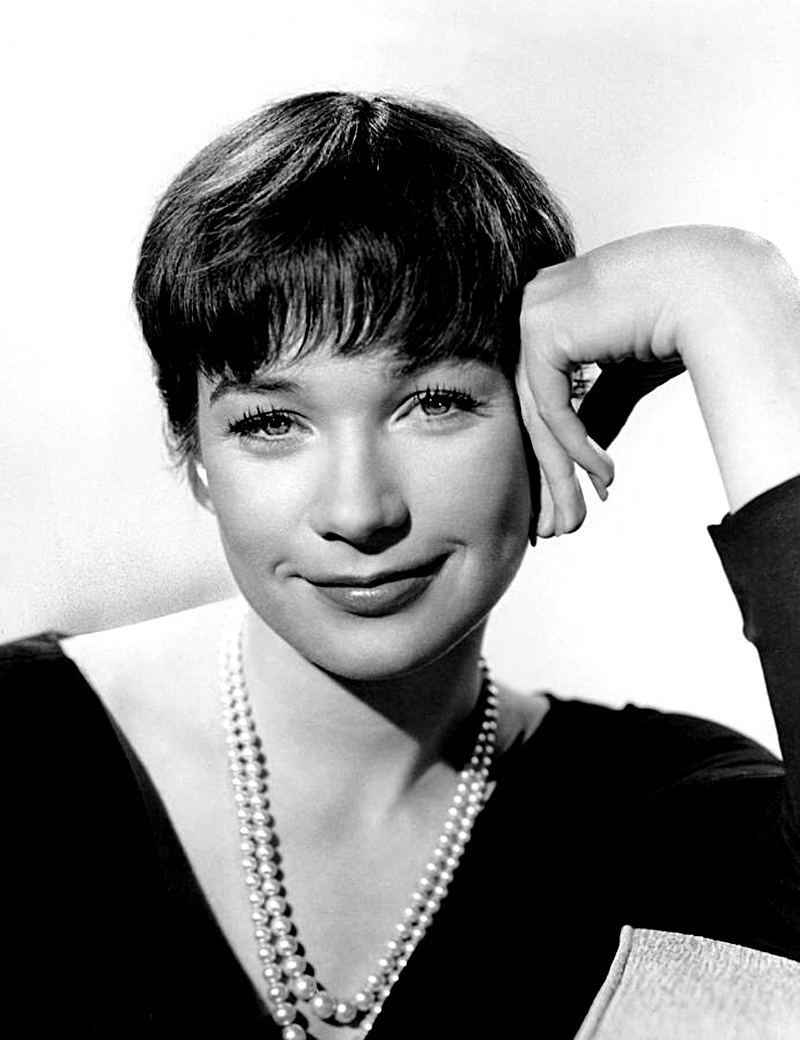
Shirley MacLaine won for Irma la Douce

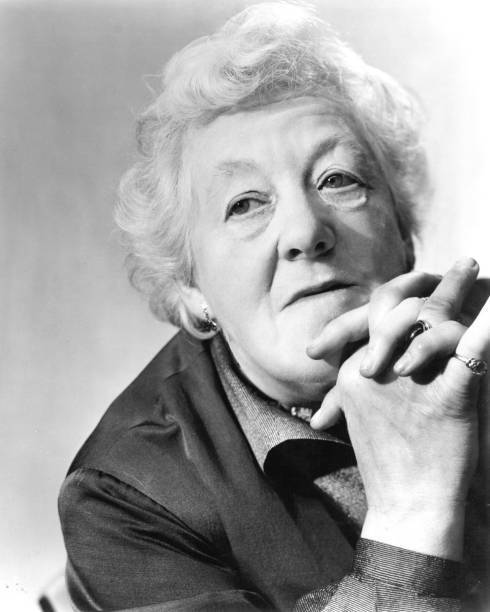
Dame Margaret Rutherford won for The V.I.P.s

=== Film ===
Best Motion Picture
Drama	Comedy or Musical
The Cardinal; America America; Captain Newman, M.D.; The Caretakers; Cleopatra; The Great Escape; Hud; Lilies of the Field	Tom Jones; Irma la Douce; Under the Yum Yum Tree; Bye Bye Birdie; It's a Mad, Mad, Mad, Mad World; A Ticklish Affair
Best Performance in a Motion Picture – Drama
Actor	Actress
Sidney Poitier - Lilies of the Field; Marlon Brando - The Ugly American; Stathis Giallelis - America America; Rex Harrison - Cleopatra; Steve McQueen - Love with the Proper Stranger; Paul Newman - Hud; Gregory Peck - Captain Newman, M.D.; Tom Tryon - The Cardinal	Leslie Caron - The L-Shaped Room; Polly Bergen - The Caretakers; Geraldine Page - Toys in the Attic; Rachel Roberts - This Sporting Life; Romy Schneider - The Cardinal; Alida Valli - The Paper Man; Marina Vlady - The Conjugal Bed; Natalie Wood - Love with the Proper Stranger
Best Performance in a Motion Picture – Comedy or Musical
Actor	Actress
Alberto Sordi - To Bed or Not to Bed; Albert Finney - Tom Jones; James Garner - The Wheeler Dealers; Cary Grant - Charade; Jack Lemmon - Irma la Douce; Jack Lemmon - Under the Yum Yum Tree; Frank Sinatra - Come Blow Your Horn; Terry-Thomas - The Mouse on the Moon; Jonathan Winters - It's a Mad, Mad, Mad, Mad World	Shirley MacLaine - Irma la Douce; Ann-Margret - Bye Bye Birdie; Doris Day - Move Over, Darling; Audrey Hepburn - Charade; Hayley Mills - Summer Magic; Molly Picon - Come Blow Your Horn; Jill St. John - Come Blow Your Horn; Joanne Woodward - A New Kind of Love
Best Supporting Performance in a Motion Picture – Drama, Comedy or Musical
Supporting Actor	Supporting Actress
John Huston - The Cardinal; Lee J. Cobb - Come Blow Your Horn; Bobby Darin - Captain Newman, M.D.; Melvyn Douglas - Hud; Hugh Griffith - Tom Jones; Paul Mann - America America; Roddy McDowall - Cleopatra; Gregory Rozakis - America America	Margaret Rutherford - The V.I.P.s; Diane Baker - The Prize; Joan Greenwood - Tom Jones; Wendy Hiller - Toys in the Attic; Linda Marsh - America America; Patricia Neal - Hud; Liselotte Pulver - A Global Affair; Lilia Skala - Lilies of the Field
Other
Best Director
Elia Kazan - America America; Hall Bartlett - The Caretakers; George Englund - The Ugly American; Joseph L. Mankiewicz - Cleopatra; Otto Preminger - The Cardinal; Tony Richardson - Tom Jones; Martin Ritt - Hud; Robert Wise - The Haunting

=== Television ===
Best Television Series
Best Drama Series	Best Comedy Series
The Richard Boone Show; Bonanza; The Defenders; The Eleventh Hour; Rawhide	The Dick Van Dyke Show; The Beverly Hillbillies; The Bob Hope Show; The Jack Benny Show; The Red Skelton Show
Best Performance in a Television Series
Best TV Star - Male	Best TV Star - Female
Mickey Rooney - Mickey; Richard Boone - The Richard Boone Show; Jackie Gleason - Jackie Gleason: American Scene Magazine; Lorne Greene - Bonanza; E.G. Marshall - The Defenders	Inger Stevens - The Farmer's Daughter; Shirley Booth - Hazel; Carolyn Jones - Burke's Law; Dorothy Loudon - The Garry Moore Show; Gloria Swanson - Burke's Law
Other
Best Variety Series
The Danny Kaye Show; The Andy Williams Show; The Garry Moore Show; The Judy Garland Show; The Tonight Show
