= Tom Jones (1963 film) =

1963 British film by Tony Richardson

- Theatrical poster by Mitchell Hooks
- Directed by: Tony Richardson
- Screenplay by: John Osborne
- Based on: The History of Tom Jones, a Foundling; 1749 novel by Henry Fielding
- Produced by: Tony Richardson
- Starring: Albert Finney; Susannah York; Hugh Griffith; Edith Evans; Joan Greenwood; Diane Cilento; George Devine; David Tomlinson
- Narrated by: Micheál Mac Liammóir
- Cinematography: Walter Lassally
- Edited by: Antony Gibbs
- Music by: John Addison
- Production company: Woodfall Film Productions
- Distributed by: United Artists
- Release date: 26 June 1963
- Running time: 128 minutes
- Country: United Kingdom
- Language: English
- Budget: £467,000 or £480,000
- Box office: $17.07 million (U.S. and Canada rentals)

Tom Jones is a 1963 British period comedy film, an adaptation of Henry Fielding's classic 1749 novel The History of Tom Jones, a Foundling. It is directed by Tony Richardson from a screenplay written by John Osborne, and stars Albert Finney as the titular character. The cast also features Susannah York, Hugh Griffith, Edith Evans, Joyce Redman, Joan Greenwood, Diane Cilento, and David Warner in his film debut.

The film was a success both critically and at the box office, and was one of the most critically acclaimed and popular comedies of its time. At the 36th Academy Awards, it was nominated for ten Oscars, winning four: Best Picture, Best Director for Richardson, Best Adapted Screenplay and Best Original Score. It also won two Golden Globe Awards, including Best Motion Picture – Musical or Comedy, and three BAFTA Awards, including Best Film and Best British Film.

In 1999, the British Film Institute ranked it as the 51st greatest British film of the 20th century.

== Plot ==
Squire Allworthy returns to his estate and discovers a baby in his bed. Thinking that one of his maids, Jenny Jones, and his barber, Mr. Partridge, conceived the illegitimate baby out of lust, the squire banishes them. He names the infant Tom Jones and chooses to raise him as his own son; Tom grows up loving him like a father.

Tom becomes a lively young man whose good looks and kind heart make him popular with women. He truly loves only Sophie, daughter of a neighbour, who returns his love. Sophie, too, must hide her feelings while her aunt and father, Squire Western, try to coerce her to marry someone they think more suitable, Mr. Blifil, the son of Squire Allworthy's sister, Bridget.

When Bridget dies unexpectedly, Blifil intercepts a letter that his mother intended for his uncle's eyes only. But after his mother's funeral, Blifil and his two tutors, Mr. Thwackum and Mr. Square (who had also tutored Tom), join forces to convince the squire that Tom is a villain. Allworthy gives Tom a substantial cash legacy and sends him out into the world to seek his fortune.

Tom is robbed of his fortune, but soon meets his supposed father, Mr. Partridge, who becomes his manservant. Tom rescues a Mrs. Waters from a British soldier and later succumbs to her charms in the famous eating scene. He continues to London along with Partridge and is briefly united with Sophie who is staying with her cousin Lady Bellaston, who adds Tom to her list of amorous conquests. Tom seeks help from Harriet Fitzpatrick is attacked by her estranged husband with whom he ends up in a duel, wounding him. Tom is arrested, jailed and about to be hanged for murder before it is discovered that the letter that Bridget had written to Squire Allworthy confessed that she is Tom's mother. It is discovered also that Tom had not murdered Mr. Fitzpatrick in the duel.

They are able to reach the place of execution just in time to save Tom from hanging. Tom and Sophie are able to marry with everyone's blessing.

== Cast ==
- Albert Finney as Tom Jones
  - Lynn Goldsworthy as infant Tom
- Susannah York as Sophie Western
- Hugh Griffith as Squire Western
- Edith Evans as Miss Western
- Joan Greenwood as Lady Bellaston
- Diane Cilento as Molly Seagrim
- George Devine as Squire Allworthy
- David Tomlinson as Lord Fellamar
- Rosalind Atkinson as Mrs. Millar
- Wilfrid Lawson as Black George
- Rosalind Knight as Mrs. Fitzpatrick
- Jack MacGowran as Partridge
- Freda Jackson as Mrs. Seagrim
- David Warner as Blifil
- Joyce Redman as Mrs. Waters/Jenny Jones
- James Cairncross as Parson Supple
- Rachel Kempson as Bridget Allworthy
- Peter Bull as Thwackum
- Angela Baddeley as Mrs. Wilkins
- George A. Cooper as Fitzpatrick
- Jack Stewart as MacLachlan
- Patsy Rowlands as Honour
- John Moffatt as Square
- Avis Bunnage as Innkeeper
- Mark Dignam as Lieutenant
- Michael Brennan as Jailer at Newgate
- Lynn Redgrave as Susan, Bristol Inn
- Redmond Phillips as Lawyer Dowling
- Julian Glover as Northerton

== Production ==
=== Development ===
Though the British production company Bryanston Films hesistated over whether to make the film in colour, it went bankrupt. United Artists stepped in to finance the film and make it a colour production.

Overall the production faced challenges of disasters, near-disasters and squabbles caused by films being shot on location in the spotty English weather. The film has an unusual comic style: the opening sequence has intertitles and brisk action in the manner of a silent film. Later in the film, characters sometimes break the fourth wall, often by looking directly into the camera and addressing the audience. In one scene the character of Tom Jones suddenly appears to notice the camera and covers the lens with his hat. Another unusual feature is an unseen narrator, voiced by Micheál Mac Liammóir. His mock-serious commentaries between certain scenes deplore the action of several characters as well as the weaknesses in human character, and he provides a poetic denouement for the film.

Despite its success, director Tony Richardson said that he was dissatisfied with the final product. In his autobiography, Richardson wrote that he "felt the movie to be incomplete and botched in much of its execution. I am not knocking that kind of success – everyone should have it – but whenever someone gushes to me about Tom Jones, I always cringe a little inside."

=== Writing ===
John Osborne, in adapting the screenplay from Henry Fielding's novel The History of Tom Jones, a Foundling (1749), truncated and removed notable episodes and characters from the book. He ends the film with the narrator's quoting from a portion of John Dryden's poetic translation of Horace's Ode: To Maecenas:

"Happy the man, and happy he alone,
He who can call today his own:
He who, secure within, can say,
Tomorrow do thy worst, for I have lived today."

=== Filming ===
Castle Street in Bridgwater, Somerset was used as a location in several scenes. Cerne Abbey, Abbey Street and The Royal Oak in Cerne Abbas were used as major locations during the film. Cinematographer Walter Lassally has said that he thought the location unit got on very well together under the circumstances and that the experience was satisfying. He thought Richardson rather lost his way in post-production, endlessly fixing what was not really broken.

== Release ==
=== Critical reception ===
Time magazine's review stated "The film is a way-out, walleyed, wonderful exercise in cinema. It is also a social satire written in blood with a broadaxe. It is bawdy as the British were bawdy when a wench had to wear five petticoats to barricade her virtue".

Rich Gold of Variety wrote "Though Tom Jones is a period piece and very different it has the same lustiness and boisterous content with which to project the star. It should breeze its way cheerfully through the box office figures. It has sex, Eastmancolor, some prime performers and plenty of action. Tony Richardson has directed John Osborne's screenplay with verve, though, occasionally, he falls back on camera tricks and editing which are disconcerting".

On Rotten Tomatoes, the film has an approval rating of 81% based on retrospective reviews from 42 critics, with an average rating of 7.5/10. The site's consensus states: "A frantic, irreverent adaptation of the novel, bolstered by Albert Finney's courageous performance and arresting visuals." On Metacritic, it has a score of 77 out of 100, based on reviews from 15 critics, indicating "generally favorable reviews".

=== Box office ===
The film was financially successful on its initial release in 1963. It came third for the year in British box-office receipts, and was the fourth most popular in the United States. Produced on a budget of $1 million, it earned over $17 million in theater rentals from the United States and Canada, and another $4 million in markets other than the UK and U.S. Finney received 10% of the film's earnings.

=== Accolades ===
Award	Category	Nominee(s)	Result	Ref.
Academy Awards	Best Picture	Tony Richardson	Won	
Academy Awards	Best Director	Tony Richardson	Won	
Academy Awards	Best Actor	Albert Finney	Nominated	
Academy Awards	Best Supporting Actor	Hugh Griffith	Nominated	
Academy Awards	Best Supporting Actress	Diane Cilento	Nominated	
Academy Awards	Best Supporting Actress	Edith Evans	Nominated	
Academy Awards	Best Supporting Actress	Joyce Redman	Nominated	
Academy Awards	Best Screenplay – Based on Material from Another Medium	John Osborne	Won	
Academy Awards	Best Art Direction – Color	Art Direction: Ralph W. Brinton, Ted Marshall, and Jocelyn Herbert; Set Decoration: Josie MacAvin	Nominated	
Academy Awards	Best Music Score – Substantially Original	John Addison	Won	
American Cinema Editors Awards	Best Edited Feature Film	Antony Gibbs	Nominated	
British Academy Film Awards	Best Film from any Source		Won	
British Academy Film Awards	Best British Film		Won	
British Academy Film Awards	Best British Actor	Albert Finney	Nominated	
British Academy Film Awards	Best British Actor	Hugh Griffith	Nominated	
British Academy Film Awards	Best British Actress	Edith Evans	Nominated	
British Academy Film Awards	Best British Screenplay	John Osborne	Won	
Directors Guild of America Awards	Outstanding Directorial Achievement in Motion Pictures	Tony Richardson	Won	
Golden Globe Awards	Best Motion Picture – Musical or Comedy		Won	
Golden Globe Awards	Best Foreign Film – English-Language		Nominated	
Golden Globe Awards	Best Actor in a Motion Picture – Musical or Comedy	Albert Finney	Nominated	
Golden Globe Awards	Best Supporting Actor – Motion Picture	Hugh Griffith	Nominated	
Golden Globe Awards	Best Supporting Actress – Motion Picture	Joan Greenwood	Nominated	
Golden Globe Awards	Best Director – Motion Picture	Tony Richardson	Nominated	
Golden Globe Awards	Most Promising Newcomer – Male	Albert Finney	Won (Note: Tied with Stathis Giallelis for America America and Robert Walker Jr. for The Ceremony.)	
Grammy Awards	Best Original Score from a Motion Picture or Television Show	John Addison	Won	
Laurel Awards	Top Comedy		Won	
Laurel Awards	Top Male Comedy Performance	Albert Finney	Nominated	
Laurel Awards	Top Male Supporting Performance	Hugh Griffith	Nominated	
Laurel Awards	Top Female Supporting Performance	Diane Cilento	Nominated	
National Board of Review Awards	Best Film		Won	
National Board of Review Awards	Top Ten Films		Won	
National Board of Review Awards	Best Director	Tony Richardson	Won	
New York Film Critics Circle Awards	Best Film		Won	
New York Film Critics Circle Awards	Best Director	Tony Richardson	Won	
New York Film Critics Circle Awards	Best Actor	Albert Finney	Won	
Venice International Film Festival	Golden Lion	Tony Richardson	Nominated	
Venice International Film Festival	Best Actor	Albert Finney	Won	
Writers' Guild of Great Britain Awards	Best British Comedy Screenplay	John Osborne	Won	

Ilya Lopert accepted the Academy Award for Best Picture on behalf of the producers. After his death, the Oscar was given by his estate to Albert Finney.

Tom Jones is the only film in the history of the Academy Awards in which three actresses were nominated for the Academy Award for Best Supporting Actress. Margaret Rutherford won the category for her role in The V.I.P.s.

The film's five acting nominations and no wins matched the record set for nominations by Peyton Place in 1957. It was the last film to match this record.

The film was reissued in 1989 by The Samuel Goldwyn Company. For this release, Richardson trimmed the film by seven minutes. It is available through the Criterion Collection, paired with the original version.

== See also ==
- BFI Top 100 British films
