= Blue (1968 film) =

1968 film by Silvio Narizzano

- Film poster
- Directed by: Silvio Narizzano
- Written by: Meade Roberts; Ronald M. Cohen
- Based on: original story by Ronald M. Cohen
- Produced by: Judd Bernard; Irwin Winkler
- Starring: Terence Stamp; Joanna Pettet; Karl Malden; Ricardo Montalbán
- Cinematography: Stanley Cortez
- Edited by: Stewart Linder
- Music by: Manos Hatzidakis
- Production companies: Kettledrum Production, Inc.
- Distributed by: Paramount Pictures
- Release date: April 23, 1968 (Salt Lake City)
- Running time: 113 minutes
- Country: United States
- Language: English

Blue is a 1968 American Western film directed by Silvio Narizzano and starring Terence Stamp, Joanna Pettet, Karl Malden, Ricardo Montalbán, and Stathis Giallelis. The film was made in Panavision anamorphic and released by Paramount Pictures on May 10, 1968.

== Plot ==
The year is 1880. Mexican bandit and revolutionary Ortega has three sons, Xavier, Manuel, and Antonio, and one adopted son, Azul, which means Blue, the color of the young man's eyes. Antonio is fatally shot while attacking Texas settlers. Manuel attempts to rape Joanne, one of the settler women. Feeling pity for the woman, Azul fatally shoots Manuel just as one of the settlers shoots Azul.

Joanne tells her father, Doc, that Azul saved her and they nurse him back to health in their home. Ortega finds Azul and asks him to return home, but when Azul refuses Ortega threatens to wipe out the settlers. Azul organizes the settlers into a defense force that manages to destroy the attackers, including Ortega and Xavier. Before dying Ortega asks Azul to bury him in Mexico. Carrying out Ortega's dying wish, Azul is shot by the fatally wounded Carlos, Ortega's closest compatriot. Joanne brings Azul's body back for burial in Texas.

== Cast ==
- Terence Stamp as Azul [Blue]
- Joanna Pettet as Joanne Morton
- Karl Malden as Doc Morton
- Ricardo Montalbán as Ortega
- Anthony Costello as Jess Parker
- Joe De Santis as Carlos
- James Westerfield as Abe Parker
- Stathis Giallelis as Manuel
- Carlos East as Xavier
- Sara Vardi as Inez
- Robert Lipton as Antonio
- Kevin Corcoran as Rory Calvin
- Ivalou Redd as Helen Buchanan
- Dorothy Conrad as Alma Wishoff
- Helen Kleeb as Elizabeth Parker
- Michael Bell as Jim Benton
- Wes Bishop as Settler
- Marian Mason as Mrs. Kramer
- Alma Beltran as Cantina Proprietress
- Sally Kirkland as Sara Lambert
- Peggy Lipton as Laurie Kramer
- Jerry Gatlin as Wes Lambert
- William Shannon as Police Chief
- Michael Nader as Mexican Assassin

== Production ==
Parts of the film were shot at Professor Valley, Sevenmile Canyon, Long Valley, Kane Creek Road, the Sand Flats, La Sal Mountains, and the Klondike Flats in Utah.

The production of the film in Utah was used for the 1968 film Fade In starring Burt Reynolds and Barbara Loden. Loden plays an assistant film editor who falls in love with a rancher played by Reynolds.

== Evaluation in film guides ==
Steven H. Scheuer's Movies on TV gives Blue 1 star (out of 4), stating "[I]t took many celebrated names on both sides of the camera to botch up this western drama", continuing that "[T]he tale... should have been more fascinating than it turns out" and concluding with "[D]irector Silvio Narizzano was responsible for the lovely Georgy Girl so we can't blame him entirely for this no-color no-flavor western". Later editions retained the 1 star rating, but featured a shortened, rewritten review which called Blue a "[W]estern oddity" that exhibited "[A] peculiar blend of sagebrush and psychology". Leonard Maltin's Movie Guide did not have a much higher opinion, giving 1 1/2 stars (out of 4) and denigrating it as an "[U]ndistinguished, poorly written Western". Later editions added the words "See also FADE-IN", which Maltin's review describes as an "[O]dd little film made concurrently with BLUE" and notes that "BLUE actors Terence Stamp, Joanna Pettet, Ricardo Montalbán and Sally Kirkland can be glimpsed here".

As in Maltin, The Motion Picture Guide assigned 1½ stars (out of 5), calling it "a waste of time from the outset" and pointing out "[P]retentious direction by Narizzano with Leone-like close-ups and Peckinpah-like slow-motion". The write-up further states, "[T]his movie cost about five million, more than two million over budget. A waste for everyone concerned." Near the end there is mention that "Giallelis (Manuel) made such a splash in Kazan's AMERICA, AMERICA that great things were expected of him. He never should have taken this role."

Two additional guides also rank Blue at or near bottom. Videohound's Golden Movie Retriever threw the film one bone (out of possible four), describing it as "[A] dull western", while Mick Martin's and Marsha Porter's DVD & Video Guide served its lowest rating, "Turkey", stating "God-awful, pretentious Western with Terence Stamp as a monosyllabic gunman."

Among British references, Leslie Halliwell, in his Film Guide, gave no stars (Halliwell's top rating is 4), dismissing it as a "[P]retentious, self-conscious, literary Western without much zest." A quote from Rex Reed was also included, "I don't know which is worse — bad cowboy movies or bad arty cowboy movies. Blue is both." TimeOut Film Guide founding editor Tom Milne was also dismissive, finding it "[A] grotesque, pretension-ridden Western which falls flat on its face with a ponderous yarn about...", while adding that "Terence Stamp struggles unavailingly against the ludicrous dialogue and some fine landscape photography by Stanley Cortez is wrecked by a penchant for gaudy filters and even gaudier sunsets."
