= 16th Directors Guild of America Awards =

- Date: 1964
- Country: United States
- Presented by: Directors Guild of America

Highlights
- Best Director Feature Film: Tom Jones – Tony Richardson
- Best Director Television: Hallmark Hall of Fame for "Pygmalion" – George Schaefer
- Website: https://www.dga.org/Awards/History/1960s/1963.aspx?value=1963

The 16th Directors Guild of America Awards, honoring the outstanding directorial achievements in film and television in 1963, were presented in 1964.

== Winners and nominees ==
=== Film ===
Feature Film

Tony Richardson – Tom Jones

- Federico Fellini – 8½
- Elia Kazan – America America
- Ralph Nelson – Lilies of the Field
- Martin Ritt – Hud

=== Television ===
Television

George Schaefer – Hallmark Hall of Fame for "Pygmalion"

- Buzz Kulik – Kraft Suspense Theatre for "The Case Against Paul Ryker"
- Robert Ellis Miller – Breaking Point for "And James Was a Very Small Snail"
- Stuart Rosenberg – The Richard Boone Show for "The Fling"
- Robert Scheerer – The Danny Kaye Show for "Danny Kay and Dick Van Dyke"

=== Honorary Life Member ===
- Joseph C. Youngerman
