= 24th Venice International Film Festival =

Italian film festival in 1963

- Location: Venice, Italy
- Founded: 1932
- Awards: Golden Lion: Hands Over the City
- Artistic director: Luigi Chiarini
- Festival date: 24 August – 7 September 1963
- Website: Website

Venice Film Festival chronology
- 25th 23rd

The 24th annual Venice International Film Festival was held from 24 August to 7 September 1963.

Italian journalist Arturo Lanocita was the Jury President for the main competition. The Golden Lion was awarded to Hands Over the City directed by Francesco Rosi.

== Jury ==
- Arturo Lanocita, Italian journalist, writer and film critic - Jury President
- Guido Aristarco, Italian film critic
- Piero Gadda Conti, Italian writer and film critic
- Sergei Gerasimov, Soviet filmmaker
- Lewis Jacobs, American director
- Hidemi Kon, Japanese critic
- Claude Mauriac, French writer and journalist

== Official Sections ==
The following films were selected to be screened:

=== In Competition ===
English title	Original title	Director(s)	Production country
Billy Liar		John Schlesinger	United Kingdom
The Cool World		Shirley Clarke	United States
The Executioner	El Verdugo	Luis García Berlanga	Spain
The Fire Within	Le feu follet	Louis Malle	France
The Great Road	Bolshaya doroga	Yuri Ozerov	Soviet Union
The Golden Fern	Zlaté kapradí	Jiří Weiss	Czechoslovakia
Hands Over the City	Le mani sulla città	Francesco Rosi	Italy
High and Low	天国と地獄	Akira Kurosawa	Japan
Hud		Martin Ritt	United States
Introduction to Life	Вступление	Igor Talankin	Soviet Union
Mad Sea	Mare matto	Renato Castellani	Italy
Muriel	Muriel ou le Temps d'un retour	Alain Resnais	France
Ningen	人間	Kaneto Shindô	Japan
Nothing Ever Happens	Nunca pasa nada	Juan Antonio Bardem	Spain, France
Omicron		Ugo Gregoretti	Italy
The Servant		Joseph Losey	United Kingdom
Silence	Milczenie	Kazimierz Kutz	Poland
Sweet and Sour	Dragées au poivre	Jacques Baratier	France
Tom Jones		Tony Richardson	United Kingdom

=== In Competition - First Work ===
English title	Original title	Director(s)	Production country
La belle vie		Robert Enrico	France
Chi lavora è perduto		Tinto Brass	Italy
The Demon	Il demonio	Brunello Rondi	Italy
Greenwich Village Story		Jack O'Connell	United Kingdom
Le Joli Mai		Chris Marker, Pierre Lhomme	France
A Sentimental Attempt	Un tentativo sentimentale	Pasquale Festa Campanile, Massimo Franciosa	Italy
Stories in the Sand	Storie sulla sabbia	Riccardo Fellini	Italy
A Sunday in September	En söndag i september	Jörn Donner	Sweden
The Terrorist	Il terrorista	Gianfranco De Bosio	Italy

=== Out of Competition ===
English title	Original title	Director(s)	Production country
The Chair		Robert Drew	United States
Laugh with Max Linder	En compagnie de Max Linder	Maud Linder	France
Mysteries of Rome	I misteri di Roma	Gianni Bisiach, Libero Bizzarri	Italy
Pour la suite du monde		Pierre Perrault, Marcel Carrière, Michel Brault	Canada
Primary		Richard Leacock	United States
Rose et Landry		Pierre Perrault, Marcel Carrière, Michel Brault	Canada

== Official Awards ==
- Golden Lion: Hands Over the City by Francesco Rosi
- Special Jury Prize:
  - The Fire Within by Louis Malle
  - Introduction to Life by Igor Talankin
- Volpi Cup for Best Actor: Albert Finney for Tom Jones
- Volpi Cup for Best Actress: Delphine Seyrig for Muriel
- Best First Work: A Sunday in September by Jörn Donner
- Best Short Film: The War Game by Mai Zetterling

== Independent Awards ==
=== FIPRESCI Prize ===
- El Verdugo by Luis García Berlanga

=== OCIC Award ===
- Hud by Martin Ritt

=== Pasinetti Award ===
- The Fire Within by Louis Malle
  - Parallel Sections: Il terrorista by Gianfranco De Bosio

=== Lion of San Marco - Grand Prize ===
- Best Documentary: Mud Covered City by Václav Táborsky
