= Shlomo Shamir =

Israeli military officer

- שלמה שמיר
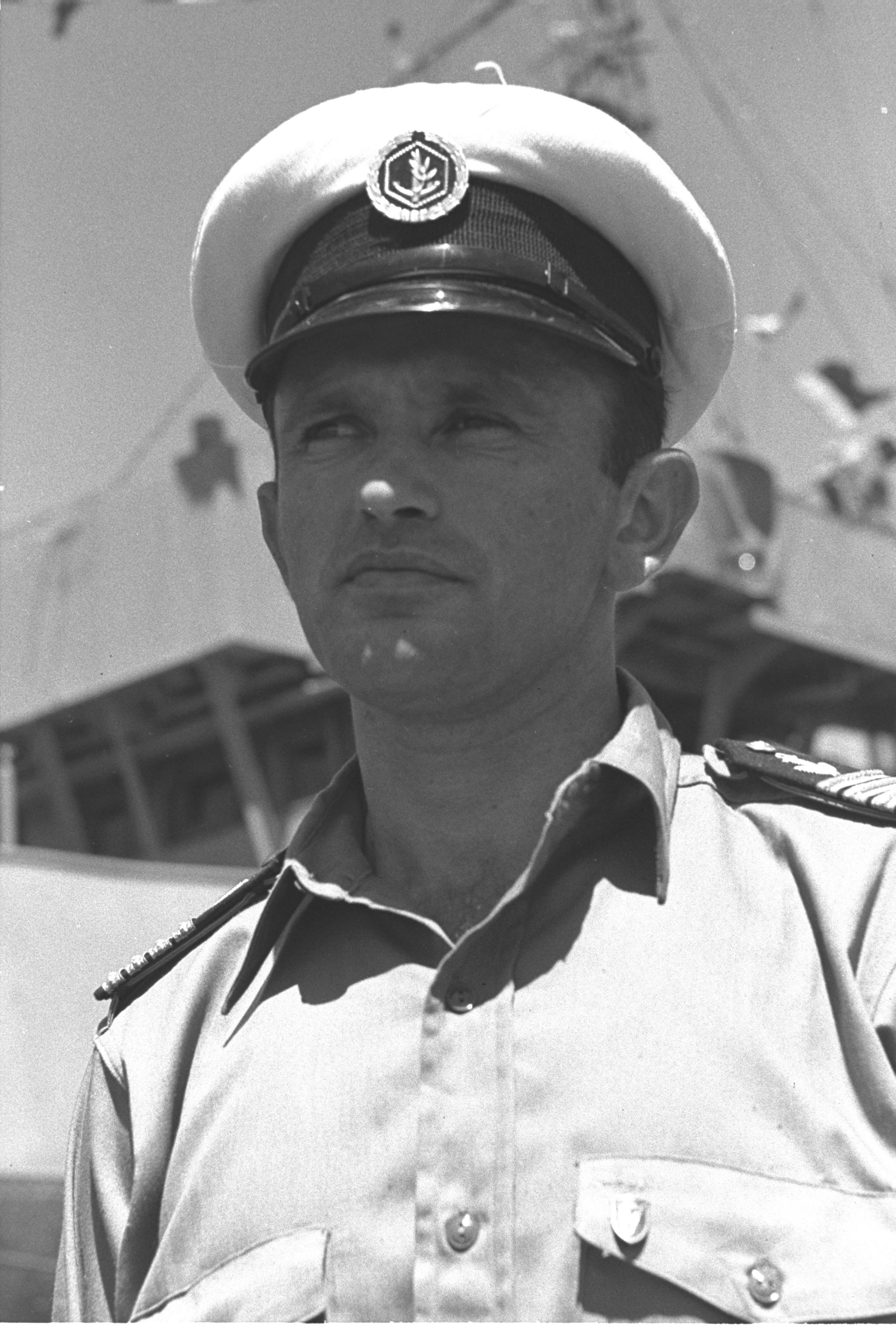
- Born: 15 June 1915; Berdychiv, Russian Empire
- Died: 19 May 2009 (aged 93); Tel Aviv, Israel
- Military career
- Allegiance: United Kingdom (1940–1946); Israel (from 1948)
- Branch: Haganah; British Army; Israeli Navy; Israeli Air Force
- Service years: 1929–1951
- Rank: Aluf
- Commands: Commander of the 7th Armored Brigade; Commander of the Israeli Navy; Commander of the Israeli Air Force
- Conflicts: 1936–1939 Arab revolt in Palestine; World War II; 1947–1949 Palestine war

Shlomo Shamir (Hebrew: שלמה שמיר; 15 June 1915 – 19 May 2009) was an Israeli military officer. He served as commander of the Israeli Navy (1949–1950) and subsequently as the commander of the Israeli Air Force (1950–1951).

== Early life ==
Shlomo Shamir was born Shlomo Rabinovitz to Jewish parents in Berdychiv, in the Russian Empire (now Ukraine). He immigrated to Mandatory Palestine with his family in 1925. In 1929 he joined the Haganah and was instrumental in smuggling weapons and illegal Jewish immigrants into Palestine during the time of the British Mandate and the White Paper of 1939. During the 1936–1939 Arab revolt in Palestine, he commanded Haganah reprisal raids against Arab villages, including a 1939 raid on Lubya in which four villagers were killed, and was involved in weapons production as well as the transfer of weapons around Palestine.

== World War II ==
In 1940 he received his pilot license after taking a flight course, and in the same year he enlisted in the British Army. He underwent an officer course and served in the Jewish Brigade following its establishment as an officer in its 2nd battalion. He saw action in the Italian campaign. Unofficially he was appointed the internal Haganah commander of all Jewish soldiers from Palestine in the British Army. He organized efforts to search for Holocaust survivors and bring them to Israel. This included a mission to find Enzo Sereni, an Italian Jewish leader who went missing during a mission to rescue Jews from Europe. In 1946 he was discharged from the British Army with the rank of major.

== War of Independence ==
After leaving the British Army Shamir was head of the Haganah's mission to the United States from 1946 to 1947. He served in the Israel Defense Forces during the 1948 Arab-Israeli War, during which he served as the first commander of the 7th Armored Brigade in the fight to conquer Latrun so as to open the road to Jerusalem. He presided over the construction of the Burma Road to relieve the siege of Jerusalem. He also recruited Mickey Marcus to join the Israel Defense Force. At the end of the war he was offered to be appointed as the Chief of the General Staff, but he refused. Instead he served other capacities, eventually becoming the second commander of the Israeli Navy in December 1949. He became the first Israeli Navy commander to receive the rank of Aluf.

== Israeli Navy and Air Force ==
Shamir helped build the small Israeli Navy by purchasing a new corvette and advanced torpedo boats. In 1950, he was replaced as Commander of the Israeli Navy by Mordechai Limon and became the third commander of the Israeli Air Force. Under his leadership, the Israeli Air Defense Network was created and the Hatzor Airbase was built. In August 1951, he handed command of the Air Force over to Haim Laskov and retired from the IDF.

== Civilian career ==
In civilian life, Shamir established Israel's phosphate mines and headed the Israel Land Authority. He received a master's degree in Social Sciences from Tel Aviv University and was a graduate of Harvard University AMP Program of 1970.

On 19 May 2009 Shamir died in Tel Aviv at the age of 93, leaving his daughter Yael, two grandchildren and one great-grandchild.

In 2014 his memoirs were collected and turned into an autobiography released in Hebrew called Three Miracles and a Hebrew Flag in the British Army. It was translated into English with new annotations and photograph in 2025 as Dance of the Fire: The Jewish Brigade in WW2: Facts, Myths, Appraisal and edited by his daughter.

== Publications ==
- "Dance of the Fire: The Jewish Brigade in WW2: Facts, Myths, Appraisal", Unicorn Publishing Group, 2025, ISBN 978-1-917458-31-3
- "...בכל מחיר - לירושלים", תל אביב: הוצאת מערכות ומשרד הביטחון - ההוצאה לאור, תשנ"ד-1994.
- "שלושה נסים ודגל עברי בצבא הבריטי", תל אביב: הוצאה לאור תשע"ד-2014, 343 עמ', מסת"ב 978-965-555-748-0
- הימאים עשו עלי רושם עז, 'מערכות ים' ל"ז-ל"ח, קובץ העשור לחיל הים, יולי 1958, עמ' 21.
- חיל מוצא את יעודו, ימים עלי ימים - מערכות חיל הים, מפקדת חיל הים, ספטמבר 1974, עמ' 15.
