= Mary Parker (American actress) =

American actress

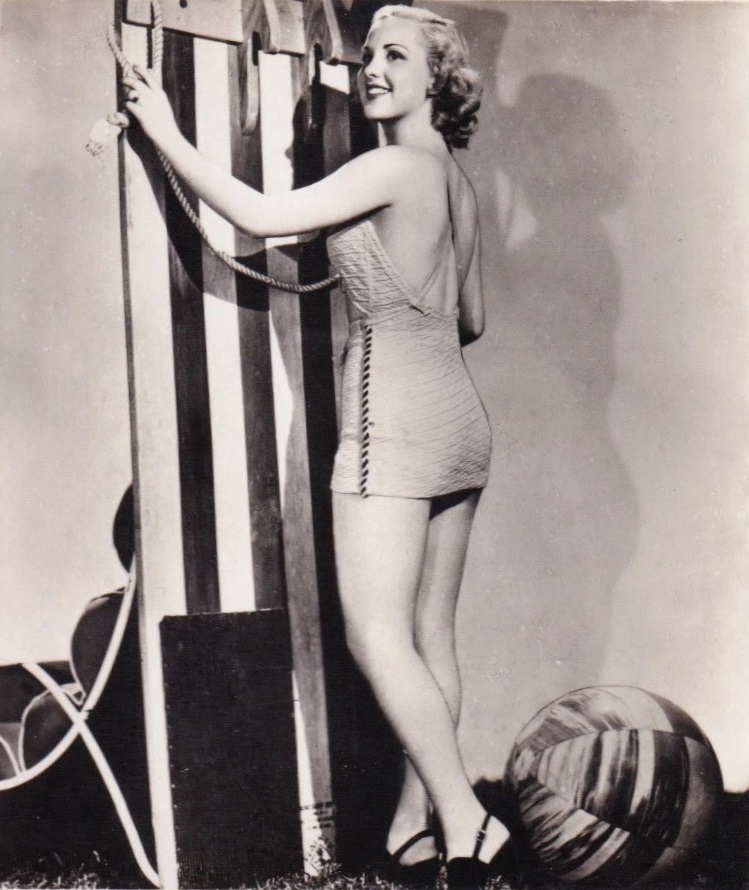
- Born: Mary Frances Roberson; August 28, 1918; Fort Worth, Texas, U.S.
- Died: March 2, 1998 (aged 79); Fort Worth, Texas, U.S.
- Occupations: Actress, dancer
- Years active: 1938–1950

Mary Parker (born Mary Frances Roberson; August 28, 1918 – March 2, 1998) was an American stage, television and screen actress/performer. Parker appeared in 17 films from 1938 to 1954, but was also known for her dance work with partner Billy Daniel.

== Life and career ==
Born in Fort Worth, Texas, Parker (also known as "Punkins" Parker), was a protégé of Mitchell Leisen. Leisen recruited Parker for various projects both on and off the screen starting in 1938. Parker was discovered while performing at the Casa Mañana Theatre in her native Fort Worth, Texas during the Texas Centennial celebrations and given a contract with Paramount Pictures. She performed in several large budget films, and was chosen by Paramount and Max Factor Jr. as "The Real Miss America", yet her fame was short lived.

In 1943, Parker signed a contract with MGM. Courtesy of MGM, in April 1944 Parker starred in a production of The Desert Song for the troops at Camp Roberts, California.

Parker and Daniels also performed in nightclubs. In those engagements, they specialized in "ballroom fairy tales", in which the dances told stories and each step of each dance was a component of the story that the dance told.

In 1944, Parker wed Lt. Richard B. Dixson, a decorated fighter pilot. They remained married a little over a year during World War II, and never remarried. She returned from Hollywood in the late 1940s and only made a few movies from that point (all bit parts). Her television show Mary Parker Playtime was a show for children in the Dallas/Fort Worth area.

She died in Fort Worth, Texas in 1998.

== Career ==
=== Selected filmography ===
- Music for Millions (1944) as Anita
- Lady in the Dark (1944) as Miss Parker
- Marie Green and Her Merry Men (1940/41)
- Ranch House Romeo (1939) as Mitzi
- Sudden Money (1939) as Ellen
- Cafe Society (1939) (uncredited) as Southern Girl
- St. Louis Blues (1939) as Punkins
- Artists and Models Abroad (1938) as Punkins

=== Stage ===
- Hit the Deck (1945 version); musical written by Vincent Youmans
- Let's Face It (1941–43); wartime musical, written by Cole Porter
- Abe Lincoln in Illinois (1939/40)

=== Television ===
- Mary Parker Playtime (Fort Worth, Texas) 1949/53 WBAP-5
- Dance Parade (Fort Worth, Texas) 1950/53 WBAP-5
