= Back to Paradise =

1987 single by 38 Special

Single by 38 Special

from the album Flashback: The Best of 38 Special
- Released: 1987
- Genre: Southern rock
- Length: 3:42
- Label: A&M
- Songwriters: Jim Vallance; Bryan Adams; Pat Benatar
- Producers: Don Barnes; Vallance

38 Special singles chronology
"Heart's on Fire" (1986)	"Back to Paradise" (1987)	"Rock & Roll Strategy" (1988)

Music video
- "Back to Paradise" on YouTube

"Back to Paradise" is a song by American rock band 38 Special. It appears on their compilation album Flashback: The Best of 38 Special (1987) and is the theme to the 1987 film Revenge of the Nerds II: Nerds in Paradise.

== Charts ==
Chart (1987)	Peak position
Canada (Canadian Hot 100)	49
US Billboard Hot 100	41
US Mainstream Rock (Billboard)	4
