= Teachers (film) =

1984 film by Arthur Hiller

- Theatrical release poster
- Directed by: Arthur Hiller
- Written by: W. R. McKinney
- Produced by: Art Levinson; Aaron Russo; Irwin Russo
- Starring: Nick Nolte; JoBeth Williams; Judd Hirsch; Ralph Macchio; Allen Garfield; Lee Grant; Richard Mulligan
- Cinematography: David M. Walsh
- Edited by: Don Zimmerman
- Production companies: United Artists; Aaron Russo Productions
- Distributed by: MGM/UA Entertainment Co.
- Release date: October 5, 1984
- Running time: 106 minutes
- Country: United States
- Language: English
- Budget: $9 million
- Box office: $27.7 million (US)

Teachers is a 1984 American satirical black comedy-drama film written by W. R. McKinney, directed by Arthur Hiller, and starring Nick Nolte, JoBeth Williams, Ralph Macchio, and Judd Hirsch. It was shot in Columbus, Ohio, mostly at the former Central High School.

The film is set primarily in a high school in Columbus, Ohio. The school is facing poor publicity due to a lawsuit by a former student, and the administration is pressuring a popular teacher to resign because they view him as a threat. The teacher stands up to his bosses and threatens them with another lawsuit if they fire him.

== Plot ==
On a typical Monday morning at John F. Kennedy High School in the inner city of Columbus, Ohio, there is conflict between teachers, a student with a stab wound, and talk of an upcoming lawsuit. Vice principal Roger Rubell and principal Eugene Horn meet with attorney Lisa Hammond, who is getting depositions, for a lawsuit against the school for graduating an illiterate student.

Alex Jurel is a veteran social studies teacher, popular because he can identify and connect with students. Alex has been worn down by years of coming between the rowdy students and the administration's pedantry. He is assigned to temporarily assume the duties of the school psychologist and becomes a mentor to student Eddie Pilikian. Alex also develops a romance with Lisa, his former student.

Herbert Gower is a mental institution outpatient who has been mistaken for a substitute teacher and placed in charge of a history class that he makes fun, educational, and engaging. Sleepy old English teacher Mr. Stiles does not actually teach his students but just hands out worksheets for his students to complete during class, and he dies unnoticed in his sleep while in class. Gym teacher Mr. Troy has a sexual relationship with a student; fearing her parents, she asks Alex to take her to have an abortion. Eddie's best friend Danny, a schizophrenic and kleptomaniac, is shot and killed by the police after he procures a gun during a drug search.

Superintendent Donna Burke and school lawyer Al Lewis are attempting to avoid bad publicity associated with the lawsuit. They try to determine which teachers might damage the school's reputation by their depositions. Herbert Gower is revealed to be a patient, not a teacher, but his removal is contested by his students, who were responding to his unorthdox-but-effective teaching methods.

Although the district settles the lawsuit, the administration believes Alex may expose their incompetence, the next public controversy. They try to force him out. He thinks he has no choice but to resign, but Lisa persuades him the school cannot risk anymore bad publicity. In front of the entire school body, he stands up to Burke and Rubell, reminding them that the school exists for students and not administrators and threatening a lawsuit if he is fired. He proudly walks back into the school to loud cheers from the students.

== Cast ==
- Nick Nolte as Alex Jurel
- JoBeth Williams as Lisa Hammond
- Judd Hirsch as Vice Principal Roger Rubell
- Ralph Macchio as Eddie Pilikian
- Allen Garfield as Carl Rosenberg
- Lee Grant as Dr. Donna Burke
- Richard Mulligan as Herbert Gower
- Royal Dano as Kenneth Stiles a.k.a. Ditto
- William Schallert as Principal Horn
- Art Metrano as Troy
- Laura Dern as Diane Warren
- Crispin Glover as Danny Reese
- Morgan Freeman as Alan Lewis
- Madeleine Sherwood as Grace Wensel
- Steven Hill as Sloan
- Zohra Lampert as Mrs. Pilikian
- Mary Alice as Linda Ganz
- Terry Ellis as Tim Hahn
- Ronald Hunter as Mr. Pilikian
- Virginia Capers as Landlady
- Ellen Crawford as Social Worker
- Vivian Bonnell as Nurse
- Cacey Kustosz as Field Trip Educator
- Anthony Heald as Narc
- Katharine Balfour as Theresa Bloom
- Jeff Ware as Malloy
- Richard Zobel as Propes
- Stephen Mendillo as Lecture Cop
- Julia Jennings as The Blonde
- George Dzundza as Paramedic (uncredited)

== Critical response ==
The film opened to mixed reviews, and some reviewers felt that it lacked the incisive touch of Paddy Chayefsky's satires. (Chayefsky had written Hiller's other dark satire, 1971's The Hospital).

On review aggregator Rotten Tomatoes, the film holds an approval rating of 62% based on 34 reviews. The website's critical consensus reads, "With moments of stinging satire undermined by jarring tonal shifts, Teachers offers an education in the limits of a strong cast's ability to prop up uneven writing." On Metacritic, the film received a score of 39 based on 8 reviews, indicating "generally unfavorable reviews".

Dave Kehr of the Chicago Reader remarked that "the characters [in the film] have all been invented for strictly didactic purposes: they come on waving their moral conflicts like big white bed sheets, and as soon as you see them you can predict every trite turn of the plot."

A critic for Variety said that the film "makes stinging, important points about the mess of secondary public education, but [that] those points are diluted gradually by an overload of comic absurdity."

Roger Ebert remarked that "the idea here was to do for teaching what M*A*S*H did for the war. Unfortunately, they've done for schools what General Hospital did for medicine. Teachers has an interesting central idea, about shell-shocked teachers trying to remember their early idealism, but the movie junks it up with so many sitcoms compromises that we can never quite believe the serious scenes." Ebert ended his review: "Here's the sad bottom line: Teachers was just interesting enough to convince me a great movie can be made about big-city high schools. This isn't it."

Pat Collins of the CBS Morning News remarked that "there's an overwhelming urge to take out a giant eraser and wipe the screen clean of what is absolutely the worst 'high school is a jungle' movie to come down the locker line corridor in a long time," singling out "the ham in the performances of the actors who have all done better in the past" before calling the film "a shrill, preachy and superficial treatment of the subject of public school education." Collins continued: "[T]eachers, students and parents in the real world don't need Hollywood to tell them what's wrong with the problems of public schools ... compared to Teachers, homework is more fun."

== Soundtrack ==
Teachers

Soundtrack album by various artists
- Released: 1 November 1984
- Studio: Various
- Genre: Rock
- Label: Capitol
- Producer: Aaron Russo

Professional ratings
Review scores
Source	Rating
AllMusic	3/5 stars

1. "Teacher, Teacher" - 38 Special
2. "One Foot Back in Your Door" - Roman Holliday
3. "Edge of a Dream" - Joe Cocker
4. "Interstate Love Affair" - Night Ranger
5. "Foolin' Around" - Freddie Mercury
6. "Cheap Sunglasses" - ZZ Top
7. "Understanding" - Bob Seger
8. "I Can't Stop the Fire" - Eric Martin & Friends
9. "In the Jungle (Concrete Jungle)" - The Motels
10. "(I'm the) Teacher" - Ian Hunter

The theme song by 38 Special was released as a single and reached No. 25 on the Billboard Hot 100 singles chart. "Understanding" by Seger reached No. 17 and Cocker's "Edge of a Dream" hit No. 69.

Cash Box said of Seger's "Understanding" that it "is by and large successful in bringing together a good, singable melody, meaningful lyrics, and superb performances" but said that the chorus "remains on one plateau and never fully takes hold."

U.S. hard-rock band Blue Öyster Cult was given the script for the film and were asked to write original songs, though the band never actually saw the film. Demo versions of three songs, which did not make the final soundtrack, were later released in BÖC archival releases: "Rebel," "Summa Cum Laude" and "Double Talk."
