= Like No Other Night =

1986 single by 38 Special

Single by 38 Special

from the album Strength in Numbers
- B-side: "Heart's on Fire"
- Released: 1986
- Recorded: 1985
- Genre: Southern rock; pop rock
- Length: 3:59
- Label: A&M
- Songwriters: Don Barnes; Jeff Carlisi; Jim Vallance; John Bettis
- Producer: Keith Olsen

38 Special singles chronology
"Teacher, Teacher" (1984)	"Like No Other Night" (1986)	"Somebody Like You" (1986)

Music video
- "Like No Other Night" on YouTube

"Like No Other Night" is a song by American rock band 38 Special and the lead single from their seventh studio album Strength in Numbers (1986).

== Critical reception ==
Mike DeGagne of AllMusic commented the song "can't compare to previous efforts like "If I'd Been the One," "Back Where You Belong," or "Teacher Teacher".

== Charts ==
Chart (1986)	Peak position
Canada (Canadian Hot 100)	80
US Billboard Hot 100	14
US Mainstream Rock (Billboard)	4
