= The Servant (1963 film) =

1963 British drama film by Joseph Losey

- Theatrical release poster
- Directed by: Joseph Losey
- Screenplay by: Harold Pinter
- Based on: The Servant (1948 novella) by Robin Maugham
- Produced by: Joseph Losey; Norman Priggen
- Starring: Dirk Bogarde; Sarah Miles; Wendy Craig; James Fox
- Cinematography: Douglas Slocombe
- Edited by: Reginald Mills
- Music by: John Dankworth
- Production company: Springbok Films
- Distributed by: Warner-Pathé
- Release dates: September 1963 (Venice); 14 November 1963 (London)
- Running time: 115 minutes
- Country: United Kingdom
- Language: English
- Budget: £138,005
- Box office: £389,276

The Servant is a 1963 British psychological drama film directed and produced by Joseph Losey from a screenplay by Harold Pinter, who adapted Robin Maugham's 1948 novella. It stars Dirk Bogarde, Sarah Miles, Wendy Craig and James Fox. The first of Pinter's three film collaborations with Losey, The Servant is a tightly constructed film about the psychological relationships among the four central characters and examines issues relating to social class.

At the 24th Venice International Film Festival, the film competed for the Golden Lion. It was released in the U.K. by Warner-Pathé on November 14, 1963 to highly positive reviews. It won three BAFTA Awards including Best British Actor for Bogarde, and was nominated in five other categories including Best Film and Best British Film.

In 1999, the British Film Institute ranked The Servant as the 22nd-greatest British film of all time.

== Plot ==
Tony, a wealthy Londoner, who says that he is part of a plan to build cities in Brazil, moves into his new house and hires Hugo Barrett as his manservant. Barrett appears to take easily to his new job, and he and Tony form a quiet bond, retaining their social roles. Relationships begin shifting, however, when Tony's girlfriend Susan meets Barrett. She is suspicious of Barrett and asks Tony to dismiss him, but he refuses.

To bring his lover, Vera, into his world, Barrett convinces Tony that the house also needs a maid. When Tony finally agrees, Barrett hires Vera on the pretext that she is his sister. Barrett encourages Vera to seduce Tony. Later, when Tony and Susan return early from a vacation, they find Barrett and Vera sleeping together. Believing that the two are siblings, he flies into a rage at Barrett, who then reveals that they are not related and she is his fiancée. He and Vera then make it clear that Tony was sleeping with her, to Susan's dismay. After Tony dismisses them, Vera departs, humming "The Wedding March."

At this point, Tony has become reliant on Barrett and Vera. He becomes a drunkard, which is exacerbated by Susan's refusal to answer his calls. Eventually, Tony encounters Barrett in a pub, who spins a tale about Vera having made fools of them both. He begs Tony to re-engage him as his manservant, and he agrees.

Gradually the two reverse roles, with Barrett taking more control and Tony retreating into infantilism. Barrett also insinuates Vera back into the house. Susan arrives and attempts to convince Tony to come back to her. She finds him totally dependent on Barrett who keeps him supplied with alcohol and prostitutes. She walks through the sordid scene, and suddenly kisses Barrett, who forcefully returns her attentions. As he grows more brutal, Susan struggles to free herself from his embrace, and Tony, rising from his drunken stupor, attempts to intervene. However, he trips and falls onto the floor, causing all the prostitutes to laugh at him. Tony then has an outburst and Barrett orders everyone to leave. Before departing, Susan slaps Barrett with the jeweled collar of her coat. Barrett is shocked, but quickly recovers and places her coat on her shoulder as she leaves. He then walks upstairs where Vera is waiting for him, passing Tony, who is slumped on the ground and clutching a drink.

== Cast ==
- Dirk Bogarde as Hugo Barrett
- James Fox as Tony
- Sarah Miles as Vera
- Wendy Craig as Susan Stewart
- Catherine Lacey as Lady Agatha Mounset
- Richard Vernon as Lord Willie Mounset
- Patrick Magee as bishop (restaurant)
- Alun Owen as curate (restaurant)
- Doris Nolan as older woman (restaurant)
- Jill Melford as younger woman (restaurant)
- Ann Firbank as society woman (restaurant)
- Harold Pinter as society man (restaurant)
- Dorothy Bromiley as girl outside Phone Box
- Johnny Dankworth as jazz bandleader
- Davy Graham as himself (pub)

== Production ==
The Servant was directed by Joseph Losey, an American director who spent the last part of his career and life in England, after being blacklisted by Hollywood in the 1950s. His health was poor during production, causing Bogarde to provide significant assistance with the direction and finishing the film.

The film is based on The Servant, a 1948 Robin Maugham novella. The screenplay, written by Harold Pinter, stripped the plot to a more economical and chilling storyline. Pinter also appeared in the film, as a restaurant patron in one scene with a speaking part.

Writing for the British Film Institute, film critic Nick James noted:

It was Losey who first showed Robin Maugham's novella The Servant to Bogarde in 1954. Originally separately commissioned by director Michael Anderson, Pinter stripped it of its first-person narrator, its yellow book snobbery, and the arguably antisemitic characterisation of Barrett—oiliness, heavy lids—replacing them with an economical language that implied rather than stated the slippage of power relations away from Tony towards Barrett.

Losey's other collaborations with Pinter, Accident and The Go-Between, share a resemblance to The Servant in that these offer the same savage indictment of the waning English class system, a theme which had been rarely addressed in British cinema.

== Music ==
The soundtrack by John Dankworth includes the song "All Gone", sung by his wife Cleo Laine. Her three different renditions of the song provide distinct emotional impacts throughout the film.

== Release ==
The film was shown at the 24th Venice International Film Festival in September 1963. It was also selected to represent Britain at the first New York Film Festival the same month, with Losey returning to the United States for the first time in 10 years to attend the festival.

The film opened at London's Warner Theatre on 14 November 1963.

It was re-released in 2013 to mark its 50th anniversary.

=== Home media ===
In 2001, The Servant was released on DVD by Anchor Bay Entertainment. In June 2023, a 4K digital restoration of the film was released on Blu-ray and DVD by the Criterion Collection.

== Reception ==
=== Box Office ===
The film grossed £238,893 in the United Kingdom and £150,383 overseas for a worldwide total of £389,276.

=== Critical response ===
Upon release, Variety commended the film for its direction, acting and the "sharp incisive dialog" in Pinter's screenplay, writing: "The Servant is for the most part strong dramatic fare, though the atmosphere and tension is not fully sustained to the end." They also noted "the standout performance by Bogarde, for whom the role of the servant is offbeat casting" and "the noteworthy performance of James Fox, a newcomer with confident flair, who assuredly suggests the indolent young man about town."

Penelope Gilliatt of The Observer called it "a triumph" and wrote "the thing that is most exhilarating about the film is that it has been written by someone who is obviously excited by the cinema and made by someone who obviously respects words". Richard Roud writing in The Guardian and Ann Pacey of the Daily Herald said it was "a masterpiece". In 2013, the Los Angeles Times film critic suggested that The Servant was the coldest film ever made, calling it "brilliantly icy".

On the review aggregator website Rotten Tomatoes, it holds a rating of 90% and an average rating of 8.2/10 from 52 reviews. The website's consensus reads, "Thanks in no small part to stellar work from director Joseph Losey and screenwriter Harold Pinter, The Servant strikes at class divisions with artful precision." On Metacritic, it holds an average rating of 94/100, based on the reviews of nine critics.

=== Retrospective appraisal ===
"In the spirit of Brecht and Meyerhold, the movie's rejection of a passive, purely observational style and its creative use of sound, framing and editing, sensitized audiences not just to the destructive relations inside the master's London home, but to those of British society at large." (Robert Maras in the World Socialist Web Site). Maras also noted that "The Servant was widely praised in European filmmaking circles and helped encourage a period of greater social and psychological realism in British cinema," while Dan Callahan, writing in Senses of Cinema (2003), reports that the film "consolidated Losey's reputation internationally".

However, though for film historian David Thomson "The Servant marked Losey's coming of age among the artistic elite ... the man who had made The Prowler and M as gripping, low-budget thrillers was now working in a world ready to acclaim his seriousness," he commented on the downside how "some critics praised the subtlety and ignored the hysteria in The Servant. That was a disservice to Losey, whose strength had always been a fusion of the two."

In 1999, the British Film Institute ranked The Servant as the 22nd-greatest British film of all time.

=== Awards and nominations ===
Award	Year	Category	Nominee	Result
British Academy Film Awards	1964	Best Film	The Servant	Nominated
British Academy Film Awards	1964	Best British Film	The Servant	Nominated
British Academy Film Awards	1964	Best British Screenplay	Harold Pinter	Nominated
British Academy Film Awards	1964	Best British Actor	Dirk Bogarde	Won
British Academy Film Awards	1964	Best British Actress	Sarah Miles	Nominated
British Academy Film Awards	1964	Most Promising Newcomer to Leading Film Roles	James Fox	Won
British Academy Film Awards	1964	Most Promising Newcomer to Leading Film Roles	Wendy Craig	Nominated
British Academy Film Awards	1964	Best British Cinematography (Black-and-White)	Douglas Slocombe	Won
British Society of Cinematographers	1963	Best Cinematography in a Theatrical Feature Film	Douglas Slocombe	Won
Cahiers du Cinéma	1964	Annual Top 10 Lists	Joseph Losey	10th place
Nastro d'Argento	1966	Best Foreign Director	Joseph Losey	Won
New York Film Critics Circle	1964	Best Director	Joseph Losey	Nominated
New York Film Critics Circle	1964	Best Screenplay	Harold Pinter	Won
New York Film Critics Circle	1964	Best Actor	Dirk Bogarde	Nominated
Venice Film Festival	1963	Golden Lion	Joseph Losey	Nominated
Writers' Guild of Great Britain	1964	Best Dramatic Screenplay	Harold Pinter	Won

== See also ==
- BFI Top 100 British films
- London in film
- List of cult films

== Sources ==
- Callahan, Dan. 2003. Losey, Joseph. Senses of Cinema, March 2003. Great Directors Issue 25.https://www.sensesofcinema.com/2003/great-directors/losey/#:~:text=The%20dominant%20themes%20of%20Losey's,love%20story%20in%20his%20films. Accessed 12 October 2024.
- Hirsch, Foster. 1980. Joseph Losey. Twayne Publishers, Boston, Massachusetts. ISBN 0-8057-9257-0
- Maras, Robert. 2012. Dissecting class relations: The film collaborations of Joseph Losey and Harold Pinter. World Socialist Web Site, May 28, 2012. https://www.wsws.org/en/articles/2012/05/lose-m28.html Accessed 12 October 2024.
- Palmer, James and Riley, Michael. 1993. The Films of Joseph Losey. Cambridge University Press, Cambridge, England. ISBN 0-521-38386-2
- Sanjek, David. 2002. Cold, Cold Heart: Joseph Losey’s The Damned and the Compensations of Genre. Senses of Cinema, July 2002. Director: Joseph Losey Issue 21.https://www.sensesofcinema.com/2002/director-joseph-losey/losey_damned/ Accessed 10 October 2024.
- Thomson, David. 1981. A Biographical Dictionary of Film. William Morrow and Company, New York. ISBN 978-0688001322
- Dixon, Wheeler Winston. 2014. Hollywood Exiles in Europe. Film International, February 3, 2014. https://filmint.nu/hollywood-exiles-in-europe/ Accessed 10 October 2024.
