= Cast a Giant Shadow =

1966 film by Melville Shavelson

- Film poster by Howard Terpning
- Directed by: Melville Shavelson
- Written by: Ted Berkman (book); Melville Shavelson (screenplay)
- Produced by: Melville Shavelson
- Starring: Kirk Douglas; Senta Berger; Angie Dickinson; James Donald; Stathis Giallelis; Luther Adler; Frank Sinatra; Yul Brynner; John Wayne
- Cinematography: Aldo Tonti
- Edited by: Bert Bates; Gene Ruggiero
- Music by: Elmer Bernstein
- Production companies: Batjac Productions; The Mirisch Corporation; Llenroc Productions
- Distributed by: United Artists
- Release date: March 30, 1966
- Running time: 146 minutes
- Country: United States
- Language: English
- Box office: $3.5 million (est. US/Canada rentals)

Cast a Giant Shadow is a 1966 American action film based on the life of Colonel Mickey Marcus, and stars Kirk Douglas, Senta Berger, Yul Brynner, John Wayne, Frank Sinatra and Angie Dickinson. Melville Shavelson adapted, produced and directed. The film is a fictionalized account of the experiences of an historic Jewish-American military officer, Colonel David "Mickey" Marcus, who commanded units of the fledgling Israel Defense Forces during the 1948 Arab–Israeli War.

== Plot ==
Marcus is an Army Reserve Colonel in the Judge Advocate General's Corps, who was recently released from active duty and is now working in New York City. He is approached by a Haganah agent, Major Safir, who requests his assistance in preparing Israeli troops to defend the newly declared State against an invasion by its Arab neighbors.

Marcus is refused permission by The Pentagon to go, unless he travels as a civilian. The Haganah gives him a false passport with the alias "Michael Stone". As "Michael Stone", he arrives in Israel to be met by a Haganah member, Magda Simon.

Marcus, who parachuted into occupied France during World War II and helped to organize the relief mission for one of the first Nazi concentration camps liberated by American troops, is initially viewed with suspicion by some Haganah soldiers. But after he leads a commando raid on an Arab arms dump and assists in a landing of illegal refugees, he is more accepted. After preparing training manuals for the troops, he returns to New York, where his wife has suffered a miscarriage.

Despite his wife's pleadings, he returns to Israel and is given command of the Jerusalem front with the rank of 'Aluf' (General), a rank not used since biblical days. He sets to work, recognising that, while the men under his command do not have proper training or weapons or even a system of ranks, they do have spirit and determination. He organises the construction of the "Burma Road", bypassing Latrun, to enable convoys to reach besieged Jerusalem, where the population is on the verge of starvation.

Many of the soldiers under his command are newly arrived in Israel, determined and enthusiastic but untrained. Dubbing them 'the schnooks', Marcus is inspired by them to discover that he is proud to be a Jew. But, just before the convoy of trucks to Jerusalem starts out, he is shot and killed by a lone sentry who does not speak English—the last casualty before the United Nations impose a truce. The coffin containing his body is carried down the "Burma Road" by an honor guard of the soldiers he trained and inspired.

== Cast ==
Kirk Douglas and Yul Brynner on set

- Kirk Douglas as David "Mickey" Marcus
- Angie Dickinson as Emma Marcus
- Senta Berger as Magda Simon
- James Donald as Maj. Safir
- Yul Brynner as Asher
- Stathis Giallelis as Ram Oren
- John Wayne as General Mike Randolph
- Frank Sinatra as Vince Talmadge
- Luther Adler as Jacob Zion
- Michael Shillo as Andre Simon
- Ruth White as Mrs. Chaison
- Rina Ganor as Rona
- Gordon Jackson as McAffee
- Topol as Abou Ibn Kader
- Michael Douglas as Jeep Driver (uncredited)
- Allan Cuthbertson as Immigration Officer
- Michael Hordern as British Ambassador
- Jeremy Kemp as Senior British Officer
- Sean Barrett as Junior British Officer
- Roland Bartrop as Bert Harrison
- Robert Gardett as General Walsh
- Michael Balston as 1st Sentry
- Robert Ross as Aide to Chief of Staff
- Rod Dana as Aide to Gen. Randolph
- Dan Sturkie as Jump Sergeant
- Hillel Rave as Yaakov
- Shlomo Hermon as Yussuff
- Arthur Hansel as Pentagon Officer
- Claude Aliotti as 2nd Sentry
- Micha Shagrir as Truck Driver
- Frank Latimore as 1st U.N. Officer
- Ken Buckle as 2nd U.N. Officer
- Vera Dolen as Mrs. Martinson (scenes deleted)
- Gary Merrill as Pentagon Chief of Staff (scenes deleted)
- Geoffrey Palmer as David (uncredited)
- Danny Perlman as Jeep Driver (uncredited)
- Jimmy Shaw as Jeep Driver (uncredited)
- Samra Dedes as Belly Dancer

Cameo roles (listed as Special Appearances Cast) include:

- John Wayne as 'the General', Marcus's commanding officer in the Second World War and now a senior general officer at the Pentagon, who initially refused him permission to go, but later supports him.
- Yul Brynner as Asher, a Haganah commander.
- Frank Sinatra as Vince Talmadge, an expatriate American pilot who takes part in what becomes a suicide mission to bomb Arab positions.

== Production ==
Mel Shavelson first wrote a treatment about Mickey Marcus in 1948, but no studios were interested because of the film industry's reluctance to deal with Jewish subjects, as well as fear that theaters in Egypt might be expropriated. In a New York Times interview, Shavelson also alleged a lingering "pogrom mentality" among some Jewish executives who did not wish to draw attention to the Jewish background of Marcus and the events.

Shavelson acquired the film rights to Berkman's novel Cast a Great Shadow for $12,500 after it was dropped by Metro-Goldwyn-Mayer. Shavelson enlisted the support of John Wayne, and with his help, it was financed and distributed by United Artists.

Originally George Segal was planned to be cast as Mickey Marcus alongside Diana Hyland as Emma Marcus and either Claudia Cardinale or Daliah Lavi as Magda Simon. Carolyn Jones and Richard Harris were also considered for roles in the film. The film was meant to include depictions of leaders Harry S. Truman, George S. Patton, Maxwell D. Taylor, and David Ben-Gurion. Originally the young Michael Douglas was intended to play the sentry who shoots Marcus at the end of the film, but this was cut because he was the lead actor's son and the idea was deemed gimmicky.

Principal photography began on May 18, 1965, in Israel after several weeks of location shoots in New York City. Early planning also called for scenes to be filmed in France and Washington D.C., but this did not occur. Both Macy's Herald Square and Marcus's actual house in Brooklyn were shown in the film. Shooting took place at Jerusalem, the Negev, Nazareth, Galilee, and Palmachim. Israeli Army soldiers were used as extras, and as a result the filming was frequently disrupted by events of the continuing Arab–Israeli conflict. Soldiers were called away to fight skirmishes against Jordan or Palestinian fedayeen. The final week of production took place in Italy, where some interior scenes were already being filmed, because of housing shortages in Israel and a mistake which had led to the crew's hotel reservations in Tel Aviv expiring one week early. Filming took place at the Cinecittà Studios in Rome, while the Battle of Jerusalem scenes were shot at the Alban Hills in Frascati.

== Reception ==
The New York Times criticized the film, specifically the directing, calling it a "confusing, often superficial biography that leans a good deal on comic or extremely salty dialogues and effects." The reviewer said that In trying to fuse the many aspects of Marcus' life "into a titanic figure, what evolves, sadly, is an amalgam of all manufactured movie heroes." It received a poor reception at the San Sebastian International Film Festival, where critics called the film "one more war feature with not much technical value." A reviewer at the Louisville Courier-Journal called it "a phony and a noisy bore" featuring "the sorriest of film cliches, and the hollowest of romantic clap-trap."

The New York Daily News gave the film four stars and called it a "rousing adventure picture" and a "drama of historical significance and of human interest."

In 2006, Andrew Wolf from the New York Sun praised the filmmakers for the pro-Jewishness of the film, something he believes could not be done in modern Hollywood. However he referred to it as an "awful film" from a technical standpoint and heavily criticized the fictitious love interest subplot.

It was released on DVD in early 2000s but went out of print. It was rereleased on DVD, and on Blu-ray on August 26, 2014.

Giving it a mild recommendation, DVD Talk said "the cast does work that is better than the script they've been provided."

== See also ==
- List of American films of 1966
- John Wayne filmography
