= Music for Millions =

1944 film by Henry Koster

- Directed by: Henry Koster
- Written by: Myles Connolly
- Produced by: Joe Pasternak
- Starring: Margaret O'Brien; José Iturbi; Jimmy Durante; June Allyson; Marsha Hunt; Hugh Herbert; Harry Davenport; Marie Wilson
- Cinematography: Robert Surtees
- Edited by: Douglass Biggs
- Music by: Michel Michelet
- Production company: Metro-Goldwyn-Mayer
- Distributed by: Loew's Inc.
- Release date: December 18, 1944
- Running time: 115 minutes
- Country: United States
- Language: English
- Budget: $1,744,000
- Box office: $3,845,000

Music for Millions is a 1944 musical comedy film directed by Henry Koster and starring Margaret O'Brien, José Iturbi, Jimmy Durante, June Allyson, Marsha Hunt, Hugh Herbert, Harry Davenport, and Marie Wilson. It was nominated for an Oscar for Best Original Screenplay in 1946.

== Plot ==
"Mike", age 6, arrives in New York to stay with her pregnant older sister Barbara Ainsworth, who lives together with a group of young women, her co-players in a symphony orchestra. As the orchestra prepares to go on a tour of army camps, a telegram is received informing them of the death of Barbara's soldier husband in the Pacific war theater. The girls decide to keep the tragic news from her until after her baby is born. The orchestra is shown playing several classical standards before various military audiences. The talented Iturbi variously conducts the group as well as effortlessly plays difficult piano pieces, while Durante sings comically and acts as a grandfather figure to Mike. In a surprise ending, shortly before giving birth, Barbara receives a letter from her husband saying he is in good spirits and convalescing in a military hospital.

== Cast ==
- Margaret O'Brien as Mike
- José Iturbi as himself
- Jimmy Durante as Andrews
- June Allyson as Barbara Ainsworth
- Marsha Hunt as Rosalind
- Hugh Herbert as Uncle Ferdinand
- Harry Davenport as Doctor
- Marie Wilson as Marie
- Larry Adler as Larry
- Ben Lessy as Kickebush
- Connie Gilchrist as Travelers Aid Woman
- Katharine Balfour as Elsa
- Helen Gilbert as Helen
- Mary Parker as Anita
- Madeleine Lebeau as Jane
- Ethel Griffies as Mrs. McGuff
- Eddie Jackson as Singer
- Jack Roth as Drummer
- Ed Wynn
- Lillian Yarbo as Jessie (uncredited)

== Soundtrack ==
- Clair de Lune
  - Music by Claude Debussy
  - Performed by Larry Adler on harmonica
  - Also performed by José Iturbi on piano
- Antonín Dvořák's Symphony No. 9 in E minor, 4th movement, conducted by José Iturbi
- Piano Concerto in A Minor
  - Music by Edvard Grieg
  - Performed by José Iturbi
- The March of the Toys
  - from Babes in Toyland
  - Music by Victor Herbert
- Waltz in E Minor
  - Music by Frédéric Chopin
  - Performed by José Iturbi
- Hallelujah Chorus
  - from The Messiah
  - Music by Georg Friedrich Händel
- Toscanini, Iturbi and Me
  - Written by Harold Spina, Walter Bullock and Jimmy Durante
- At Sundown
  - Written by Walter Donaldson
- Umbriago
  - Written by Jimmy Durante and Irving Caesar
- Jam Session
  - Music by Calvin Jackson

== Reception ==
According to MGM records, the film earned $2,341,000 in the US and Canada and $1,504,000 elsewhere, resulting in a profit of $824,000.
