= 17th British Academy Film Awards =

1964 film awards ceremony

- Date: 1964

Highlights
- Best Film: Tom Jones
- Best British Film: Tom Jones
- Most awards: The Servant & Tom Jones (3)
- Most nominations: The Servant (8)

The 17th British Academy Film Awards, given by the British Academy of Film and Television Arts in 1964, honoured the best films of 1963.

== Winners and nominees ==
=== Best Film ===
Tom Jones

- 8½
- Billy Liar
- David and Lisa
- Hud
- Days of Wine and Roses
- The Servant
- This Sporting Life
- To Kill a Mockingbird
- Divorce, Italian Style
- The Four Days of Naples
- Knife in the Water

=== Best British Film ===
Tom Jones

- Billy Liar
- The Servant
- This Sporting Life

=== Best Foreign Actor ===
Marcello Mastroianni in Divorce, Italian Style

- Howard Da Silva in David and Lisa
- Jack Lemmon in Days of Wine and Roses
- Paul Newman in Hud
- Gregory Peck in To Kill a Mockingbird

=== Best British Actor ===
Dirk Bogarde in The Servant

- Tom Courtenay in Billy Liar
- Richard Harris in This Sporting Life
- Albert Finney in Tom Jones
- Hugh Griffith in Tom Jones

=== Best British Actress ===
Rachel Roberts in This Sporting Life

- Julie Christie in Billy Liar
- Sarah Miles in The Servant
- Edith Evans in Tom Jones
- Barbara Windsor in Sparrows Can't Sing

=== Best Foreign Actress ===
Patricia Neal in Hud

- Lee Remick in Days of Wine and Roses
- Daniela Rocca in Divorce, Italian Style
- Joan Crawford in What Ever Happened to Baby Jane?
- Bette Davis in What Ever Happened to Baby Jane?

=== Best British Screenplay ===
Tom Jones - John Osborne

=== Best Animated Film ===
Automania 2000 and The Critic
