= Revenge of the Nerds II: Nerds in Paradise =

1987 film by Joe Roth

- Theatrical release poster
- Directed by: Joe Roth
- Written by: Dan Guntzelman; Steve Marshall
- Based on: Characters by: Tim Metcalfe; Miguel Tejada-Flores; Steve Zacharias; Jeff Buhai
- Produced by: Ted Field; Robert W. Cort; Peter Bart
- Starring: Robert Carradine; Anthony Edwards
- Cinematography: Charles Correll
- Edited by: Richard Chew
- Music by: Mark Mothersbaugh; Gerald V. Casale
- Production companies: 20th Century Fox; Interscope Communications; Amercent Films; American Entertainment Partners L.P.
- Distributed by: 20th Century Fox
- Release date: July 10, 1987
- Running time: 89 minutes
- Country: United States
- Language: English
- Budget: $10 million
- Box office: $30.1 million

Revenge of the Nerds II: Nerds in Paradise is a 1987 American comedy film, a sequel to Revenge of the Nerds (1984), and the second installment in the Revenge of the Nerds series. Its cast features most of the main actors from its predecessor, including Robert Carradine, Anthony Edwards (in a smaller role), Curtis Armstrong, Larry B. Scott, Timothy Busfield, Donald Gibb, and Andrew Cassese. This film also provided an early starring role for Courtney Thorne-Smith. Other cast members include Bradley Whitford, Ed Lauter, and Barry Sobel.

One of the movie trailers parodies the trailer of Poltergeist II: The Other Side. In the Nerds version, Robert Carradine's character, Lewis, turns and says "We're back!" and laughs. 38 Special provided the title track "Back to Paradise". The film was followed by Revenge of the Nerds III: The Next Generation (1992).

== Plot ==
Members of the Lambda Lambda Lambda (Tri-Lambs) fraternity of Adams College—proud nerd Lewis Skolnick, shy genius Arnold Poindexter, child prodigy Harold Wormser, lewd misfit Dudley "Booger" Dawson, and flamboyant Lamar Latrelle—travel to the United Fraternity national convention in Fort Lauderdale, Florida. Upon arriving at the luxurious Royal Flamingo Hotel, the Tri-Lambs discover that their reserved rooms have been reassigned to members of the national Alpha Beta fraternity by the acting manager, Buzz, who does not want nerds staying at his hotel. The receptionist, Sunny Carstairs, unsuccessfully attempts to persuade him to reconsider. Poindexter secures alternative accommodations at the Hotel Coral Essex, but the group soon discovers it is a dilapidated property in a rough neighborhood. Meanwhile, the Alpha Betas—led by local president Roger Latimer and joined by Ogre from Adams College—plot to drive the Tri-Lambs from the conference.

Roger gives the Tri-Lambs incorrect directions to a pre-conference barbecue, leading them into a trap in which they believe they are surrounded by a tribe of Seminole Indians conducting a ritualistic killing. The disguised Alpha Betas force the Tri-Lambs to strip to their underwear before chasing them away, humiliating them publicly. Despite this, the Tri-Lambs refuse to withdraw from the convention and confront Buzz and the Alpha Betas after Buzz fires the hotel bellboy, Stewart, for objecting to his sexual harassment of Sunny.

In retaliation, Roger proposes "Proposition 15", a bylaw requiring fraternities to meet both academic and physical standards, effectively targeting the intellectually gifted but physically unimposing Tri-Lambs. Determined to fight back, the Tri-Lambs host a party at the Coral Essex and perform a musical number opposing the measure, winning over the delegates and defeating the proposal. Roger then feigns reconciliation, offering to introduce a new bylaw stating that any fraternity found guilty of criminal conduct will be expelled from the conference and have its charter revoked.

Trusting Roger's apparent goodwill, the Tri-Lambs accept an invitation to stay in a luxury suite at the Royal Flamingo. Roger subsequently arranges for Sunny and two other women to take the Tri-Lambs to the beach in his car. After Sunny and Lewis grow closer, Roger's women persuade the Tri-Lambs to borrow Roger's car to buy beer, unaware that Roger has reported it stolen. The Tri-Lambs are arrested.

Sunny and Stewart bail them out of jail. Disillusioned and convinced that Sunny was complicit, Lewis announces his intention to abandon the conference. The Alpha Betas then kidnap the Tri-Lambs, Sunny, and Stewart, abandoning the men on an uninhabited island; disgusted by Roger's actions, Sunny chooses to stay with the Tri-Lambs. Fearing Ogre may boast about the scheme, the Alpha Betas throw him overboard as well, despite him being unable to swim, but Wormser rescues him. After sharing marijuana, the Tri-Lambs and Ogre realize they have more in common than they thought. That night, Lewis dreams of his friend Gilbert Lowe, who encourages him not to give up and to reconsider his mistrust of Sunny. The next morning, Lewis apologizes to Sunny and inspires the group to escape the island. They discover a hidden cache of military equipment, including an amphibious vehicle.

As Roger presides over a vote to expel the Tri-Lambs, they dramatically crash the conference, driving the amphibious vehicle through the wall before plunging into the hotel pool. Sunny exposes Roger's plot to the delegates, and Lewis punches Roger into the water. The crowd cheers before Lewis and Sunny kiss.

Back at Adams College, Lewis and Gilbert preside over an induction ceremony welcoming Ogre as the newest member of Lambda Lambda Lambda.

== Cast ==
- Robert Carradine as Lewis Skolnick
- Anthony Edwards as Gilbert Lowe
- Curtis Armstrong as Dudley "Booger" Dawson
- Larry B. Scott as Lamar Latrelle
- Timothy Busfield as Arnold Poindexter
- Andrew Cassese as Harold Wormser
- Courtney Thorne-Smith as Sunny Carstairs
- Bradley Whitford as Roger Latimer
- Barry Sobel as Stewart
- James Cromwell as Mr. Skolnick
- Ed Lauter as "Buzz"
- James Hong as Edgar Poe "Snotty" Wong
- Donald Gibb as Frederick Aloysius "Ogre" Palowaski
- Tom Hodges as "Tiny"
- Jack Gilpin as Mr. Comstock
- Michael Fitzgerald as "Pot Roast"

This is the only Nerds film in which Betty does not appear, although a picture of her is at the beginning of the film. Stan Gable, Takashi, and U.N. Jefferson also do not appear. This is the last Nerds film to feature Poindexter. Although he is shown on the DVD cover of the fourth film, he is not seen nor mentioned in it. This is also the last Nerds film to include Anthony Edwards as Gilbert and Andrew Cassese as Wormser. Edwards did not like the script and was very reluctant to reprise his role, and only agreed to return when his scenes were scheduled to be filmed very quickly and without any location filming. The script was changed so Gilbert had a broken leg, which enabled Edwards to film almost all of his material in one session, and he spent a few days filming the scene where he appears in Lewis's dream. They are played by other actors in the third film and stay offscreen in the fourth film.

At a 30th anniversary of the original film in 2014, Julia Montgomery (Betty) said that she was originally to have a part in Nerds II, but eventually declined after learning that her only scene would involve Betty cheating on Lewis in a hotel room with another jock. Montgomery said that after falling in love with Lewis in the first film, that it was wrong that she would cheat on him with someone who was just like Stan Gable.

== Production ==
Upon gaining presidency of 20th Century Fox, Leonard Goldberg's first act was to green light a sequel to Revenge of the Nerds in a stark reversal of the previous studio head's "no sequels" policy, believing a sequel to Revenge of the Nerds was a "no brainer". While there was no indication original Nerds director Jeff Kanew was offered to direct, Kanew had been vocal in his opposition to a sequel and was quoted saying "It's done, the nerds won. What are you going to do? Have them win again?" Joe Roth was hired as director for Revenge of the Nerds II despite having no prior directing experience, because he was well liked by the studio administration and had a reputation for efficiency. Script writing duties were assigned to Dan Guntzelman and Steve Marshall who were best known for serving as writers on the sitcom Growing Pains.

While Robert Carradine, Curtis Armstrong, Larry B. Scott, Timothy Busfield, Donald Gibb, and Andrew Cassese reprised their roles from the first film, Anthony Edwards only returned in a cameo appearance as he was reportedly busy with another film with the producers not all that concerned by Edwards absence as they considered him the least funny character in the original film. Brian Tochi who played Toshiro Takashi was not able to reprise his role in the sequel due to him playing the character Tomoko Nogata in the Police Academy series, which he contractually agreed to do before learning of the Nerds II sequel. Julia Montgomery who played Betty Childs was initially supposed to return, but after learning the movie would've begun with Betty cheating on Lewis with a random Alpha Beta in order to free up Lewis for a new love interest, Montgomery refused to return.

Initially the sequel was supposed to take place in Puerto Vallarta, Mexico, but the location was changed to Fort Lauderdale, Florida due to being a faster and cheaper alternative. Shooting took place at Fort Lauderdale and Miami, Florida during Spring break with many vacationing college students used as extras and background actors.

Curtis Armstrong admitted to hating the script and instead wanted to focus on his role in Moonlighting and turned down multiple offers from the studio with pay increases as well as the pleas of Robert Carradine who was worried that without the commitment of Anthony Edwards and now Curtis Armstrong the project would collapse. Armstrong eventually changed his mind when a Fox executive told him the script he was given wasn't final and that Larry Gelbart would be serving as a script doctor only to find out upon accepting the deal that Gelbart was not nor had he ever been approached for such a job.

== Reception ==
The film received mostly negative reviews from critics. It holds a 7% rating on Rotten Tomatoes based on 27 reviews with an average score of 3.67/10. The critical consensus reads: "It reunites most of the original cast and rounds them up for a trip to Fort Lauderdale for spring break, but Revenge of the Nerds II: Nerds in Paradise forgets to pack enough jokes or compelling characters to make it through its 89-minute running time." Audiences polled by CinemaScore gave the film an average grade of "C" on a scale of A+ to F.

Hal Hinson, writing in The Washington Post, derided the film's lowbrow style, and also called it "the closest thing to a comedy desert I've ever seen. I'm talking no laughs. Nada. (Okay, one laugh, when one of the nerds—Booger—shows up wearing a T-shirt with 'Who Farted?' on the front. But if that's the peak of your comedy pyramid, you're in big trouble.)"

Roger Ebert, for the Chicago Sun Times, gave the film 1.5 stars out of 4. He criticized the film's superficial understanding of what it means to be a nerd; the limited number of laughs despite "a couple of marginally funny moments in the movie [that] don’t go anywhere"; and particularly the unlikable characters, comparing the film to another comedy set in a college: "National Lampoon's Animal House succeeded in creating unforgettable characters. Nerds II just has a bunch of guys schlepping around wishing somebody had written some dialogue for them." Michael Wilmington of the Los Angeles Times commented that both of the Nerds films seemed to rely on having a built-in audience of people who were ostracized during adolescence in lieu of a good story or good jokes, but that where the original at least was "erratically funny", the sequel offered nothing but forced and unfunny gags. He also criticized the brutish means by which the "nerds" achieve victory, saying it makes it "hard to see much difference between their values and the ones of those tormenting them". David Sterritt similarly criticized the nerds' triumph in The Christian Science Monitor: "If these guys are so smart, why do they win their final victory with nothing more subtle than a punch in the mouth, backed up by a military tank?"

=== Box office ===
The film was a box office success, largely because many fans of the original saw it. Also, the movie had a relatively small budget of $10 million and its participants did not have large shares of the grosses.
