= St. Louis Blues (1939 film) =

1939 film directed by Raoul Walsh

- Film poster
- Directed by: Raoul Walsh
- Produced by: Jeff Lazarus
- Starring: Dorothy Lamour; Lloyd Nolan
- Cinematography: Theodor Sparkuhl
- Edited by: William Shea
- Music by: Score: Charles Bradshaw; Songs: Frank Loesser (music and lyrics); Burton Lane (music)
- Distributed by: Paramount Pictures
- Release date: February 3, 1939
- Running time: 92 minutes
- Country: United States
- Language: English

St. Louis Blues (retitled as Best of the Blues) is a 1939 American musical film directed by Raoul Walsh and set on a Mississippi River showboat. Though the song "St. Louis Blues" is performed, the film's plot is not based on the song. Artists appearing in the film include jazz singer Maxine Sullivan and composer/singer/actor Hoagy Carmichael. The film stars Dorothy Lamour, Lloyd Nolan, Tito Guízar, Jerome Cowan and Mary Parker.

Lamour sings "I Go for That" by Matt Malneck Jr. and Frank Loesser in the film, and it became a hit recording.

== Plot ==
A Broadway performer befriends a showboat skipper and they stage a musical revue. Competition from a carnival owner soon becomes a threat to their dreams.

== Cast ==
- Dorothy Lamour as Norma Malone
- Lloyd Nolan as Dave Geurney
- Tito Guízar as Rafael San Ramos
- Jerome Cowan as Ivan DeBrett
- Jessie Ralph as Aunt Tibbie
- William Frawley as Maj. Martingale
- Mary Parker as Punkins
- Maxine Sullivan as Ida
- Cliff Nazarro as Shorty
- Victor Kilian as Sheriff Burdick
- Walter Soderling as Mr. Hovey
- The King's Men as Themselves
- Virginia Howell as Mrs. Hovey
- Matty Malneck as Himself (Orchestra Leader)
- Emory Parnell as Policeman White

George Raft was offered the lead role, but he refused and was replaced by Nolan.
