= Hands over the City =

- Theatrical release poster
- Italian: Le mani sulla città
- Directed by: Francesco Rosi
- Written by: Francesco Rosi; Raffaele La Capria; Enzo Forcella
- Produced by: Lionello Santi
- Starring: Rod Steiger; Salvo Randone; Guido Alberti; Marcello Cannavale
- Cinematography: Gianni Di Venanzo
- Edited by: Mario Serandrei
- Music by: Piero Piccioni
- Distributed by: Warner Bros. Pictures
- Release dates: September 1963 (Italy); 17 September 1964 (U.S.)
- Running time: 105 minutes
- Country: Italy
- Languages: Italian; Neapolitan

Hands over the City (Italian: Le mani sulla città) is a 1963 Italian drama film co-written and directed by Francesco Rosi. It follows the real estate agent and politician Eduardo Nottola (Rod Steiger), who uses his power as a city councilman member to lobby for the displacement of the impoverished Naples population, and his personal fight against the idealist socialist politician De Vita (Carlo Fermariello).

The film had its world premiere at the main competition of the 24th Venice International Film Festival, where it won the Golden Lion, the festival's top prize.

In 2008, the film was included on the Italian Ministry of Cultural Heritage's 100 Italian films to be saved, a list of 100 films that "have changed the collective memory of the country between 1942 and 1978."

== Plot ==
A ruthless Neapolitan land developer and elected city councilman, Edoardo Nottola (Rod Steiger), manages to use political power to make personal profit in a large-scale suburban real-estate deal. However, after the collapse of a residential building next to a construction site, the manager of which is his son, the communist councilman De Vita (Carlo Fermariello) initiates an inquiry into Nottola's connection to the accident.

== Cast ==
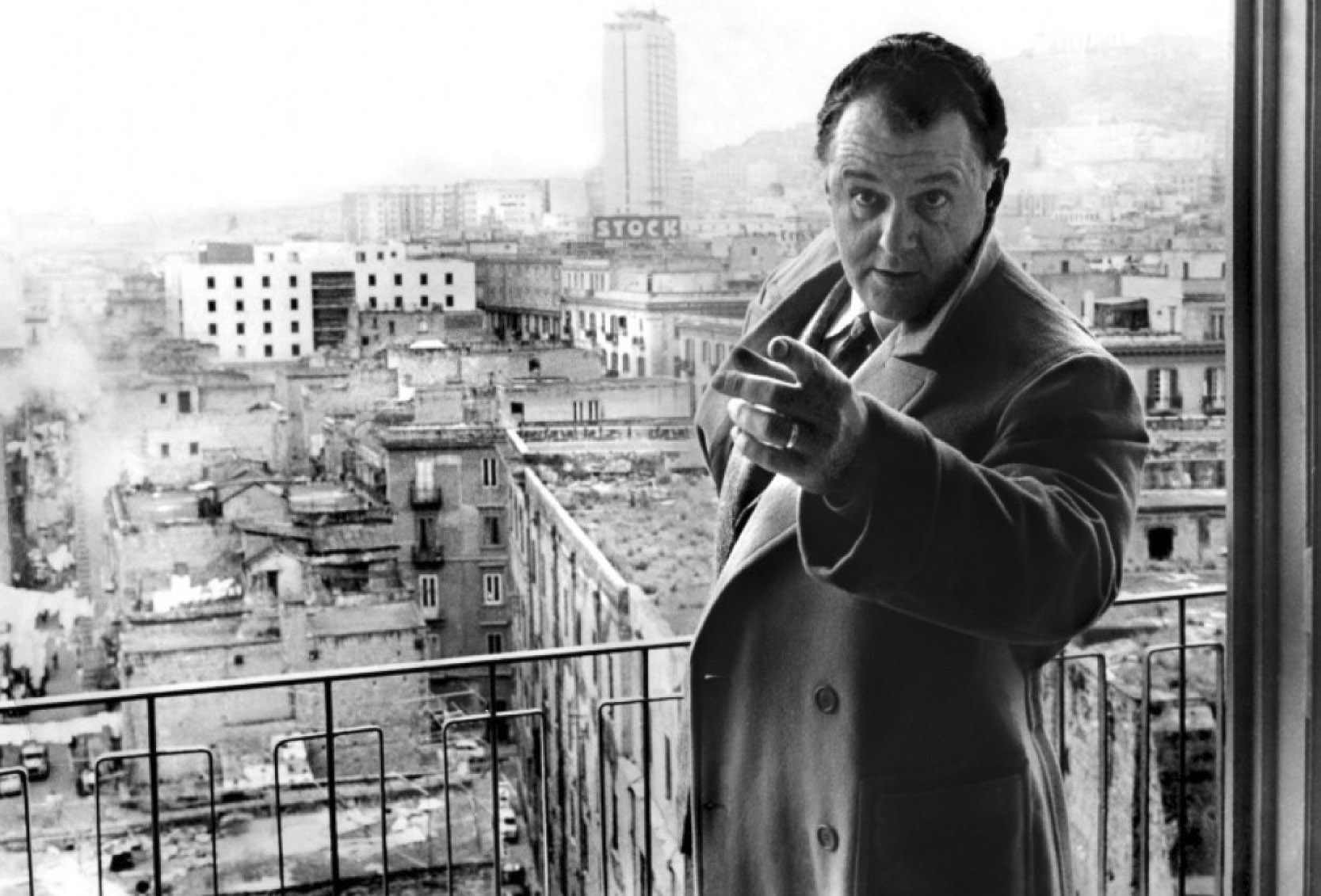
Rod Steiger in a stillframe from the movie

- Rod Steiger as entrepreneur Eduardo Nottola
- Salvo Randone as De Angeli
- Guido Alberti as Maglione
- Angelo D'Alessandro as Balsamo
- Carlo Fermariello as De Vita
- Marcello Cannavale as Nottola's friend
- Alberto Canocchia as Nottola's friend
- Gaetano Grimaldi Filioli as Nottola's friend
- Dante Di Pinto as the president at the commission of enquiry
- Dany Paris as Maglione's lover
- Alberto Amato as a counsellor
- Franco Rigamonti as a counsellor
- Terenzio Cordova as the inspector
- Vincenzo Metafora as the mayor

== Awards ==
The film won the Golden Lion award at the 1963 Venice Film Festival.
