= Enzo Forcella =

Italian writer, journalist and historian

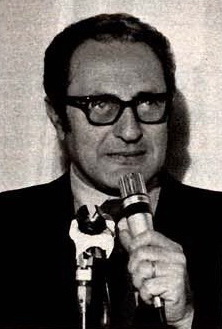
- Born: 15 May 1921; Rome, Italy
- Died: 9 February 1999 (aged 77); Rome, Italy
- Occupation: Writer

Enzo Forcella (15 May 1921 – 9 February 1999) was an Italian essayist, historian and journalist.

== Biography ==
Born in Rome, an orphan of war, Forcella graduated at the Vittorio Emanuele II National Boarding School in Rome benefiting from a free post provided for deserving students. During the World War II Forcella joined the Action Party and he started his career as a journalist in the newspaper Italia socialista. From 1950 to 1959 he was the Rome correspondent for the newspaper La Stampa, and later he collaborated with several publications, including the magazine Il Mondo and the newspapers Il Giorno and La Repubblica. Since its first experimental broadcasts until 1976, he was also a longtime collaborator of RAI, and he was director of Radio Tre between 1976 and 1985.

Also active as an essayist and a historian, in 1975 Forcella won the Bagutta Prize for his book Celebrazione di un trentennio. He also was scriptwriter of Francesco Rosi's award-winning film Hands over the City.

From 1985 to 1992, Forcella was a member of the municipal council of Rome, and between 1989 and 1992 he served as deputy mayor and councillor for transparency in the Carraro council.
