= Katharine Balfour =

American actress and writer (1921–1990)

- Born: February 7, 1921; New York City, U.S.
- Died: April 3, 1990 (aged 69); New York City, U.S.
- Occupations: Actress; writer
- Years active: 1942–1984

Katharine Balfour (February 7, 1921 – April 3, 1990) was an American actress and writer. Her best-known role was as the mother of Oliver, Ryan O'Neal's character, in the 1970 film Love Story, as well as Sophia Kebabian in America, America and was host of a radio talk show, Views in Brief, on WEVD in New York.

== Background ==
Katharine Balfour, daughter of Raphael and Gertrude Balber, was born in Manhattan and graduated from Morris High School in the South Bronx. She was married to New York Freudian psychoanalyst Leonard Sillman. From the mid-1960s until 1982, she had a close personal relationship with New York Times executive editor A.M. Rosenthal.

== Stage ==
In 1947 she created the role of Alma in director Margo Jones' original production of Tennessee Williams's Summer and Smoke in Jones' Theatre '47 in Dallas, performing it again in a later road production in 1949. Her Off Broadway roles included Helen of Troy in 1964's Helen, a performance that the New York Times review found "properly sinuous and sultry."

== Screen ==
Her first credited film role was as Elsa in the wartime MGM drama-musical Music for Millions (1944). In addition to her role as Oliver Barrett's mother in Love Story (1970), she appeared as Sophia Kebabian in America, America (1963), Amparo's mother in The Adventurers (1970), Mrs. Morrow in Bill (1981), and Theresa in Teachers (1984).

== Writings ==
She also contributed articles to Family Circle magazine. From 1968 to 1985, she interviewed celebrities as host of a radio talk show, Views in Brief, on WEVD in New York. In 1988 New York Magazine reported that she had written a two-hundred-page manuscript tentatively entitled "Bewitched, Bothered, and Bewildered," which was described as her "fictionalized memoirs."

== Death ==
She died on April 3, 1990, in New York City. According to her New York Times obituary, the cause of her death was amyotrophic lateral sclerosis, also called Lou Gehrig's disease.

== Filmography ==
Year	Title	Role	Notes
1944	Music for Millions	Elsa	
1963	America America	Sophia Kebabian	
1970	The Adventurers	Amparo's Mother	
1970	Love Story	Mrs. Barrett	
1981	Bill	Mrs. Morrow	TV movie
1984	Teachers	Theresa	(final film role)
