= A Sunday in September =

- Poster
- Directed by: Jörn Donner
- Written by: Jörn Donner
- Starring: Harriet Andersson, Thommy Berggren
- Cinematography: Tony Forsberg
- Edited by: Wic' Kjellin
- Music by: Bo Nilsson, Peter Jacques
- Release date: September 1, 1963
- Running time: 114 minutes
- Country: Sweden
- Language: Swedish

A Sunday in September (Swedish: En söndag i september) is a 1963 Swedish drama film directed by Jörn Donner. It is the first feature-length film directed by Donner.

The film follows a man named Stig (played by Thommy Berggren) and a woman named Birgitta (played by Harriet Andersson) through their short-lived marriage.

Harriet Andersson was widely praised by critics for her performance. The film was shown at the 24th Venice International Film Festival where it received the Opera Prima prize for best directoral debut.
