= Teacher, Teacher (38 Special song) =

1984 single by 38 Special

Single by 38 Special

from the album Teachers Original Soundtrack
- B-side: "Little Dreamer"
- Released: 1984
- Genre: Southern rock, rock
- Length: 3:58
- Label: Capitol
- Songwriter(s): Jim Vallance; Bryan Adams
- Producer(s): Rodney Mills; 38 Special

38 Special singles chronology
"One Time for Old Times" (1984)	"Teacher, Teacher" (1984)	"Like No Other Night" (1986)

"Teacher, Teacher" is a single by 38 Special from the soundtrack to the film Teachers. It reached number 25 on the Billboard Hot 100 in November 1984. Don Barnes sang lead vocals on the song.

== Charts ==
Chart (1984–1985)	Peak position
US Billboard Hot 100	25
US Top Rock Tracks (Billboard)	4
Canada Top 100 Singles (RPM)	26
