= The Terrorist (1963 film) =

1963 Italian film by Gianfranco De Bosio

- Directed by: Gianfranco De Bosio
- Starring: Gian Maria Volonté; Philippe Leroy; Giulio Bosetti; Raffaella Carrà; José Quaglio; Cesare Miceli Picardi; Tino Carraro; Anouk Aimée
- Cinematography: Alfio Contini; Lamberto Caimi
- Music by: Piero Piccioni
- Release date: 1963
- Country: Italy
- Language: Italian

Il terrorista, internationally released as The Terrorist, is a 1963 Italian war drama film directed by Gianfranco De Bosio. It is inspired to real life events of the Italian partisan Otello Pighin. The film entered the 24th Venice International Film Festival, in which it won the Pasinetti Award.

== Synopsis ==
In the winter of 1943, a group of resistance fighters, led by the "engineer" and including Rodolfo, Oscar and Danilo, manage to detonate a charge at the Kommandantur in Venice. The operation was relatively successful: a Venetian prostitute lost her life, while the commandant escaped. The Germans arrested forty hostages.

The representatives of the five clandestine opposition parties within the Liberation Committee, who represent the Resistance in Venice, meet in secret, but are very divided on the course of action to be taken and the clandestine action underway. Faced with the Germans' threat to shoot the hostages, the Committee decided to call on the Archbishop to intervene and put a temporary halt to the attacks carried out by the "engineer". However, that very evening, a loudspeaker used for Fascist propaganda blows up.

The doctor, Ugo, in charge of warning the "engineer", hesitated, consulted a resistant vicar among his friends and, in the end, let the group carry on.

The next day, an attack on La Gazette, a fascist newspaper, fails: "the engineer" and Oscar are pursued and Oscar kills one of his pursuers, but they still manage to escape. Twenty hostages are shot, although it remains unclear whether these reprisals are directly linked to the current attacks.

Count Penna, representing the Liberals on the clandestine committee, was arrested and replaced by the elderly Pucci. The Committee's secret meeting is even more stormy than the previous one, especially as each of the participants is under the threat of imminent arrest. In fact, during the night, Pucci and the socialist representative "Quadro" were arrested. The other three committee members, Christian Democrat "Nemo", Action Party representative "Smith" and Communist "Piero", are hidden by Ugo in his clinic. Oscar is arrested in his turn, and as he is taken away on a boat, his interrogator tells him that he knows the exact identity of the "engineer" perfectly well: he is an assistant professor of physics at Padua University by the name of Renato Braschi.

Finally warned, the "engineer", who has been able to meet his wife Anna for an hour, decides with Ugo to organize their escape together. Before doing so, he shoots an SS torturer dead with a rifle, causing the Fascists to massacre six hostages, including Oscar. The next day, the operation to escape from Venice to the mainland is launched, but fails because the Germans and Fascists knew about it: Renato was shot and the three political leaders hiding in the clinic were captured. Only Ugo, arriving by motorboat and witnessing the shooting, is able to escape aboard the boat.

== Cast ==
- Gian Maria Volonté: Renato Braschi
- Philippe Leroy: Rodolfo Boscovich
- Tino Carraro: De Ceva "Smith"
- Anouk Aimée: Anna Braschi
- Giulio Bosetti: Ugo Ongaro
- Raffaella Carrà: Giuliana
- José Quaglio: Piero
- Carlo Bagno: Oscar Varino
- Franco Graziosi: Aldrighi "Quadro"
