= Gregory Rozakis =

American actor (1917–2012)

- Born: January 30, 1943; Brooklyn, New York, U.S.
- Died: August 24, 1989 (aged 46); Brooklyn, New York, U.S.
- Education: Erasmus Hall High School; New York University
- Occupations: Actor, playwright
- Years active: 1961–1988

Gregory Rozakis (January 30, 1943 – August 24, 1989) was an American character actor and playwright, perhaps best remembered as Kim Stanley's son in William Inge's play, Natural Affection, the Christ-like Armenian immigrant in Elia Kazan's America America, and as Charlie Chaplin in Francis Ford Coppola's The Cotton Club.

== Early life and career ==
Born January 30, 1943 in Park Slope, Brooklyn, Rozakis was the eldest of two children born to waiter and later restaurant manager Stavros Rozakis and Stella Tsambarlis. He attended Erasmus Hall High School, New York University, and studied with Lee Strasberg.

In November 1962, Rozakis's teleplay, Chalk Marks on a Brick Wall (adapted from his like-named stage play, in which he had appeared, Off-Broadway, the previous year), served as his small screen writing/acting debut on the CBS series Lamp Unto My Feet.

In 1963, he made his Broadway debut in William Inge's Natural Affection, alongside Kim Stanley, Harry Guardino, and Tom Bosley. Although the play received mixed reviews and closed after just 30 performances, the critics were considerably more impressed, none more so than Martin Gottfried, who said the play was "blessed with a quartet of magnificent performances", then briefly summarized the contributions of Rozakis's three co-stars before addressing what he judged the production's most memorable asset.

But it is Gregory Rozakis, making his Broadway debut, whom you will never forget. His aching misery as that boy is staggering and at the play's end he becomes a monumentally tragic figure, almost soaring off the stage and into mid-air in a violence of revenge.

In an interview published later that year in the magazine, Teen Hit Parader, Rozakis confessed that, as much as he enjoyed his current success, in the long run, he viewed acting as merely the means to an end.

In fact, I'd like to achieve the security of a successful actor, then devote myself exclusively to writing. But right now, I'm more valuable to myself as an actor than as a playwright. I'm selling my youth on the stage and screen. This country has a fetish for youth – People can't seem to get enough of it. It's almost pathetic. I'm not so good-looking, but I am young — and I'm not such a bad actor.

In 1970, Rozakis's modern adaptation of Euripides' Orestes, starring Rozakis and, with music by Mark Shangold and lyrics by Andrew Amic-Angelo, debuted in 1970, and was revived in February 1973

In his penultimate feature film, The Cotton Club, Rozakis finally had the opportunity to realize one of his longstanding ambitions, that of portraying one of his earliest role models as a multi-hyphenate, Charlie Chaplin, one of those, who, as he put it (also citing Orson Welles), "did everything".

Rozakis's final film, John Patrick Shanley's Five Corners, featured Rozakis as one of a pair of neighborhood cops not quite up to the task of rescuing Jodie Foster's character from the neighborhood bad egg, Heinz (John Turturro). His portrayal—along Turturro's and that of Rose Gregorio as Heinz's mother—was dubbed one of the film's "especially great performances" by Cleveland Plain Dealer entertainment editor, Joanna Connors.

A few months after Five Corners' release, Rozakis's name appeared in the New York Daily News, as a private citizen and Brooklyn resident, offering his emphatic thumbs up—and unabashed "love letter"–to recently crowned Oscar-winner, Moonstruck's Cher Bono.

[As] an actor with many years' experience, I've always maintained that an Academy Award should be given those actors and actresses not only who give a superbrilliant performance in film, but whose characterization and performance somehow make us feel like a zillion dollars and grateful we were born. As brilliant as Meryl Streep, Glenn Close, Holly Hunter, and poor, dear Sally Kirkland were in their respective movies, it was only Cher who made me feel like a zillion and happy that I was born. Cher, this is my love letter to you! -Greg Rozakis, Brooklyn

== Personal life and death ==
On August 24, 1989, Rozakis died of complications from HIV at Brooklyn's New York Methodist Hospital, survived by his mother Stella, and by a sister, Marcella. His remains are interred at Green-wood Cemetery.

== Selected filmography ==
- Lamp Unto My Feet
  - Ep. "Chalk Marks on a Brick Wall" (1962) as
- The Defenders
  - Ep. "The Naked Heiress" (1962) as Club Patron (uncredited)
  - Ep. "Loophole" (1963) as Megland
- The DuPont Show of the Week
  - Ep. "Ride with Terror" (1963) as Artie Connors
- America America (1963) as Hohannes Gardashian
- The Danny Thomas Hour
  - Ep. "Two for Penny" (1968) as Yani
- The Best of Everything
  - Eps. 1.112 thru 1.114 (1970) as Squirrel
- Death Wish (1974) as Spraycan
- The Gambler (1974) as Joe
- Starsky & Hutch
  - Ep. "Pariah" (1975) as Joseph Tramaine
  - Ep. "Death in a Different Place" (1977) as Nick Hunter
- The Wide World of Mystery
  - Ep. "Too Easy to Kill" (1975) as Tony
- Cannon
  - Ep. "A Touch of Venom" (1975) as Warren Michaelson
- Abduction (1975) as Frank Lawson
- Baretta
  - Ep. "Murder for Me" (1976) as Nica Petros
- Police Story
  - Ep. "Two Frogs on a Mongoose" (1976) as Jessie
- Kojak
  - Eps. "Kojac's Days", Pts. 1 & 2 (1977) as Frankie the Mouth
- Charlie's Angels
  - Ep. "Disco Angels" (1979) as Mario Montero
- Kaz
  - Ep. "Count Your Fingers" (1979)
- Eischied
  - Ep. "Do They Really Have to Die?" (1979) as Mongo
- Lou Grant
  - Ep. "Inheritance" (1980) as Jamal Azar
- The Last Married Couple in America (1980) as Party Guest
- Hart to Hart
  - Ep. Death Set (1980) as Simon
- Below the Belt (1980) as Peddler
- The Million Dollar Face (1981)
- The Cotton Club (1984) as Charlie Chaplin
- Five Corners (1987) as Mazola
- As the World Turns
- Ep. "Lisa Learns a Shattering Truth" (1987) as Dr. Niarchos
