= Arturo Lanocita =

Italian writer, journalist and film critic

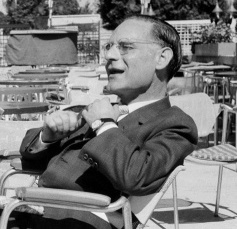
- Lanocita in 1953
- Born: 4 June 1904; Limbadi, Italy
- Died: 23 April 1983 (aged 78); Milan, Italy
- Occupations: Writer, journalist, film critic

Arturo Lanocita (4 June 1904 – 23 April 1983) was an Italian writer, journalist and film critic. He was member of the international film jury at the IX Mostra Internazionale d'Arte Cinematografica in Venice in 1948.
