= Mickey Marcus =

American-Israeli military general (1901-1948)

- Born: David Daniel Marcus; February 22, 1901; Manhattan, New York, US
- Died: June 10, 1948 (aged 47); Abu Ghosh, Israel
- Burial place: West Point Cemetery; West Point, New York
- Military career
- Allegiance: United States of America; Israel
- Branch: United States Army; Haganah; Israel Defense Forces
- Service years: 1924–1948
- Rank: Colonel (USA); Aluf (IDF)
- Nickname: "Mickey"
- Conflicts: World War II: Operation Overlord; Normandy Landings; Battle of Berlin; 1948 Arab–Israeli War: Siege of Jerusalem (1948); Battle of Latrun (1948); Operation Bin Nun Bet; Operation Yoram †
- Awards: Army Distinguished Service Medal; Bronze Star Medal; Commander of the Order of the British Empire (CBE)

David Daniel "Mickey" Marcus (February 22, 1901 – June 10, 1948) was a United States Army colonel, later Israel's first general, who was a principal architect of the U.S. military's World War II civil-affairs policies, including the organization of the war-crimes trials in Germany and in Japan.

He assisted Israel during the 1948 Arab–Israeli War, one of the well-known Israeli Machal soldiers, becoming Israel's first modern general (Hebrew: Aluf), a title awarded to him posthumously. He was killed by friendly fire. He was portrayed by Kirk Douglas in the 1966 Hollywood movie Cast a Giant Shadow, which focused on his role in the war.

== Early life ==
Marcus's Jewish parents, Mordechai Marcus and Leah Marcus (née Goldstein), came from Iași, Romania. Born on Hester Street on Manhattan's Lower East Side, Marcus was bright and athletic. He attended Boys' High School in Brooklyn, and was then accepted at West Point in 1920 and graduated with the class of 1924. After completing his active duty requirement, he attended Brooklyn Law School. He spent most of the 1930s as an assistant United States attorney in New York, prosecuting gangsters such as Lucky Luciano. In 1940, Mayor Fiorello La Guardia named Marcus commissioner of the New York City Department of Correction for the City of New York.

== World War II ==
After leaving active duty, Marcus had continued his army service in the Organized Reserve Corps. In 1939, he joined the Judge Advocate General's Corps, and became judge advocate of his Army National Guard unit, the 27th Infantry Division, which was federalized in 1940. Though as a legal officer, he was not supposed to command troops, he wangled a unit command during the 1941 Louisiana Maneuvers.

After the Japanese attack on Pearl Harbor, the 27th Division deployed to Hawaii. There, Marcus organized and commanded a Ranger Combat Training School, to provide troop training in methods of unarmed defense to combat Japanese infiltration tactics. Instead of a field command, though, Marcus was sent to Washington in 1943. He was assigned to the Civil Affairs Division, as chief of planning for occupation governments in territories liberated from the Axis. He accompanied U.S. delegations to the conferences at Cairo, Teheran, Yalta, and Potsdam, and helped draft the 1943 surrender terms for Italy.

In May 1944, Marcus got himself sent to the United Kingdom on Civil Affairs business. He then traded on being a West Point classmate of General Maxwell D. Taylor to parachute into Normandy on D-Day with the first wave of Taylor's 101st Airborne Division, despite having no paratrooper training. He took informal command of some of the scattered paratroopers, and was in combat for a week. He was then sent back to the United States.

After V-E Day in 1945, General Lucius D. Clay asked for Marcus to serve on his staff in the occupation of Germany. Marcus was in charge of providing for the millions of displaced persons in Germany. Clay required all his subordinates to tour the Dachau concentration camp. Shocked by what he saw, the previously non-Zionist Marcus began to think differently about a Jewish state.

In 1946, he was named chief of the Army's War Crimes Division in Washington, DC, planning legal and security procedures for the Nuremberg trials and the Tokyo War Crimes Tribunal. He attended the Nuremberg trials, making sure that Nazi crimes were thoroughly documented. After the trials, he was offered promotion to brigadier general, but instead elected to return to civilian life and his law practice.

In recognition of his service in "negotiation and drafting of the Italian Surrender Instrument, the Instrument of Unconditional Surrender of Germany, and the international machinery to be used for the control of Germany after her total defeat", he was awarded the Distinguished Service Medal. In 1946, he was named an honorary Commander of the Order of the British Empire, "in recognition of the distinguished service performed … in cooperation with British armed forces during the war." He also was awarded the Bronze Star and other awards.

== Israeli military career ==
US Col. Mickey Marcus in 1948, the first modern Israeli general (Aluf)

In 1947, David Ben-Gurion asked Marcus to recruit a U.S. officer to serve as military advisor to the nascent Israeli army, the Haganah. However, all 24 officers whom Shlomo Shamir and he tried to recruit rejected the offer. So, Marcus volunteered himself.

Under the nom de guerre "Michael Stone", he arrived in Palestine in January 1948. Arab armies surrounded the soon-to-be declared State of Israel.

He designed a command-and-control structure for the Haganah, adapting his U.S. Army experience to its special needs. He identified Israel's weakest points in the Negev south, and the Jerusalem area.

Marcus was appointed to the equivalent of Aluf ("general") and given command of the Jerusalem front on May 28, 1948. However, as a former officer in the US Army, he was not permitted to accept any official titles in a foreign army, so this title was granted to him only 14 months after his death. As no ranks had been granted to the Israeli high command at that time, he became the first general in the fledgling nation's army (see Israel Defense Forces). (Aluf was then equivalent to brigadier general, but since 1967, Aluf has been equivalent to major general.)

He participated in planning Operations Bin Nun Bet and Yoram against the Latrun fort, held by the Arab Legion, which blocked the road from Tel Aviv to Jerusalem, which was under siege. Both attacks failed, but Marcus then built the "Burma Road to Jerusalem" – a makeshift winding road through difficult hill terrain, nicknamed after the World War II supply route to China. His "Burma Road" was opened to vehicles on June 10, breaking the siege of Jerusalem, a day before a United Nations ceasefire took effect.

== Death ==
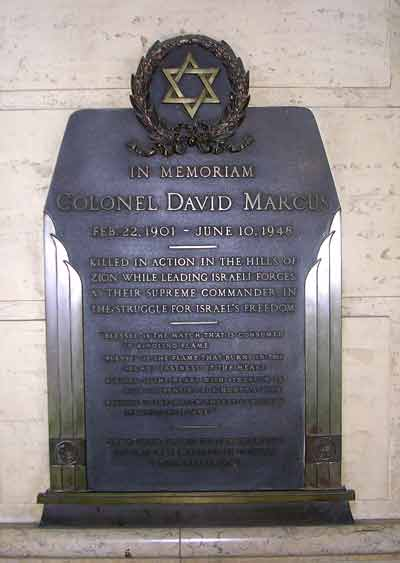
Memorial plaque for Colonel David Marcus at Union Temple of Brooklyn

A few hours before the ceasefire, Marcus returned to his Central Front headquarters. He and his commanders were billeted in the monks' quarters of the abandoned Monastere Notre Dame de la Nouvelle Alliance in Abu Ghosh. Shortly before 4:00 am, 18-year-old Eliezer Linski, a one-year Palmach veteran, challenged Marcus, whom he saw as a figure in white.

When Marcus failed to respond with the password, Linski fired in the air and the man ran towards the monastery. He fired at the man, as did one or more fighters in a nearby sentry post. Marcus was found dead, wrapped in a white blanket. Marcus knew very little Hebrew and had responded in English, which Linski did not understand. Marcus wore no rank, although officers had been recognized by a ribbon pinned to their uniforms. As Marcus' body was removed from Abu Ghosh, a ribbon was found and placed on his casket. Harry Levin wrote, "[d]iscovering whom he had killed, the soldier tried to shoot himself, but was disarmed".

His body was returned to the United States for burial at West Point, accompanied by Moshe Dayan and his wife Ruth, Yoseph Harel, and the wife of his aide de camp, Alex Broida. His burial, with military honors, was attended by Governor of New York Thomas Dewey, former Secretary of the Treasury Henry Morgenthau, and General Maxwell Taylor, then superintendent of the United States Military Academy at West Point.

Ben-Gurion was suspicious of the initial report that Marcus had been shot accidentally. The Haganah was composed of several factions whose lack of consensus over strategy and tactics was one of the reasons for Marcus' appointment as commander for Jerusalem, and Ben-Gurion suspected that elements in the Palmach may have conspired to kill Marcus so he would be replaced. On the same day Marcus was shot, Ben-Gurion summoned Yaakov Shimshon Shapira—later Israel's attorney general—and asked him to investigate the incident. Shapira's investigation was cursory. Despite conflicting reports concerning the number of shots fired, how many wounds Marcus suffered, whether the fatal wound could have been caused by Linski's rifle, and how and why Marcus may have been outside the monastery, he concluded that Linski shot Marcus in the line of duty. The report has never been made public.

== Legacy ==
Although Marcus' grave is the only one in the West Point Cemetery at the United States Military Academy for an American killed fighting under the flag of another country; he was still eligible for interment there because he was a graduate of the academy who served honorably. His paratrooper helmet and Walther Model 9 pistol are displayed at the West Point Museum. His gravestone at West Point reads:

"Colonel David Marcus—a Soldier for All Humanity".

A memorial plaque in his honor is located in the lobby of the Union Temple of Brooklyn where his funeral service was conducted. It reads:

"Killed in action in the hills of Zion while leading Israeli forces as their supreme commander in the struggle for Israel's freedom—Blessed is the match that is consumed in kindling flame/ Blessed is the flame that burns in the secret fastness of the heart/ Blessed is the heart with strength to stop its beating for honor's sake/ Blessed is the match that is consumed in kindling flame—Dedicated by his fellow members of Union Temple of Brooklyn December 9, 1949."

Ben-Gurion wrote to Marcus' wife Emma in Brooklyn: "Marcus was the best man we had". On May 10, 1951, Ben-Gurion laid a wreath at Marcus' grave, accompanied by Emma Marcus. In January 2015, Israel's president, Reuven Rivlin, visited the United States Military Academy at West Point and spoke at Marcus' grave:

"For me, he was the first general of the IDF in every sense of the word. He had a sense of purpose and mission, in the establishment of the Israel Defense Forces, he taught us how to act as an army in our early days, and was one of Ben-Gurion’s greatest military advisors. There is no one who better illustrates the strong bond between Israel and the United States."

Kibbutz Mishmar David and the neighborhood of Neve David in Tel Aviv, as well as numerous streets, are named after him. In New York City, the Colonel David Marcus Memorial Playground (in Brooklyn, on the north side of Avenue P between East 4th Street and Ocean Parkway) is also named for him, as was the David Marcus movie theater on Jerome Avenue in the Norwood section of the Bronx. 40.60970°N 73.96959°W

According to Yael Driver, daughter of Maj.-Gen. Shlomo Shamir, prior to Marcus's arrival, the Haganah soldiers were "courageous, loyal, and ready to sacrifice their lives," but they did not understand rank or structure of the army. Marcus's lasing contribution was to adapt US Army manuals on military training.

== Awards ==

Army Distinguished Service Medal
Bronze Star Medal	American Defense Service Medal	American Campaign Medal
Asiatic–Pacific Campaign Medal	European–African–Middle Eastern Campaign Medal with bronze campaign star	World War II Victory Medal
Army of Occupation Medal with 'Germany' clasp	Commander of the Order of the British Empire (CBE)	War of Independence Ribbon (Israel)

== See also ==
- History of Israel
- The Hope
- Cast a Giant Shadow
