= Stathis Giallelis =

Greek actor (born 1941)

- Born: January 21, 1941 (age 85); Kalamata, Greece
- Years active: 1963–1983

Stathis Giallelis (Greek: Στάθης Γιαλελής; born January 21, 1941) is a retired Greek actor. He won brief international renown in the early 1960s as the star of Elia Kazan's Academy Award-nominated epic America America, a role which brought him the Golden Globe Award for New Star of the Year – Actor, as well as a nomination for Golden Globe Award for Best Actor – Motion Picture Drama.

== America America ==
Giallelis' entire prominence revolves around his central role in America America. He appears in nearly every scene of the 174-minute film and gives what some critics described at the time as a "towering performance". He has not, however, faced a camera since 1980 and his biographical details remain sketchy. The date of his birth is generally accepted as correct, although two sources indicate 1939 as the year. All listings agree that he was born in Greece, but none specify the location. The medium-height, slightly built Giallelis was twenty-one years old in mid-1962, upon Elia Kazan's arrival in Greece looking for someone who could capture his uncle's life in 1890s Anatolia and the struggle to achieve his determined dream of immigrating to the United States. Kazan wanted an unknown actor in whom the audience would see the character rather than the familiar face. In his autobiography, Elia Kazan: A Life, the director describes the details of his search for "a ferret, not a lion", someone who, like his uncle, did not always behave honorably, but had "my boy's single redeeming quality, devotion to his father and family".

Kazan first tried to find his leading actor in England and, subsequently, in France, where a likely candidate was found, tested and rejected as "too handsome" and "lacking desperation". Even the Actors Studio proved deficient in providing the ideal aspirant. Finally, as he described it, "I did the obvious, went to Athens, and in the office a film director found an apprentice sweeping the floor so he could be near production work". This was the office of Greek producer/director Daniel Bourla. Unfortunately, Giallelis was severely limited in both acting experience and knowledge of English. The only son in a family with four daughters, he nevertheless impressed Kazan with his sincerity and deeply felt reminiscences of his Communist father's death in the aftermath of the Communist–centrist/rightist struggle in the Greek Civil War. Kazan later compared Giallelis' performance to that of the protagonist in Vittorio De Sica's 1949 neorealist classic Bicycle Thieves.

== Short-lived fame ==
Giallelis worked on his English for nearly 18 months while preparing for and filming his role. He received positive critical notices. The New York Times' Bosley Crowther, in his December 16, 1963 review of the film, noted that "Greek lad Stathis Giallelis (pronounced STAH-this-Ya-lah-LEASE) is incredibly good as the determined hero, putting fire and spirit into the role". Other critics called his performance "mesmerizing", "heartbreaking" and "unforgettable".

America America earned three Oscar nominations for Elia Kazan (Best Picture, Best Director and Best Original Screenplay), but its only win on Oscar night, April 13, 1964, was for Gene Callahan's black-and-white Art Direction. Eleven additional nominations came from other awards, including Golden Globes, which, a month earlier, March 11, named Elia Kazan "Best Director" and Giallelis "Most Promising Male Newcomer/New Star of the Year", an award he shared with two of the remaining five nominees—Albert Finney and Robert Walker, Jr. He was also nominated for "Best Actor in a Drama", but lost to Sidney Poitier in his Oscar-winning Lilies of the Field role.

== Later roles in the 1960s ==
As America America received wide distribution in Europe and elsewhere in 1964–65, Giallelis basked in the spotlight. In the months between the end of production and its December release, he completed a cameo role in Nikos Koundouros' 1963 Greek art film Mikres Afrodites (Young Aphrodites). Returning to Hollywood, the young actor seemed to be on the verge of a long and successful film career. Ultimately, however, in the 16-year period between 1964 and 1980, he appeared in front of the camera only seven more times in widely spaced film projects, only three of which (Cast a Giant Shadow, Blue and The Children of Sanchez) were American productions.

Giallelis' first post-America America film offer came shortly after the epic went into wide release during Christmas week of 1963. Leopoldo Torre Nilsson, Argentina's internationally best known filmmaker, whose hypocrisy- and corruption-themed films regularly received acclaim at European film festivals, invited him to star in his new project, El Ojo de la Cerradura (The Eavesdropper). His co-star, and the only other non-Spanish speaker in the cast would be intense twenty-one-year-old actress Janet Margolin who, two years earlier, received critical praise for her highly dramatic co-starring role (with Keir Dullea) in Frank Perry's David and Lisa. Filmed in Buenos Aires, El Ojo de la Cerradura garnered encouraging notices at a number of film festivals and won the Silver Condor Best Film Award from the Argentine Film Critics Association. Two years later it received a belated release in U.S. art houses, including a September 1966 New York premiere. Despite good notices, it soon ended its run and has remained elusive. Giallelis' second 1966 U.S. release, Cast a Giant Shadow, is the only title in his brief filmography structured as a major studio production. The all-star epic about a Jewish-American army officer's key leadership role in winning the battles which led to the 1948 establishment of Israel, found him fifth-billed after Kirk Douglas (as the central figure, Colonel Mickey Marcus), Senta Berger, Angie Dickinson and James Donald. His role, as a dedicated Israeli fighter for independence, spotted him in various brief moments throughout the film, but did not leave a strong impression. Despite its Hollywood pedigree, Cast a Giant Shadow was shot by director Melville Shavelson entirely on outdoor locations in Israel and Italy as well as studio interiors at Rome's Cinecittà studios.

Two more years would pass before Giallelis was seen in another film. Blue was a well-budgeted independent western directed on picturesque Utah locations by Silvio Narizzano. Billed fourth after Terence Stamp (as "Azul" ["Blue" in Spanish]), Joanna Pettet and Karl Malden, Giallelis, as the son of Mexican bandit Ricardo Montalbán had little to show for his dramatic efforts and, with Montalban's "Special guest" billing factored in, he actually was, again, in fifth place. Released by Paramount on May 10, 1968, Blue was perceived by a number of critics as an anti-war allegory, specifically focusing on Vietnam. Saddled with a mostly negative response from the critics, the film was quickly out of theaters.

== Last years of activity as an actor ==
Some sources credit Giallelis with a role in the Yugoslav-produced war film Rekvijem (Requiem), but his participation remains unconfirmed. The World War II heroics on display gave top billing to American Ty Hardin who, in the late 1960s and early 1970s, appeared in a number of European-made action films and Spaghetti Westerns. Rekvijem premiered in Yugoslavia on July 15, 1970, and, although it never had a U.S. release, it was later seen on television in a cut and dubbed version entitled Last Rampage.

In 1974, Jules Dassin and his wife Melina Mercouri used the donated services of many top entertainment personalities to produce The Rehearsal, an angry docudrama which reconstructed the events leading to the killing of some forty students in Athens, as they protested against the heavy-handed rule of the Greek Junta. As a Greek living abroad, Giallelis was invited to participate along with Olympia Dukakis, Mikis Theodorakis and other celebrities of varying nationalities, such as Laurence Olivier and Maximilian Schell. Socially active writers, including Lillian Hellman and former Elia Kazan compatriot Arthur Miller also took rare acting turns in the production. Filmed in a makeshift New York studio, the film was finished only days before the Junta's fall in July, and was thus set aside without public showings. Decades later, it received a brief New York premiere on October 17, 2001. Now able to return to his homeland, Giallelis appeared in esteemed Greek director Pantelis Voulgaris' Nineteen Eighty-Four-like allegory Happy Day, playing one of the leads in the story about imprisonment and repression in an unspecified European-style society. Having briefly been a Hollywood star in the previous decade, he was still seen as a celebrity in his homeland, but the film, despite receiving top prizes at Greek film festivals in 1976 and a showing in Canada at the 1977 Toronto Festival of Festivals, had little impact on his career.

After a passage of another two years, Giallelis appeared in his last-to-date American film, The Children of Sanchez. Hall Bartlett's adaptation of the Oscar Lewis novel was filmed on location in Mexico and starred native-born Anthony Quinn as his country's putative everyman, Jesus Sanchez. Giallelis received yet another fifth billing, following two veteran Mexican actresses, Dolores del Río and Katy Jurado, as well as Venezuelan Lupita Ferrer who, at the time, was married to Hall Bartlett. Gialellis's role as Roberto was relatively small and underwritten, but he did receive a couple of closeups, which showed premature aging on the 37-year-old actor's once-youthful face. Upon its Los Angeles premiere on November 22, 1978, the film received mixed to poor reviews, with the primary attention going to Chuck Mangione's lively score.

Two additional years elapsed before Giallelis made one more passage in front of the cameras. In writer-director Giuseppe Ferrara's 1980 RAI TV Italian miniseries, Panagulis vive (Panagoulis Lives), which examined the life and death of Greece's renowned martyred poet-politician/democracy activist Alexandros Panagoulis (1939–1976), the title role went to the actor whose ethnicity, still-remaining international fame, and age (a year-and-a-half younger than Panagoulis) made him a natural candidate for the part. Heading a large cast, he received generally favorable notices in various European media outlets. The 220-minute production, however, was never made available to American audiences.

== Career evaluation ==
In his autobiography, Elia Kazan faults Giallelis for having been pampered by his mother and four sisters and never developing enough ambition to become a viable screen personality. He writes that the young actor should have devoted more time to losing his accent so he would not be cast exclusively in ethnic roles and his speech pattern could be better understood by American audiences. However, Kazan's biographer, film critic and historian Richard Schickel disagrees, stating that Giallelis' speaking mannerisms in America America are clear and distinct. Whatever the reasons for the actor's aborted film career, as one of a handful of screen performers known for a single acclaimed role (an ultimate example would be Maria Falconetti), his tour de force in America America provides him with a secure place in film history.

== Later life ==
After his years as an award-winning actor, Giallelis exited the life of Hollywood glam and went to work at the United Nations International School in Manhattan, New York, working as a child supervisor and mentor. He retired in the summer of 2008.
