= Paul Mann =

Canadian actor and drama instructor (1913–1985)

- Born: December 2, 1913; Toronto, Ontario, Canada
- Died: September 24, 1985 (aged 71); Bronxville, New York, U.S.
- Education: Neighborhood Playhouse; Group Theatre
- Occupations: Actor, drama instructor
- Years active: 1929–1971
- Relatives: Larry D. Mann (brother) (1922–2014); Danny Mann (nephew; born 1951)

Paul Mann (December 2, 1913 – September 24, 1985) was a Canadian film and theatre actor, as well as drama instructor founder who founded the Paul Mann Actor's Workshop. He is the brother of actor and broadcaster Larry D. Mann (1922–2014) and uncle of voice actor Danny Mann (born 1951).

== Biography ==
Born in Toronto, Ontario, Mann studied acting and theatrical production through practical training with prominent New York ensembles, including the Neighborhood Playhouse, the Group Theatre, and the Playwrights Company. He was instrumental in the development of method acting, teaching at both the Actors' Studio and the Actors' Workshop. He later served as a Master Teacher of Acting and Chair of the Department of Acting at New York University's School of the Arts from 1967 to 1971. Mann was influential in developing the concept of Method acting in America. While many other Method advocates (including Lee Strasberg) shared their knowledge at the Actors Studio, Mann taught his own classes at his Actor's Workshop, founded in 1953. Along with Lloyd Richards (a fellow Toronto native and chief assistant director of the school), Mann also managed to create a comfortable atmosphere for actors of all races. Alumni of his school include Ruby Dee, Billy Dee Williams, Ossie Davis, Sidney Poitier, Al Lewis, and Vic Morrow.

Mann's own acting career was based primarily in theatre, beginning when he was sixteen. His onscreen appearances were limited to an episode of the 1950s television serial Danger and two feature film roles. The first was that of merchant Aleko Sinnikoglou in America, America (1963) (directed by his friend Elia Kazan) and the last was the village butcher Lazar Wolf in the screen adaptation of Fiddler on the Roof (1971). He was nominated for the Golden Globe Award for Best Supporting Actor – Motion Picture for both films.

Mann also was professor of acting and director of the theater arts program at the [University of Wisconsin-Green Bay]. A year before his death, Mann was found liable in a civil suit brought in Manhattan by eight female former students accusing him of sexual abuse and harassment and was ordered to pay them a total of $12,000.

== Death ==
Mann died of a stroke on September 24, 1985, at the age of 71 in Bronxville, New York.

== Filmography ==
Year	Title	Role	Notes
1963	America, America	Aleko Sinnikoglou	
1971	Fiddler on the Roof	Lazar Wolf	(final film role)

== Theatre credits ==
In most recent order:

- Danton's Death / [Revival, Play] / ? / Oct 21, 1965 - Nov 1965
- Incident at Vichy / [Original, Play, Drama] / Marchand / Dec 3, 1964 - May 7, 1965
- The Changeling / [Original, Play] / ? / Oct 29, 1964 - Dec 23, 1964
- After The Fall / [Original, Play, Drama] / Quentin's Father; Jason Robards portrayed Quentin / Jan 23, 1964 - May 29, 1965
- Too Late the Phalarope / [Original, Play] / Japie Grobler / Oct 11, 1956 - Nov 10, 1956
- Flight Into Egypt / [Original, Play, Drama] / Freund / Mar 18, 1952 - Apr 19, 1952
- Macbeth / [Revival, Play, Tragedy] / Menteith and Murderer / Mar 31, 1948 - Apr 24, 1948
- Flight to the West / [Original, Play] / Thomas Hickey / Dec 30, 1940 - Apr 26, 1941
- Johnny Johnson / [Original, Play, Play with music, Comedy] / German Priest and Orderly / Nov 19, 1936 - Jan 16, 1937
- Bitter Oleander / [Original, Play, Drama] / as Second Man / Feb 11, 1935 - Mar 1935
- Follow Thru / [Original, Musical, Comedy] / as Gentleman / Jan 9, 1929 - Dec 21, 1929

== Bibliography ==
- Goudsouzian, A. (2004). Sidney Poitier: Man, Actor, Icon, UNC Press, ISBN 9781469622934
