= America America =

1963 American dramatic film by Elia Kazan

- Film poster
- Directed by: Elia Kazan
- Screenplay by: Elia Kazan
- Based on: America, America; 1962 book by Elia Kazan
- Produced by: Elia Kazan
- Starring: Stathis Giallelis
- Narrated by: Elia Kazan
- Cinematography: Haskell Wexler
- Edited by: Dede Allen
- Music by: Manos Hadjidakis
- Distributed by: Warner Bros. Pictures
- Release date: December 15, 1963
- Running time: 174 minutes
- Country: United States
- Language: English

America America (British title The Anatolian Smile) is a 1963 American drama film directed, produced and written by Elia Kazan. It was inspired by the struggle of his uncle, Avraam Elia Kazantzoglou, to work his way to America, a land of dreams and opportunity. Kazan adapted the screenplay from his own 1962 book.

== Plot ==
In the late 1890s, a young Cappadocian Greek, Stavros Topouzoglou, lives in an impoverished village below Mount Erciyes in Ottoman Turkey. The subjugated life of the Cappadocian Greeks and Armenians of Kayseri is depicted, including the Derinkuyu Underground City traditional cliff cave dwellings, where Stavros' grandmother lives.

Stavros and his Armenian friend Vartan plan to go to the faraway land of opportunity – America – together. Stavros witnesses a Hamidian massacre against the Armenians, which leaves Vartan dead, and Stavros is nearly imprisoned trying to recover Vartan's mutilated corpse.

Knowing that the Greeks won't remain safe from the violent pogroms forever, the family plans to send Stavros to Constantinople, the Ottoman capital, to eventually settle the family there. He is entrusted by his father, Issac, with the family's entire fortune in money, jewels, rugs, whatever is greatest in value and transportable, including the family donkey.

Once successful, he is to send first for his sisters, then his brothers, and establish them safely and prosperously there as well. To do this he will invest in the carpet business of his father's cousin Odysseus by buying his way in with his family's meager accumulated wealth. Though this is his father's dream, it is not Stavros' as he is still determined to go to America.

Stavros' odyssey begins with a long voyage on donkey and on foot through the impoverished towns and villages of the Anatolian countryside. Along the way, a vagabond latches on to the naïve young dreamer and through guile attempts to take everything. Stavos goes to an Ottoman official to retrieve his property but instead is confiscated by the official. Stavos kills the unrepentant vagabond in retribution, and arrives at his cousin's home penniless. The older man, who had deceived Stavros' father, is deeply disappointed, as he was counting on Issac's wealth to rescue his failing carpet business. In an attempt to exploit a valuable opportunity Stavros still represents to him, Odysseus proposes that his handsome young cousin marry the plain and needy Thomna, daughter of a wealthy Greek carpet merchant, Aleko Sinnikoglou. Stavros realizes this would mean the end of his dream and adamantly refuses, abruptly leaving the angry cousin.

Now homeless on the streets, Stavros survives by eating discarded food and working at backbreaking and hazardous jobs. He is befriended by a streetwise older man, Garabet, who helps him toward his dream. After nine months of scrimping and self-denial, Stavros has saved nine Turkish pounds towards the 110 pound third class passage to New York, but he has every penny thieved by a prostitute in his first sexual encounter.

Clinging to Garabet, he ends up at a gathering of local anarchists planning a terrorist bombing. However, before they can disburse, they are slaughtered by police gunfire. Left for dead, Stavros ends up in a hospital, only to be thrown atop a wagon filled with dead bodies headed for disposal in the sea. He accidentally slides off and all but crawls back to his cousin's.

Odysseus takes pity on the young man and allows him to recover at his home. Broken for the moment, Stavros agrees to marry his intended bride. Before the ceremony she questions his sullen silence, and he admits that he still plans to emigrate to America by using her dowry money to buy a ticket as soon as he can slip away after they are wed.

At this point Stavros becomes reacquainted with Hohannes, a young Armenian whom he had aided with food and clothing before his original voyage to Constantinople. Hohannes informs him that he is being sponsored to America by an employer seeking indentured labor, two years' worth in return for passage. By good fortune, Stavros begins an affair with Sophia, the sexually neglected, middle-aged wife of wealthy Armenian-American rug merchant Artoon Kebabian, a client of his prospective father-in-law. Using money from Sophia, Stavros buys a ticket to New York and leaves Thomna heartbroken. He ends up on the same ship as the Kebabians, he in steerage, they in first class.

On the other side of the Atlantic the ship lies just offshore of New York City waiting to clear quarantine. Sophia sends her servant to fetch Stavros, and the two have a tryst while Artoon sleeps. He awakes, discovers the affair, and taunts Stavros, who responds by physically attacking Kebabian. Stavros is arrested and sentenced by the ship's captain to be returned to Turkey.

Hohannes, who is scarcely able to pass inspection by the visiting immigration doctor by hiding his advanced tuberculosis, realizes Stavros will die if he is sent back, and he will die anyway. Returning his friend's generosity, he jumps off the ship to his death. Now short a man, the prospective American employer simply allows Stavros to assume Hohannes' identity and slip past immigration officials on Ellis Island, gifted a straw boater by Sophia and a new 'American' name by the chief inspector, "Joe Arness".

In return, even though he had paid his own passage, “Joe” will have to work off Hohannes' debt by shining shoes, earning only his tips.

A closing voiceover reveals that Joe was able to succeed in New York, and one by one brought every family member over – but his father, who, last in the line, died before his chance came.

== Cast ==
- Stathis Giallelis as Stavros Topouzoglou
- Frank Wolff as Vartan Damadian
- Harry Davis as Isaac Topouzoglou
- Elena Karam as Vasso Topouzoglou
- Estelle Hemsley as Grandmother Topouzoglou
- Gregory Rozakis as Hohannes Gardashian
- Lou Antonio as Abdul
- Salem Ludwig as Odysseus Topouzoglou
- John Marley as Garabet
- Joanna Frank as Vartuhi
- Paul Mann as Aleko Sinnikoglou
- Linda Marsh as Thomna Sinnikoglou
- Robert H. Harris as Aratoon Kebabian
- Katharine Balfour as Sophia Kebabian

Uncredited:

- Giorgos Foundas
- Dimitris Nikolaidis

== Production ==
Inspired by the life of his uncle, Avraam Elia Kazantzoglou, Kazan used little-known cast members, with the entire story line revolving around the central performance of Greek actor Stathis Giallelis, twenty-one years old at the time of production, who is in virtually every scene of the nearly three-hour movie. Production began in 1962.

The production, hampered by loss of its original financial backers, on-location hostility from Turkish authorities and onlookers, as well as other problems, continued into 1963. Powerful elements within Turkey came to be convinced that the country's national institutions and historical perspective upon turn of the 20th century events would be unfavorably portrayed by the Greek director and, when Kazan decided to transfer the troubled production to Greece, customs officials confiscated the cans of what they considered to be finished film, but owing to a prescient switch of labels between exposed and unexposed product, the valuable cargo survived.

The picture was filmed on location at the Alfa Studios in Athens, Greece, as well in rural Greece, Istanbul, New York City, and at the Warner Bros. Studios in Hollywood, in 1.66:1 aspect ratio on 35-millimeter stock. Kazan makes a voice-only introduction during the opening scenes, a short voice-only epilogue in the closing scene, followed by a recitation of the lead actors and technical personnel of the film. Tom Holland narrates the picture.

== Release and reception ==
The film had its New York premiere on December 15, 1963.

=== Response ===
Between summer 1964 and spring 1965, it was seen in virtually every major Western European city. America America is one of Martin Scorsese's favorite films. On the review aggregator website Rotten Tomatoes, 67% of 9 critics' reviews are positive. Metacritic, which uses a weighted average, assigned the film a score of 72 out of 100, based on 12 critics, indicating "generally favorable" reviews.

=== Legacy ===
In 2001, America, America was selected for preservation in the National Film Registry of the Library of Congress being deemed "culturally, historically, or aesthetically significant".

=== Awards and nominations ===
Ceremony	Awards	Nominations
36th Academy Awards	Best Art Direction : Gene Callahan	Best Picture; Best Director : Elia Kazan; Best Original Screenplay : Elia Kazan
21st Golden Globe Awards	Best Director : Elia Kazan; Most Promising Newcomer – Male : Stathis Giallelis (ex æquo)	Best Motion Picture; Best Actor : Stathis Giallelis; Best Supporting Actor : Paul Mann & Gregory Rozakis; Best Supporting Actress : Linda Marsh; Best Film Promoting International Understanding
San Sebastián International Film Festival 1964	Golden Shell for best movie	
Directors Guild of America Awards 1964		Outstanding Directing – Feature Film : Elia Kazan
National Film Registry 2001	Selected for preservation by the Library of Congress as being "culturally, historically, or aesthetically significant".	

== VHS and DVD ==
Its VHS release came on November 28, 1994, and a French (region 2) DVD boxed set (with Kazan's Baby Doll and A Face in the Crowd) was released on December 3, 2002. The film was released by Warner Home Video on DVD in the US on February 8, 2011.
