= REO Speedwagon discography =

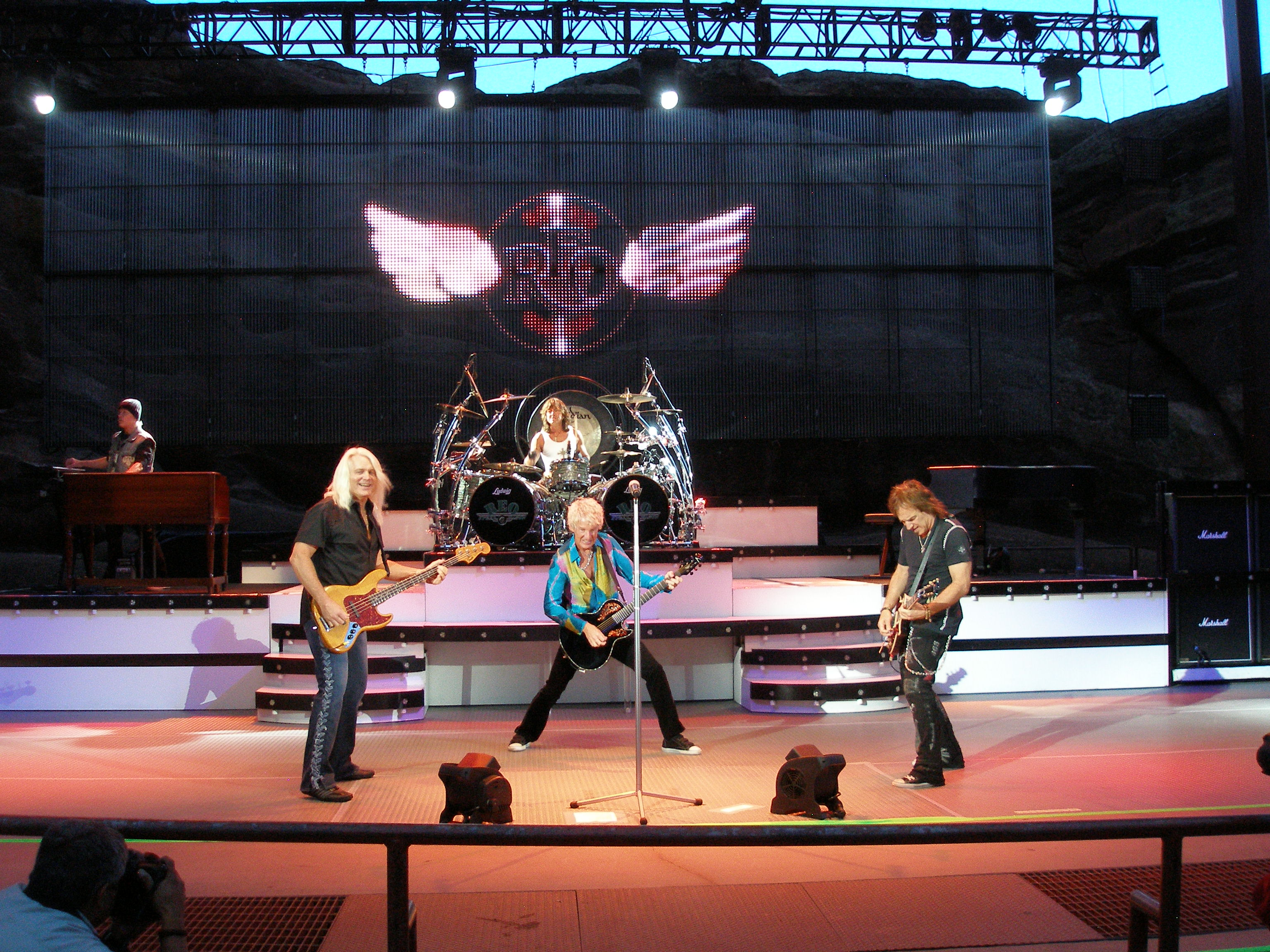
- REO Speedwagon performing at Red Rocks, 2010
- Studio albums: 16
- Live albums: 10
- Compilation albums: 22
- Singles: 34
- Video albums: 15
- Music videos: 30

This article lists the discography of the American rock band, REO Speedwagon. The band formed in the autumn of 1967 by Neal Doughty and Alan Gratzer. REO Speedwagon released their debut album, R.E.O. Speedwagon, in 1971. They have undergone many changes of personnel over the years, The members of the band as of January 2023 are Kevin Cronin, Bruce Hall, Dave Amato, and Bryan Hitt. (See also List of REO Speedwagon members.)

== Albums ==
=== Studio albums ===
Year	Title	Chart positions										Certifications (sales thresholds)
Year	Title	US	AUS	CAN	GER	NLD	NOR	NZ	SWE	SWI	UK	Certifications (sales thresholds)
1971	R.E.O. Speedwagon	—	—	—	—	—	—	—	—	—	—	
1972	R.E.O./T.W.O.	—	—	—	—	—	—	—	—	—	—	RIAA: Gold
1973	Ridin' the Storm Out	171	—	—	—	—	—	—	—	—	—	RIAA: Platinum
1974	Lost in a Dream	98	—	—	—	—	—	—	—	—	—	
1975	This Time We Mean It	74	—	—	—	—	—	—	—	—	—	
1976	R.E.O.	159	—	—	—	—	—	—	—	—	—	
1978	You Can Tune a Piano, but You Can't Tuna Fish	29	98	70	—	—	—	—	—	—	—	RIAA: 2× Platinum
1979	Nine Lives	33	—	52	—	—	—	—	—	—	—	RIAA: Gold
1980	Hi Infidelity	1	6	1	18	7	17	34	25	13	6	RIAA: Diamond; BPI: Silver; MC: 5× Platinum
1982	Good Trouble	7	—	18	17	39	7	—	18	—	29	RIAA: Platinum
1984	Wheels Are Turnin'	7	54	15	—	—	—	—	40	—	—	RIAA: 2× Platinum; MC: Platinum
1987	Life as We Know It	28	—	73	—	—	—	—	24	—	—	RIAA: Gold
1990	The Earth, a Small Man, His Dog and a Chicken	129	—	—	—	—	—	—	—	38	—	
1996	Building the Bridge	—	—	—	—	—	—	—	—	—	—	
2007	Find Your Own Way Home	—	—	—	—	—	—	—	—	—	—	
2009	Not So Silent Night ... Christmas with REO Speedwagon	—	—	—	—	—	—	—	—	—	—	
"—" denotes releases that did not chart

=== Live albums ===
Year	Title	Chart positions	Certifications
Year	Title	US	Certifications
1977	Live: You Get What You Play For	72	RIAA: Platinum
1978	Live Again (Note: Released only as a promotional record to radio stations.)	—	
2000	Arch Allies: Live at Riverport	—	
2001	Live-Plus	—	
2001	Extended Versions	—	RIAA: Gold
2007	Hi Infidelity Then Again ... Live	—	
2010	Setlist: The Very Best of REO Speedwagon Live	—	
2013	Live in Germany 1982	—	
2013	Live Chicago 1979	—	
2013	Live at Moondance Jam	—	
2015	Metro Center Rockford Illinois, 15 July 1983	—	
2024	Live at Rockplast, Hamburg, Germany, November 10, 1979	—	
"—" denotes releases that did not chart

=== Compilation albums ===
Year	Title	Chart positions			Certifications
Year	Title	US	CAN	NZ	Certifications
1980	A Decade of Rock and Roll 1970 to 1980	55	—	—	RIAA: Platinum
1985	Best Foot Forward	—	—	—	
1988	The Hits	56	62	—	RIAA: 4× Platinum; BPI: Silver
1991	The Second Decade of Rock and Roll 1981 to 1991	108	—	—	RIAA: Gold
1991	Keep on Loving You – Best	—	—	—	
1993	Starbox	—	—	—	
1995	Believe in Rock and Roll	—	—	—	
1998	Only the Strong Survive	—	—	—	
1998	Premium Best	—	—	—	
1999	The Ballads	—	—	—	
2001	Take It on the Run	—	—	—	BPI: Silver
2001	Simply the Best	—	—	—	
2001	Extended Versions: The Encore Collection	—	—	—	
2002	Keep on Rollin'	—	—	—	
2004	The Essential REO Speedwagon	—	—	—	
2005	Rock Breakout Years: 1981	—	—	—	
2006	Collections	—	—	—	
2008	Greatest Hits, Steel Box Collection	—	—	—	
2008	Playlist: The Very Best of REO Speedwagon	—	—	21	
2014	The Box Set Series	—	—	—	
2018	The Early Years 1971-1977	—	—	—	
2019	The Classic Years 1978-1990	—	—	—	
"—" denotes releases that did not chart

== Singles ==
Year	Title	Chart positions								Certifications (sales thresholds)	Album
Year	Title	U.S. CB	U.S.	US Rock	US AC	AUS	CAN	POL	UK	Certifications (sales thresholds)	Album
1972	"157 Riverside Avenue"	—	—	—	—	—	—	—	—		R.E.O. Speedwagon
1972	"Lay Me Down"	—	—	—	—	—	—	—	—		R.E.O. Speedwagon
1972	"Sophisticated Lady"		122	—	—	—	—	—	—		R.E.O. Speedwagon
1973	"Little Queenie"	— —	— —	— —	— —	— —	— —	— —	— —		R.E.O./T.W.O.
1973	"Ridin' the Storm Out"			—	—	—	—	—	—		Ridin' the Storm Out
1974	"Open Up"	—	—	—	—	—	—	—	—		Ridin' the Storm Out
1974	"Throw The Chains Away"	—	—	—	—	—	—	—	—		Lost in a Dream
1975	"Out of Control"	—	—	—	—	—	—	—	—		This Time We Mean It
1975	"Reelin'"	—	—	—	—	—	—	—	—		This Time We Mean It
1976	"Keep Pushin'"	—	—	—	—	—	—	—	—		R.E.O.
1977	"Ridin' the Storm Out" (Live)	97	94	—	—	—	—	—	—		You Get What You Play For
1978	"Roll with the Changes"	48	58	—	—	—	65	—	—		You Can Tune a Piano, but You Can't Tuna Fish
1978	"Time for Me to Fly"	70	56	—	—	—	90	—	—		You Can Tune a Piano, but You Can't Tuna Fish
1979	"Easy Money"	—	—	—	—	—	—	—	—		Nine Lives
1979	"Only the Strong Survive"	91	—	—	—	—	—	—	—		Nine Lives
1980	"Time for Me to Fly" [re-release]	72	77	—	—	—	—	—	—		A Decade of Rock and Roll: 1970 to 1980
1980	"Keep on Loving You"	1	1	9	—	3	2	—	7	RIAA: Platinum; BPI: Gold	Hi Infidelity
1981	"Take It on the Run"	4	5	6	—	30	4	—	19	RIAA: Gold	Hi Infidelity
1981	"Tough Guys" [airplay]	—	—	25	—	—	—	—	—		Hi Infidelity
1981	"Out of Season" [airplay]	—	—	59	—	—	—	—	—		Hi Infidelity
1981	"Don't Let Him Go"	26	24	11	—	—	10	—	—		Hi Infidelity
1981	"In Your Letter"	28	20	—	26	100	36	—	—		Hi Infidelity
1982	"Keep the Fire Burnin'"	10	7	2	—	—	10	8	—		Good Trouble
1982	"Stillness of the Night" [airplay]	—	—	19	—	—	—	—	—		Good Trouble
1982	"Good Trouble" [airplay]	—	—	51	—	—	—	—	—		Good Trouble
1982	"Sweet Time"	26	26	—	—	—	—	26	—		Good Trouble
1982	"The Key"	—	—	34	—	—	—	—	—		Good Trouble
1984	"I Do' Wanna Know"	28	29	5	—	—	52	—	—		Wheels Are Turnin'
1984	"Can't Fight This Feeling"	1	1	5	3	2	1	21	16	RIAA: Gold; BPI: Gold; MC: Gold	Wheels Are Turnin'
1985	"One Lonely Night"	24	19	17	10	—	35	34	—		Wheels Are Turnin'
1985	"Live Every Moment"	34	34	—	—	—	83	—	—		Wheels Are Turnin'
1985	"Wherever You're Goin' (It's Alright)" [Europe only release]	—	—	—	—	—	—	—	—		The Goonies: Original Motion Picture Soundtrack
1985	"Gotta Feel More" [radio promo]	—	—	—	—	—	—	—	—		Wheels Are Turnin'
1987	"That Ain't Love"	23	16	5	—	—	82	—	—		Life as We Know It
1987	"Variety Tonight"	66	60	28	—	—	—	—	—		Life as We Know It
1987	"In My Dreams"	18	19	—	6	—	61	—	—		Life as We Know It
1988	"Here with Me"	23	20	—	9	—	23	—	—		The Hits
1988	"I Don't Want To Lose You"	—	—	—	—	—	—	—	—		The Hits
1990	"Live It Up"	—	—	6	—	—	81	—	—		The Earth, a Small Man, His Dog and a Chicken
1990	"Love Is a Rock"	62	65	31	—	—	—	—	—		The Earth, a Small Man, His Dog and a Chicken
1991	"Half Way" (album cut)	115	—	—	—	—	—	—	—		The Earth, a Small Man, His Dog and a Chicken
1991	"All Heaven Broke Loose" (album cut)	107	—	—	—	—	—	—	—		The Earth, a Small Man, His Dog and a Chicken
1999	"Just For You" [U.S. promo]	—	—	—	—	—	—	—	—		The Ballads
2007	"Smilin' In The End" [U.S. promo]	—	—	—	—	—	—	—	—		Find Your Own Way Home
2007	"I Needed to Fall"	—	—	—	25	—	—	—	—		Find Your Own Way Home
2008	"Find Your Own Way Home"	—	—	—	23	—	—	—	—		Find Your Own Way Home
2009	"I Believe In Santa Claus" [U.S. promo]	—	—	—	—	—	—	—	—		Non-album single
2009	"Can't Stop Rockin" (with Styx)	—	—	—	23	—	—	—	—		Non-album single
2010	"Silent Night" [airplay]	—	—	—	—	—	— (Note: Silent Night did not enter the Canadian Hot 100, but peaked at number 50 on the Canada Adult Contemporary chart.)	—	—		Not So Silent Night ... Christmas with REO Speedwagon
"—" denotes releases that did not chart

Note: REO Speedwagon has several songs that never charted as singles but occasionally obtain airplay on classic rock stations. Those include "Keep Pushin'", "Back on the Road Again", "Golden Country", "Like You Do", and "Only the Strong Survive". Although listed here because they charted on the Mainstream Rock charts, "Tough Guys", "Out of Season", "Stillness of the Night" and "Good Trouble" were not released as singles.

== Videography ==
=== Video albums ===
Year	Title	Format
1978	FM	VHS/LaserDisc/DVD
1981	Live Infidelity	VHS/LaserDisc
1985	Wheels Are Turnin'	VHS/LaserDisc
1991	A Video Anthology 1978–1990	VHS/LaserDisc
2000	Arch Allies: Live at Riverport	VHS/DVD
2001	Live-Plus	VHS/DVD
2002	Real Artist Working	VHS/DVD
2004	Live Aid (1985)	DVD
2007	XM Artists Confidential	DVD
2008	Soundstage	DVD/Blu-ray
2010	Not So Silent Night...Christmas with REO Speedwagon, The Yule Log DVD	DVD
2012	Out of Nowhere: Champaign Music Scene Documentary	DVD
2013	Live in Germany 1982	DVD
2013	Live at Moondance Jam	DVD/Blu-ray
2014	Chicago & REO Speedwagon – Live at Red Rocks 2014	Live TV performance
2020	Japanese Singles Collection: Greatest Hits	CD/DVD

=== Music videos ===
Year	Title	Director
1977	"Ridin' the Storm Out-Live"	
1978	"Roll with the Changes"	Arnold Levine
1980	"Keep on Loving You"	
1981	"Time for Me to Fly"	Jay Dubin
1981	"Tough Guys"	
1981	"Take It on the Run"	Jay Dubin
1981	"Don't Let Him Go"	
1981	"In Your Letter"	
1982	"Girl with the Heart of Gold"	Bruce Gowers
1982	"I'll Follow You"	Bruce Gowers
1982	"The Key"	Bruce Gowers
1982	"Back in My Heart Again"	Bruce Gowers
1982	"Stillness of the Night"	Bruce Gowers
1982	"Good Trouble"	Bruce Gowers
1982	"Keep the Fire Burnin'"	Bruce Gowers
1982	"Sweet Time"	Bruce Gowers
1984	"I Do' Wanna Know"	Sherry Revord & Kevin Dole
1985	"Can't Fight This Feeling" (version 1)	Sherry Revord & Kevin Dole
1985	"Can't Fight This Feeling" (version 2: performance)	John Jopson
1985	"One Lonely Night"	Sherry Revord & Kevin Dole
1985	"Live Every Moment"	
1985	"Wheels Are Turnin'"	Kim Paul Friedman
1985	"Wherever You're Goin' (It's Alright)"	
1987	"That Ain't Love"	
1987	"Variety Tonight"	Jim Yukich
1987	"In My Dreams"	Bruce Gowers
1988	"Here with Me"	Jim Yukich
1988	"I Don't Want to Lose You"	Jim Yukich
1990	"Live It Up"	Mark Rezyka
2009	"Can't Stop Rockin'"	

== Personnel ==
Year	Album	Vocals	Guitar	Keyboards		Bass	Drums	Producer
1971	R.E.O. Speedwagon	Terry Luttrell	Gary Richrath	Neal Doughty		Gregg Philbin	Alan Gratzer	Paul Leka, Billy Rose II
1972	R.E.O./T.W.O.	Kevin Cronin	Gary Richrath	Neal Doughty		Gregg Philbin	Alan Gratzer	Paul Leka, Billy Rose II
1973	Ridin' the Storm Out	Mike Murphy	Gary Richrath	Neal Doughty		Gregg Philbin	Alan Gratzer	Bill Halverson
1974	Lost in a Dream	Mike Murphy	Gary Richrath	Neal Doughty		Gregg Philbin	Alan Gratzer	Bill Halverson
1975	This Time We Mean It	Mike Murphy	Gary Richrath	Neal Doughty		Gregg Philbin	Alan Gratzer	Allan Blazek, Bill Szymczyk
1976	R.E.O.	Kevin Cronin	Gary Richrath	Neal Doughty		Gregg Philbin	Alan Gratzer	John Stronach
1978	You Can Tune a Piano but You Can't Tuna Fish	Kevin Cronin	Gary Richrath	Neal Doughty		Bruce Hall	Alan Gratzer	Kevin Cronin, Gary Richrath, Paul Grupp, John Boylan
1979	Nine Lives	Kevin Cronin	Gary Richrath	Neal Doughty		Bruce Hall	Alan Gratzer	Kevin Cronin, Gary Richrath, Kevin Beamish
1980	Hi Infidelity	Kevin Cronin	Gary Richrath	Neal Doughty		Bruce Hall	Alan Gratzer	Kevin Beamish, Kevin Cronin, Alan Gratzer, Gary Richrath
1982	Good Trouble	Kevin Cronin	Gary Richrath	Neal Doughty		Bruce Hall	Alan Gratzer	Kevin Beamish, Kevin Cronin, Alan Gratzer, Gary Richrath
1984	Wheels Are Turnin'	Kevin Cronin	Gary Richrath	Neal Doughty		Bruce Hall	Alan Gratzer	Kevin Cronin, Gary Richrath, Alan Gratzer
1987	Life as We Know It	Kevin Cronin	Gary Richrath	Neal Doughty		Bruce Hall	Alan Gratzer	Kevin Cronin, Gary Richrath, Alan Gratzer, David DeVore
1990	The Earth, a Small Man, His Dog and a Chicken	Kevin Cronin	Dave Amato	Neal Doughty	Jesse Harms	Bruce Hall	Bryan Hitt	Kevin Cronin, Tom Lord-Alge
1996	Building the Bridge	Kevin Cronin	Dave Amato	Neal Doughty		Bruce Hall	Bryan Hitt	Greg Ladanyi, Steve Croes
2007	Find Your Own Way Home	Kevin Cronin	Dave Amato	Neal Doughty		Bruce Hall	Bryan Hitt	Joe Vannelli, Kevin Cronin
2009	Not So Silent Night ... Christmas with REO Speedwagon	Kevin Cronin	Dave Amato	Neal Doughty		Bruce Hall	Bryan Hitt	Joe Vannelli, Kevin Cronin
