= List of REO Speedwagon members =

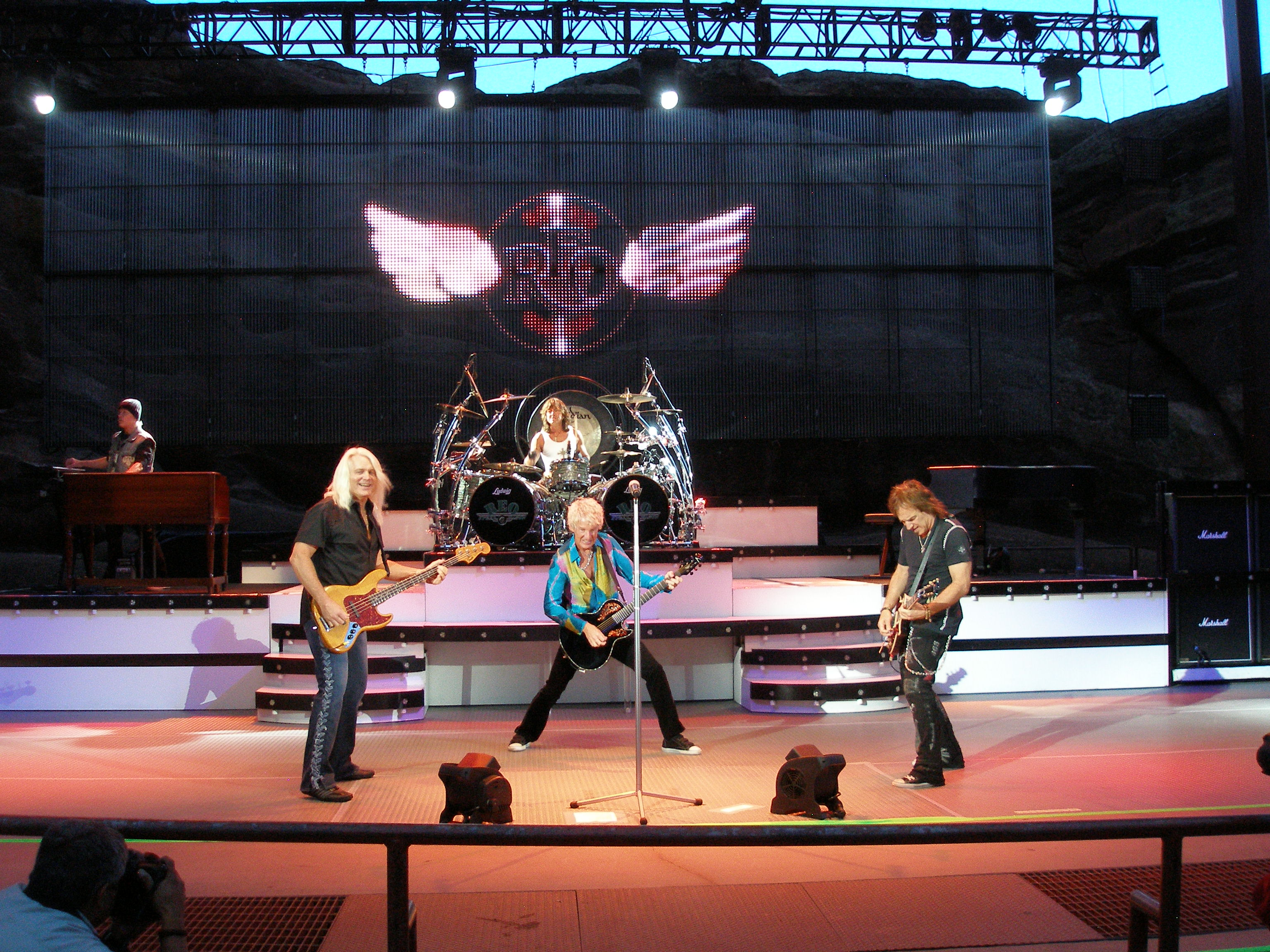
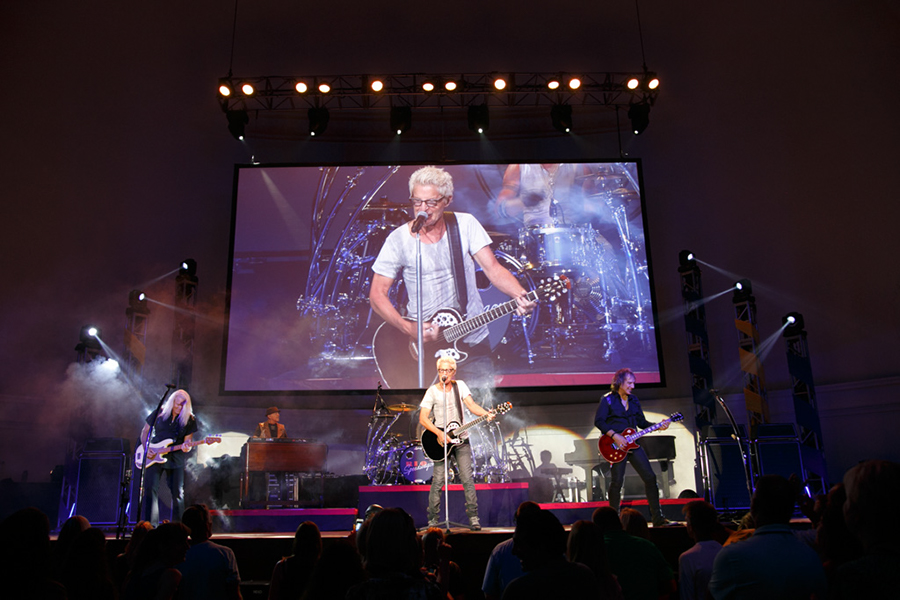
REO Speedwagon performing live in 2010 (top) and 2016 (bottom).

REO Speedwagon was an American hard rock band from Champaign, Illinois. Formed in 1967, the group originally included drummer and backing vocalist Alan Gratzer, guitarist and lead vocalist Joe Matt, bassist and vocalist Mike Blair, and keyboardist Neal Doughty. Matt left early the next year after graduating from school, with Terry Luttrell taking his place on lead vocals. Bob Crownover took over as the band's guitarist, but was replaced after a brief tenure by Bill Fiorio and later Steve Scorfina. Blair left a few months after Matt, with Gregg Philbin taking his place. The band also briefly added saxophonist Joe McCabe and trumpeter Marty Shepard to its lineup in 1968.

By late 1970, REO Speedwagon had finalized its first recording lineup with the addition of guitarist Gary Richrath in place of Scorfina. In early 1972, shortly after the release of the band's self-titled debut album, Luttrell left REO Speedwagon following a disagreement with Richrath. The vocalist was replaced by Kevin Cronin, who performed on the group's second album R.E.O./T.W.O. before leaving during sessions for the 1973 follow-up. Mike Murphy took over and recorded Ridin' the Storm Out, Lost in a Dream and This Time We Mean It, but was replaced by a returning Cronin in 1976. Philbin left the following year, with Bruce Hall taking his place.

The band's lineup remained stable thereafter for more than ten years until Gratzer decided to retire in 1988, with Graham Lear brought in as his replacement. Richrath also left early the next year, with Miles Joseph filling in for a show before Dave Amato took over in May. Also in 1989, Bryan Hitt replaced Lear on drums, while Jesse Harms joined as a second keyboardist, performing on the band's 1990 album The Earth, a Small Man, His Dog and a Chicken. Following the end of Harms's brief tenure with the group, REO Speedwagon retained a consistent lineup of Neal Doughty, Kevin Cronin, Dave Amato, Bruce Hall, and Bryan Hitt for 32 years, until February 2023 when Doughty announced he was retiring from touring. His touring replacement was announced as former Iron Butterfly and Whitesnake member Derek Hilland.

Hall was replaced on tour in November 2023 by Matt Bissonnette after Hall received back surgery. Following his full recovery, after which he did not return, his and Doughty's disagreements with Cronin led to the band's split at the end of 2024.

On June 14, 2025, REO Speedwagon, without Cronin, reunited for a one-off show in its hometown, Champaign, Illinois, at the State Farm Center. The show featured Doughty, Hall, and Gratzer (in his first performance since 1988), alongside Mike Murphy and vocal/guitar trio Levon. Other former members Terry Luttrell and Steve Scorfina performed a four-song opening set. Richrath's son, Eric, also guested with the band.

On September 28, 2025, the band's classic lineup (minus Gary Richrath) reunited onstage for a performance alongside the University of Illinois Marching Illini for the university's homecoming halftime show. While Cronin did not sing (as the melodies were provided by the marching band), it was the first time Doughty, Gratzer, Hall and Cronin shared a stage since December 31, 1988.

This lineup reunited again on March 7, 2026, as Doughty, Gratzer, Hall, and Cronin marked the opening of an exhibit honoring Richrath at the Peoria Riverfront Museum. They were joined by Murphy and Eric Richrath. The band played four songs, including "Ridin' the Storm Out", during which Cronin and Murphy traded lead vocals in the first time the two ever performed together. This was also Gratzer's first performance with Cronin since 1988.

== Members ==
Image	Name	Years active	Instruments	Release contributions
	Neal Doughty	1967–2024 (not touring 2023–24)	keyboards; organ; piano; synthesizer	all REO Speedwagon releases
	Alan Gratzer	1967–1988 (occasional live guest 2005–2017)	drums; percussion; backing vocals	all REO Speedwagon releases from R.E.O. Speedwagon (1971) to The Hits (1988)
	Mike Blair	1967–1968	bass; vocals	none
	Joe Matt	1967–1968	guitar; lead vocals	none
	Terry Luttrell	1968–1972; (one-off guest 2025)	lead vocals	R.E.O. Speedwagon (1971)
	Bob Crownover	1968–1969	guitar	none
	Gregg Philbin	1968–1977 (died 2022)	bass; backing vocals	all REO Speedwagon releases from R.E.O. Speedwagon (1971) to Live: You Get What You Play For (1977)
	Joe McCabe	1968	saxophone	none
	Marty Shepard	1968	trumpet	none
	Bill Fiorio	1969	guitar	none
	Steve Scorfina	1969–1970; (one-off guest in 2025)	guitar	none
	Gary Richrath	1970–1989 (died 2015)	lead guitar; backing and lead vocals	all REO Speedwagon releases from R.E.O. Speedwagon (1971) to The Hits (1988)
	Kevin Cronin	1972–1973; 1976–2024	lead and backing vocals; rhythm guitar; piano	R.E.O./T.W.O. (1972); all REO Speedwagon releases from R.E.O. (1976) to Not So Silent Night ... Christmas with REO Speedwagon (2009)
	Mike Murphy	1973–1975 (one-off guest in 2025, 2026)	lead and backing vocals; rhythm guitar	Ridin' the Storm Out (1973); Lost in a Dream (1974); This Time We Mean It (1975)
	Bruce Hall	1977–2024 (not touring late 2023–24)	bass; backing and lead vocals	all REO Speedwagon releases from You Can Tune a Piano, but You Can't Tuna Fish (1978) to Not So Silent Night ... Christmas with REO Speedwagon (2009)
	Graham Lear	1988–1989	drums	The Second Decade of Rock and Roll: 1981 to 1991 (1991)
	Miles Joseph	1989 (died 2012)	lead guitar	none
	Carla Day	1989	backing vocals	none
	Melanie Jackson	1989	backing vocals	none
	Dave Amato	1989–2024	lead guitar; backing vocals	all REO Speedwagon releases from The Earth, a Small Man, His Dog and a Chicken (1990) to Not So Silent Night ... Christmas with REO Speedwagon (2009)
	Bryan Hitt	1989–2024	drums; percussion	all REO Speedwagon releases from The Earth, a Small Man, His Dog and a Chicken (1990) to Not So Silent Night ... Christmas with REO Speedwagon (2009)
	Jesse Harms	1989–1991	keyboards; backing vocals	The Earth, a Small Man, His Dog and a Chicken (1990)

=== Touring ===
Image	Name	Years active	Instruments	Release contributions
	John Aldridge	2005–2024	percussion; occasional drums	John Aldridge, Bryan Hitt's drum tech since July 2005, performed additional percussion parts live from around July 2005 until the band broke up in 2024. He also performed drums at soundchecks when Bryan was running late.
	Joe Vannelli	2007 (substitute)	keyboards; organ; piano; synthesizer	Doughty was absent from the REO Speedwagon Unplugged Live in Washington XM Radio show in early April 2007, with producer Joe Vannelli filling-in on keyboards. Vannelli also performed piano, Hammond organ, and synthesizer on the 2007 album Find Your Own Way Home.
	Derek Hilland	2023–2024 (substitute)	keyboards; organ; piano; synthesizer	Permanent substitute for Doughty after his retirement, from January 2023.
	Matt Bissonette	2023–2024 (substitute)	bass; vocals	Permanent substitute for Hall, from November 2023.

== Lineups ==
Period	Members	Releases
Fall 1967 – early 1968	Joe Matt – lead vocals, guitar; Mike Blair – bass, backing vocals; Neal Doughty – keyboards, piano; Alan Gratzer – drums, backing vocals	none
Early – summer 1968	Terry Luttrell – lead vocals; Bob Crownover – guitar; Mike Blair – bass, backing vocals; Neal Doughty – keyboards, piano; Alan Gratzer – drums, backing vocals	none
Summer – late 1968	Terry Luttrell – lead vocals; Bob Crownover – guitar; Gregg Philbin – bass, backing vocals; Neal Doughty – keyboards, piano; Alan Gratzer – drums, backing vocals; Joe McCabe – saxophone; Marty Shepard – trumpet	none
Late 1968 – summer 1969	Terry Luttrell – lead vocals; Bob Crownover – guitar; Gregg Philbin – bass, backing vocals; Neal Doughty – keyboards, piano; Alan Gratzer – drums, backing vocals	none
Summer – late 1969	Terry Luttrell – lead vocals; Bill Fiorio – guitar; Gregg Philbin – bass, backing vocals; Neal Doughty – keyboards, piano; Alan Gratzer – drums, backing vocals	none
Late 1969 – late 1970	Terry Luttrell – lead vocals; Steve Scorfina – guitar; Gregg Philbin – bass, backing vocals; Neal Doughty – keyboards, piano; Alan Gratzer – drums, backing vocals	none
Late 1970 – early 1972	Terry Luttrell – lead vocals; Gary Richrath – guitar; Gregg Philbin – bass, backing vocals; Neal Doughty – keyboards, piano; Alan Gratzer – drums, backing vocals	R.E.O. Speedwagon (1971)
Early 1972 – mid-1973	Kevin Cronin – lead vocals, rhythm guitar; Gary Richrath – lead guitar, backing vocals; Gregg Philbin – bass, backing vocals; Neal Doughty – keyboards, piano; Alan Gratzer – drums, backing vocals	R.E.O./T.W.O. (1972)
Mid-1973 – January 1976	Mike Murphy – lead and backing vocals; Gary Richrath – guitar, backing and lead vocals; Gregg Philbin – bass, backing vocals; Neal Doughty – keyboards, piano; Alan Gratzer – drums, backing vocals	Ridin' the Storm Out (1973); Lost in a Dream (1974); This Time We Mean It (1975)
January 1976 – early 1977	Kevin Cronin – lead and backing vocals, rhythm guitar; Gary Richrath – lead guitar, lead and backing vocals; Gregg Philbin – bass, backing vocals; Neal Doughty – keyboards, piano; Alan Gratzer – drums, backing vocals	R.E.O. (1976); Live: You Get What You Play For (1977)
Early 1977 – September 1988	Kevin Cronin – lead vocals, rhythm guitar, piano; Gary Richrath – lead guitar, backing vocals; Bruce Hall – bass, vocals; Neal Doughty – keyboards, piano; Alan Gratzer – drums, backing vocals	You Can Tune a Piano, but You Can't Tuna Fish (1978); Nine Lives (1979); Hi Infidelity (1980); Good Trouble (1982); Wheels Are Turnin' (1984); Life as We Know It (1987); Live in Germany 1982 (2013); Live Chicago 1979 (2013); Metro Center Rockford Illinois (2015)
September 1988 – early 1989	Kevin Cronin – lead vocals, rhythm guitar, piano; Gary Richrath – lead guitar, backing vocals; Bruce Hall – bass, vocals; Neal Doughty – keyboards, piano; Graham Lear – drums	none
Early – spring 1989	Kevin Cronin – lead vocals, rhythm guitar, piano; Miles Joseph – lead guitar; Bruce Hall – bass, vocals; Neal Doughty – keyboards, piano; Graham Lear – drums; Carla Day – backing vocals; Melanie Jackson – backing vocals	none
Summer 1989 – early 1991	Kevin Cronin – lead vocals, rhythm guitar; Dave Amato – lead guitar, backing vocals; Bruce Hall – bass, vocals; Neal Doughty – keyboards, piano; Jesse Harms – keyboards, piano, backing vocals; Bryan Hitt – drums, percussion	The Earth, a Small Man, His Dog and a Chicken (1990)
Early 1991 – December 2024	Kevin Cronin – lead vocals, rhythm guitar, piano; Dave Amato – lead guitar, backing vocals; Bruce Hall – bass, vocals; Neal Doughty – keyboards, piano; Bryan Hitt – drums, percussion; Notes: Derek Hilland substituted for Doughty 2023-2024. Matt Bissonette replaced Bruce Hall in early 2024.	Building the Bridge (1996); Arch Allies: Live at Riverport (2000); Live Plus (2001); Find Your Own Way Home (2007); "Can't Stop Rockin'" (2009); Not So Silent Night ... Christmas with REO Speedwagon (2009)
