= The Ballads (REO Speedwagon album) =

Compilation album by REO Speedwagon
- Released: August 3, 1999
- Recorded: 1978–99
- Genre: Rock, soft rock
- Length: 55:30
- Label: Epic
- Producer: Various

REO Speedwagon chronology
| Building the Bridge (1996) | The Ballads (1999) | Find Your Own Way Home (2007) |

The Ballads is a 1999 compilation album by REO Speedwagon. It features some of the band's previously recorded hit ballads as well as two new songs, Just For You and Til The Rivers Run Dry.

Professional ratings
Review scores
| Source | Rating |
|---|---|
| Allmusic | link |

== Track listing ==
| No. | Title | Writer(s) | Length |
|---|---|---|---|
| 1. | "Just for You" | Kevin Cronin, Jim Peterik | 4:38 |
| 2. | "Time for Me to Fly" | Kevin Cronin | 3:37 |
| 3. | "Keep On Loving You" | Kevin Cronin | 3:22 |
| 4. | "Can't Fight This Feeling" | Kevin Cronin | 4:54 |
| 5. | "Take It on the Run" | Gary Richrath | 4:00 |
| 6. | "Til the Rivers Run Dry" | Kevin Cronin, Jimmy Scott | 4:14 |
| 7. | "In My Dreams" | Kevin Cronin, Tom Kelly | 4:30 |
| 8. | "Here with Me" | Kevin Cronin, Rick Braun | 5:05 |
| 9. | "Building the Bridge" | Kevin Cronin | 4:15 |
| 10. | "One Lonely Night" | Neal Doughty | 3:21 |
| 11. | "The Heart Survives" | Kevin Cronin, Jesse Harms | 4:51 |
| 12. | "After Tonight" | Bruce Hall | 4:09 |
| 13. | "I Wish You Were There" | Kevin Cronin | 4:28 |

Taiwan bonus tracks
| No. | Title | Writer(s) | Length |
|---|---|---|---|
| 14. | "Love is a Rock" | Kevin Cronin | 5:32 |
| 15. | "Live Every Moment" | Kevin Cronin | 5.01 |
| 16. | "Keep On Loving You '89" | Kevin Cronin | 3:57 |
| Total length: | | | 70:07 |

== Personnel ==
REO Speedwagon

- Kevin Cronin - lead vocals, rhythm guitar
- Dave Amato - lead guitar, backing vocals on tracks 1, 6, 9, 11, 12 and 14
- Neal Doughty - keyboards
- Bruce Hall - bass, backing vocals
- Bryan Hitt - drums on tracks 1, 6, 9, 11, 12 and 14

== Other Personnel ==
- Gary Richrath - lead guitar on tracks 2, 3, 4, 5, 7, 8, 10, 13, 15 and 16
- Alan Gratzer - drums, backing vocals on tracks 2, 3, 4, 5, 7, 8, 10, 13 and 15
- Jesse Harms - keyboards on tracks 11 and 14
- Graham Lear - drums on track 16

== Release history ==
| Region | Date | Label | Format | Catalog # |
|---|---|---|---|---|
| USA | August 3, 1999 | Epic Records | CD | EK 69425 |
| USA | August 3, 1999 | Epic Records | Tape | 69425 |
| Taiwan | September 14, 1999 | Epic Records | CD (bonus tracks) | 495499.2 |
| UK | January 17, 2000 | Epic Records | CD | 4953242 |
