= 157 Riverside Avenue =

Single by REO Speedwagon

from the album REO Speedwagon
- B-side: "Five Men Were Killed Today"
- Released: 21 March 1972 (US)
- Recorded: 1970
- Genre: Blues rock, rockabilly revival
- Length: 3:57
- Label: Epic
- Songwriters: Terry Luttrell, Alan Gratzer, Gregg Philbin, Gary Richrath, Neal Doughty
- Producers: Paul Leka, Billy Rose II

REO Speedwagon singles chronology
"157 Riverside Avenue" (1972)	"Lay Me Down" (1972)

"157 Riverside Avenue" is a song by REO Speedwagon from their first album, REO Speedwagon, released in 1971. It was written by all five band members at the time, Terry Luttrell, Gary Richrath, Gregg Philbin, Neal Doughty, and Alan Gratzer. The title refers to the Westport, Connecticut address where the band stayed while recording that album. On March 29, 2012, the house the band stayed in was torn down to make way for a new house.

Record World said it was "plain effective boogie music."

The song is a standard at the band's live performances, as it has been for many years. Where the original studio version clocked in at only 3:57, live performances include a bass solo in addition to the song's piano and guitar solos, honky-tonk piano work, and an extended interlude where lead vocalist Kevin Cronin tells a story that leads up to a "conversation" between him and lead guitarist Gary Richrath (later Dave Amato) where the guitarist's side consists of guitar solos while Kevin's side is scat vocals. The version of the song on Live: You Get What You Play For is 7:38 in length. An even longer version (12:22) was included on the compilation album A Decade of Rock and Roll: 1970-1980, and a third live version (with Amato) appears on Arch Allies: Live at Riverport at a length of 7:39.

The longest recorded version of the song is listed as 13:37 in length, found on the Live Chicago 1979 Live Radio Broadcast CD, performed during the band's Nine Lives tour. However, 37 seconds of the song's introduction was tacked on to the end of the preceding song. That included, the song is actually performed for a total of 14:14.

== Personnel ==
REO Speedwagon

- Terry Luttrell – lead vocals
- Gary Richrath – guitar
- Neal Doughty – keyboards
- Gregg Philbin – bass
- Alan Gratzer – drums
