= R.E.O. (album) =

Studio album by REO Speedwagon
- Released: June 1976
- Recorded: January 1976
- Studios: Criteria Studios, Miami
- Genre: Rock
- Length: 33:25
- Label: Epic
- Producer: John Stronach

REO Speedwagon chronology
This Time We Mean It (1975)	R.E.O. (1976)	Live: You Get What You Play For (1977)

Singles from R.E.O.
- 1. "Keep Pushin'" Released: 1976

Professional ratings
Review scores
Source	Rating
Allmusic	2.5/5 stars

R.E.O. is the sixth studio album by REO Speedwagon, released in 1976. It peaked at number 159 on the Billboard 200 chart in 1976. It marked the return of Kevin Cronin to the band after a four-year absence. Five of the songs ("Keep Pushin", "Any Kind of Love", "(Only A) Summer Love", "(I Believe) Our Time Is Gonna Come", and "Flying Turkey Trot") were featured on the band's subsequent live album, Live: You Get What You Play For.

This was the band's last studio album to feature bassist Gregg Philbin, who departed citing the band's more commercial ambitions and was replaced by Bruce Hall the following year. The album is uncommon in having lead vocals shared by Kevin Cronin and Gary Richrath; on previous albums (Ridin' the Storm Out, Lost in a Dream, This Time We Mean It) Richrath only sang one song per. When Hall joined in 1977, Richrath fully ceased singing lead.

== Track listing ==
Side one
No.	Title	Writer(s)	Length
1.	"Keep Pushin'"	Kevin Cronin	4:06
2.	"Any Kind of Love"	Gary Richrath	3:39
3.	"(Only A) Summer Love"	Richrath	4:38
4.	"(I Believe) Our Time Is Gonna Come"	Cronin	5:04

Side two
No.	Title	Writer(s)	Length
5.	"Breakaway"	Cronin, Richrath	4:15
6.	"Flying Turkey Trot" (Instrumental)	Richrath	2:36
7.	"Tonight"	Richrath	3:14
8.	"Lightning"	Cronin, Richrath	5:52

== Personnel ==
REO Speedwagon

- Kevin Cronin – lead vocals (tracks 1, 2, 4, 5, 8), rhythm guitar
- Gary Richrath – lead guitar, lead vocals (tracks 2, 3, 5, 7)
- Neal Doughty – keyboards
- Gregg Philbin – bass
- Alan Gratzer – drums

== Charts ==
Chart (1976)	Peak position
US Billboard 200	159

== Release history ==
Region	Date	Title	Label	Format	Catalog #
USA	June 1976	R.E.O.	Epic Records	Stereo Vinyl	E-34143
USA	1976	R.E.O.	Epic Records	Cassette Tape	PET-34143
USA	1976	R.E.O.	Epic Records	8-Track Tape	PEA-34143
USA	1991	R.E.O.	Epic Records	CD	EK-34143
UK	2010	This Time We Mean It / R.E.O.	BGO Records	CD (Digitally re-mastered)	BGOCD961
Japan	2011	R.E.O.	Sony Music	CD (DSD-Remaster)	EICP 1485
