= Live Again =

Live Again may refer to:

- Live Again (TV series), a 2007 Singaporean Mandarin-language drama
- Live Again (album), a live album by Silly Wizard, 2012
- Live...Again: Live at Montreux, a live album by Don Pullen and the African-Brazilian Connection, 1993
- Live Again!, a live album by Israel Vibration, 1997
- Live Again, a live extended play by REO Speedwagon, 1978
- "Live Again" (Sevendust song), 2002
- "Live Again", a song by Better Than Ezra from How Does Your Garden Grow?, 1998
- "Live Again", a song by the Chemical Brothers from For That Beautiful Feeling, 2023
- "Live Again", a song by Ying Yang Twins featuring Adam Levine from U.S.A. (United State of Atlanta), 2005
- "Live Again (The Fall of Man)", a song by Bad Religion from The Empire Strikes First, 2004

== See also ==
- I Live Again, a 1936 British film directed by Arthur Maude
- Alive Again (disambiguation)
- To Live Again (disambiguation)
