= I Needed to Fall =

Single by REO Speedwagon

from the album Find Your Own Way Home
- Released: March 2008
- Genre: Rock
- Length: 4:08
- Label: Speedwagon/Mailboat
- Songwriter(s): Kevin Cronin
- Producer(s): Kevin Cronin; Joe Vannelli

REO Speedwagon singles chronology
"Smilin' In the End" (2007)	"I Needed to Fall" (2008)	"Find Your Own Way Home" (2008)

"I Needed to Fall" is a song written by Kevin Cronin and performed by REO Speedwagon for their 2007 album, Find Your Own Way Home. The song was released as the first single from the album, and charted on the Adult Contemporary chart at #25.
