= Little Miss Dangerous =

Studio album by Ted Nugent
- Released: March 4, 1986
- Recorded: April–July, October-November 1985
- Studios: Channel Recording (Burbank), Criteria, (Miami)
- Genres: Hard rock, glam metal
- Length: 38:32
- Label: Atlantic
- Producers: Peter Solley, Michael Verdick, Ted Nugent, Doug Banker

Ted Nugent chronology
| Penetrator (1984) | Little Miss Dangerous (1986) | If You Can't Lick 'Em...Lick 'Em (1988) |

Singles from Little Miss Dangerous
- 1. "High Heels in Motion" Released: April 1986; 2. "Little Miss Dangerous" Released: July 1986; 3. "My Little Red Book" Released: 1986

Little Miss Dangerous is the ninth studio album by American hard rock guitarist Ted Nugent. It was released in March 1986 by Atlantic Records.

The single "Little Miss Dangerous" was Ted Nugent's most successful single in Australia. The track was featured in an episode of the same name of the American television series Miami Vice. The track "Angry Young Man" was also used in an episode of Miami Vice entitled "Definitely Miami", in which Nugent guest-starred as a pimp/drug dealer and was killed in a shoot-out with Sonny Crockett (Don Johnson).

A promotional video clip was produced for the song "Little Miss Dangerous".

== History and Nomads (1986) ==
The album was recorded between April and November of 1985. Apart from being heavily influenced by Glam metal, the sound was also influenced by Nugent's work on the 1986 film Nomads which he composed and recorded in 1984. The song "Strangers" performed vocally by Dave Amato was composed for the film with Bill Conti and reused in its entirety on the album, the song "Dancing Mary" was reused instrumentally in "Savage Dancer", also "Painkiller" features a drum pattern and riffs similar to the scene near the end of the movie where the group of ghost punks attacks the protagonist's house.

== Reception ==
Professional ratings
Review scores
| Source | Rating |
|---|---|
| AllMusic | 1.5/5 stars |
| Classic Rock | 5/10 stars |
| Collector's Guide to Heavy Metal | 7/10 |

AllMusic's John Franck was heavily dismissive of Little Miss Dangerous, stating that it may be "the worst Ted Nugent record ever released", and being "a sonic embarrassment" to be "avoid[ed] at all costs".

== Track listing ==
All songs written and arranged by Ted Nugent, except where indicated

Side one
| No. | Title | Writer(s) | Length |
|---|---|---|---|
| 1. | "High Heels in Motion" | | 3:35 |
| 2. | "Strangers" | Bill Conti, Nugent | 3:53 |
| 3. | "Little Miss Dangerous" | | 4:50 |
| 4. | "Savage Dancer" | | 3:55 |
| 5. | "Crazy Ladies" | | 3:43 |

Side two
| No. | Title | Writer(s) | Length |
|---|---|---|---|
| 6. | "When Your Body Talks" | Ben Shultz, Eric Scott | 3:16 |
| 7. | "Little Red Book" | Burt Bacharach, Hal David | 3:06 |
| 8. | "Take Me Away" | Dave Amato, Nugent | 3:14 |
| 9. | "Angry Young Man" | | 3:57 |
| 10. | "Painkiller" | | 6:02 |

== Personnel ==
Band members

- Ted Nugent – guitars, six-string bass, percussion, lead and backing vocals, producer, mixing
- Dave Amato – rhythm guitar, guitar synthesizer, synthesizer, lead and backing vocals

Additional musicians

- Patrick Leonard, David 'Hawk' Wolinski, Lawrence Dermer – keyboards and synthesizers
- Ricky Phillips – bass, background vocals
- Jay Ferguson – bass
- Michael Mason – drums and percussion, background vocals
- Joe Galdo, Duane Hitchings – keyboards
- Rick Baron, Tommy Thayer, Sandy Slavin, Bobby Colomby, Robby Weaver, Jaime St. James, Carmine Appice – background vocals

Production

- Peter Solley – producer, engineer, mixing
- Michael Verdick – producer, engineer
- Jim Sessody – engineer
- Patrice Levinsohn – assistant engineer
- Doug Banker – executive producer, management, background vocals
- Dennis King – mastering
- Bob Defrin – art direction
- Eric Conn – 2001 edition digital remastering
- Gary Graff – 2001 edition liner notes

== Charts ==
| Chart (1986) | Peak position |
|---|---|
| Canada Top Albums/CDs (RPM) | 89 |
| Finnish Albums (The Official Finnish Charts) | 33 |
| US Billboard 200 | 76 |
