= Alive Again =

Alive Again may refer to:

- "Alive Again" (Chicago song), 1978
- "Alive Again" (Cher song), 2002
- "Alive Again" (Lights song), 2024
- Alive Again (Nightingale album), 2003
- Alive Again (Nuclear Assault album), 2003
- Alive Again (Matt Maher album), 2009
- Alive Again (The Neal Morse Band album), 2016

== See also ==
- Live Again (disambiguation)
