= In My Dreams (REO Speedwagon song) =

Single by REO Speedwagon

from the album Life as We Know It
- B-side: "Over the Edge"
- Released: July 1987 (US)
- Recorded: December 1986
- Genre: Rock
- Length: 4:31 (album version); 4:20 (7" single/video version)
- Label: Epic
- Songwriters: Kevin Cronin, Tom Kelly
- Producers: Kevin Cronin, Gary Richrath, Alan Gratzer, David DeVore

REO Speedwagon singles chronology
"Variety Tonight" (1987)	"In My Dreams" (1987)	"Here with Me" (1988)

"In My Dreams" is a song by American rock band REO Speedwagon, from their twelfth studio album Life as We Know It. Released as the third single from the album, the song was a top 20 hit in the U.S., where it peaked at No. 19 on the Billboard Hot 100 in October 1987. It also peaked at No. 6 on the Adult Contemporary chart. In Canada, it reached a peak of No. 61.

Cash Box called it a "sentimental and romantic spin [that] should connect with AC and CHR."

== Track listing ==
US/Canada/Europe 7" single
A. "In My Dreams" - 4:20
B. "Over the Edge" - 3:56
