= R.E.O. Speedwagon (album) =

Studio album by REO Speedwagon
- Released: October 1971
- Recorded: 1970–1971
- Studios: Connecticut Recording Studios Inc. "Prison Women" recorded at Columbia Recording Studios in Chicago, Illinois
- Length: 38:10
- Label: Epic
- Producers: Paul Leka, Billy Rose II

REO Speedwagon chronology
R.E.O. Speedwagon (1971)	R.E.O./T.W.O. (1972)

Singles from R.E.O. Speedwagon
- 1. "Sophisticated Lady" Released: 1971

Professional ratings
Review scores
Source	Rating
AllMusic	3/5 stars

R.E.O. Speedwagon is the debut studio album by American rock band REO Speedwagon. Released in 1971, it was the only album recorded with singer Terry Luttrell, who would go on to join Starcastle. Kevin Cronin joined the band for R.E.O./T.W.O. This album concluded with a progressive rock song unlike the later arena rock songs that made them famous.

The album produced the fan favorites “157 Riverside Avenue”, “Sophisticated Lady” and “Lay Me Down”, but sold poorly, though “Sophisticated Lady” did reach number 122 on the singles charts. “157 Riverside Avenue” and “Lay Me Down” were subsequently recorded on the live album Live: You Get What You Play For. “157 Riverside Avenue” and “Sophisticated Lady” were both featured on the compilation album A Decade of Rock and Roll: 1970-1980. In 2007, the British company BGO Records released REO Speedwagon and R.E.O./T.W.O. together (BGOCD775), marking the first time the band's first album was widely available in CD format.

Record World called the single "Sophisticated Lady" "ultra-energy music of the sort that enlivens top 40 formats."

== Track listing ==
All songs written by Neal Doughty, Alan Gratzer, Terry Luttrell, Gregg Philbin, and Gary Richrath.

Side one

1. "Gypsy Woman's Passion" – 5:17
2. "157 Riverside Avenue" – 3:57
3. "Anti-Establishment Man" – 5:21
4. "Lay Me Down" – 3:51

Side two

5. "Sophisticated Lady" – 4:00
6. "Five Men Were Killed Today" – 3:00
7. "Prison Women" – 2:36
8. "Dead at Last" – 10:08

== Personnel ==
REO Speedwagon

- Terry Luttrell - lead vocals
- Gary Richrath - guitar
- Neal Doughty - keyboards
- Gregg Philbin - bass, backing vocals
- Alan Gratzer - drums, backing vocals

Additional personnel

- Andre Borly - organ (track 6)
- Freedom Soul Singers - backing vocals (track 8)

== Charts ==
Singles - Billboard (United States)

Year	Single	Chart	Position
1972	"Sophisticated Lady"	Bubbling Under the Hot 100	122

== Release history ==
Region	Date	Title	Label	Format	Catalog #
USA	October 1971	R.E.O. Speedwagon	Epic Records	Stereo Vinyl	E-31089
USA	1971	R.E.O. Speedwagon	Epic Records	8 Track	ET-31089
UK	1993	R.E.O. Speedwagon	Epic Records	CD	9829672
UK	2007	R.E.O. Speedwagon / R.E.O./T.W.O.	BGO Records	2-CD (Digitally re-mastered)	BGOCD775
Japan	2011	R.E.O. Speedwagon	Sony Music	CD (DSD-Remaster)	EICP 1480
Germany	2013	R.E.O. Speedwagon	Yellow Label	(Coloured) Vinyl	SPV 265961 LP
