= The Earth, a Small Man, His Dog and a Chicken =

- Original album artwork by Mark Ryden

Studio album by REO Speedwagon
- Released: July 30, 1990
- Recorded: September 3, 1989 – May 31, 1990
- Studios: Ocean Way Recording (Hollywood, California); One On One Studios (North Hollywood, California); Encore Studios (Burbank, California)
- Genre: Rock
- Length: 46:26
- Label: Epic
- Producers: Kevin Cronin, Jesse Harms, Tom Lord-Alge, Jim Scott

REO Speedwagon chronology
The Hits (1988)	The Earth, a Small Man, His Dog and a Chicken (1990)	Building the Bridge (1996)

Professional ratings
Review scores
Source	Rating
Entertainment Weekly	C+
The Rolling Stone Album Guide	1/5 stars
Select	2/5 medals

The Earth, a Small Man, His Dog and a Chicken is the thirteenth studio album by REO Speedwagon, and was released in 1990.

It marked the end of their contract with Epic Records and is, to date, the last REO album to chart, peaking at No. 129 on the Billboard 200. The song "Love Is a Rock" reached No. 65 on Billboard's Hot 100 (their last entry to date), and "Live It Up" reached No. 6 on Billboard's Hot Mainstream Rock Tracks. "Go For Broke" was written for the film Days of Thunder but ultimately not used.

The album's title was taken directly from the cover illustration by Mark Ryden, as bassist Bruce Hall explained:

""We were looking for album covers and we had this artist who was drawing pictures... One of them he showed us was that one, and he simply called it 'The Earth, a Small Man, His Dog and a Chicken.' He was thinking that we would change it to something else, but we’ve always been interested in funny or different kind of album titles, like You Can Tune a Piano, But You Can't Tuna Fish — that kind of stuff. For some reason Kevin thought it was hilarious, and I’m going, 'I’m not too sure about that.' But he kind of won me over. It was kind of funny. So we put it out there."

Following the departure of two long-time members, guitarist and songwriter Gary Richrath and drummer Alan Gratzer, more than half of the songs on this album were written or co-written by keyboardist Jesse Harms. It is also the first album to include guitarist Dave Amato and drummer Bryan Hitt who remained with the band until their 2024 breakup, and currently tour with classic-era and longtime lead vocalist Kevin Cronin.

== Track listing ==
Side one
No.	Title	Writer(s)	Length
1.	"Love Is a Rock"	Kevin Cronin	5:36
2.	"The Heart Survives"	Cronin, Jesse Harms	4:50
3.	"Live It Up"	Harms	4:00
4.	"All Heaven Broke Loose"	Neal Doughty, Adrian Gurvitz, Harms	4:11
5.	"Love in the Future"	Cronin, Tom Kelly	4:32

Side two
No.	Title	Writer(s)	Length
6.	"Half Way"	Cronin, Harms, Mark Spiro	4:17
7.	"Love to Hate"	Harms	4:09
8.	"You Won't See Me"	Cronin	3:21
9.	"Can't Lie to My Heart"	Cronin, Diane Warren	4:40
10.	"L.I.A.R."	Dave Amato, Cronin, Doughty, Bruce Hall, Bryan Hitt	3:09
11.	"Go for Broke"	Amato, Cronin, Hall, Harms	3:28

== Personnel ==
REO Speedwagon

- Kevin Cronin – lead vocals, acoustic guitar
- Neal Doughty – Hammond organ
- Jesse Harms – keyboards, backing vocals
- Dave Amato – lead guitar, backing vocals
- Bruce Hall – bass
- Bryan Hitt – drums, percussion

Additional performers

- Steve Forman – percussion
- Debra Dobkin – backing vocals
- Beth Hooker – backing vocals
- Darlene Koldenhoven – backing vocals
- Janis Liebhart – backing vocals
- Andrea Robinson – backing vocals
- Machan Taylor – backing vocals
- Terry Wood – backing vocals

== Production ==
- Kevin Cronin – producer
- Jesse Harms – producer
- Tom Lord-Alge – producer, recording (3–11), mixing
- Jim Scott – producer (1, 2), recording (1, 2)
- Julie Last – assistant engineer (1, 2)
- Steve Gallagher – assistant engineer (3–11)
- Mike Tacci – assistant engineer (3–11)
- Ted Jensen – mastering at Sterling Sound (New York City, New York).
- David Coleman – art direction, design
- Mark Ryden – illustration
- Dennis Keeley – photography

== Charts ==
=== Album ===
Chart (1990)	Peak position
Swiss Albums (Schweizer Hitparade)	38
US Billboard 200	129

=== Singles ===
Year	Single	Chart	Position
1990	"Love Is a Rock"	US Billboard Hot 100	65
1990	"Love Is a Rock"	US Mainstream Rock	31
1990	"Love Is a Rock"	Japanese Singles Chart	53
1990	"Live It Up"	US Mainstream Rock	6
1990	"Live It Up"	Canadian RPM Singles Chart	81

== Release history ==
Region	Date	Label	Format	Catalog #
USA	August 1990	Epic Records	Stereo Vinyl	E-45246
USA	1990	Epic Records	Tape	ET-45246
USA	1990	Epic Records	CD	EK45246
