= Duke Tumatoe =

American blues guitarist and singer

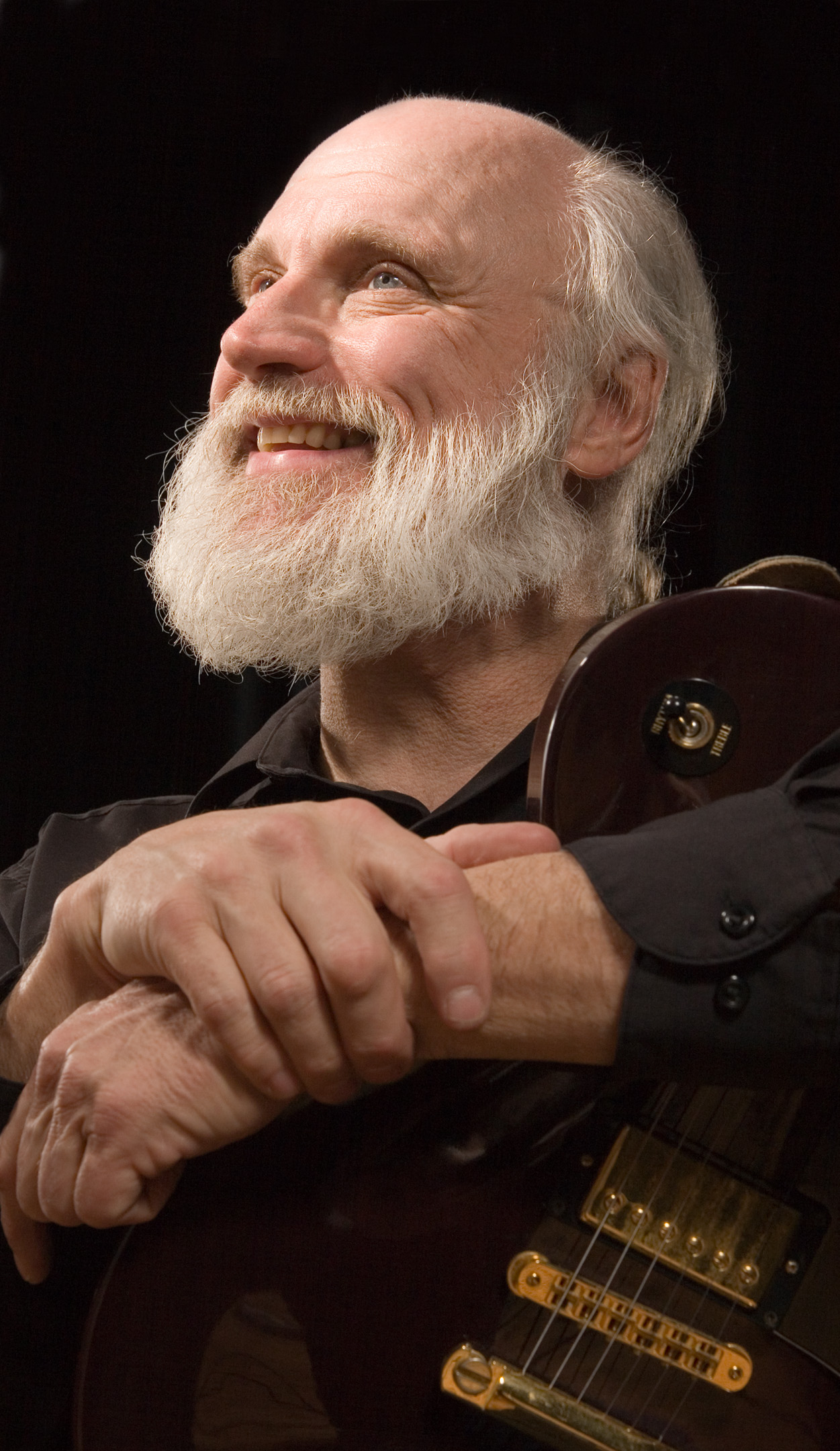

Background information
- Origin: Chicago, Illinois, U.S.
- Genres: Blues, rock, R&B, funk
- Years active: 1965–present
- Labels: Warner Bros. Records, Blind Pig, J-Bird, Sweetfinger Music
- Website: duketumatoe.com

Duke Tumatoe, born William “Bill" Severen Fiorio in 1947, is an American blues guitarist, vocalist and songwriter. He has performed with Muddy Waters, Bo Diddley, B.B. King, Willie Dixon, Buddy Guy, John Fogerty and George Thorogood. He was an early member of REO Speedwagon, a group that later became an arena-rock success. He has released fifteen albums as the bandleader of Duke Tumatoe and The All-Star Frogs and Duke Tumatoe and The Power Trio. His 1988 live album I Like My Job was produced by John Fogerty. He followed a rigorous tour schedule for most of his career, typically playing more than 200 dates per year.

== Early life ==
Duke Tumatoe was born in June 1947 in Chicago. His father was a first-generation Italian immigrant whose family hailed from San Bonifacio, Italy, a northern Italian town outside Verona. He grew up in Beverly, a neighborhood in southwestern Chicago.

The South Side is where Chicago blues originated, and it was an influence on Tumatoe. As a teen, he often visited the market at Maxwell Street to hear live blues. He said, "I first saw Muddy Waters when I was 13. We were hearing that stuff all the time and just assumed everybody was, too. I knew all the old guys, and I'd see them every day. I can't believe I took that for granted."

He learned to play drums at age 14 and guitar a year after that.

== Career ==
=== Lothar and the Hand People ===
In 1965, Tumatoe enrolled in the University of Illinois at Urbana-Champaign and founded the short-lived band Lothar and the Hand People, named by classmate Bill Geist.

=== REO Speedwagon ===
In 1967, while living in Champaign, Illinois, Tumatoe joined REO Speedwagon in their nascent stages, replacing Bob Crownover, alongside founding members Neal Doughty and Alan Gratzer. The band started as a soul band, inspired by Otis Redding, Sam and Dave and The Doors. In 1969, the band decided to take a more straightforward approach to rock and roll, so Tumatoe, who wanted to play blues music, left the group to pursue his own musical endeavors. Tumatoe said, "It became more and more obvious that we weren't meant to play together...they're really hard-working people. I have nothing but good things to say about them."

=== Duke Tumatoe and The All-Star Frogs ===
In 1969, Tumatoe founded Duke Tumatoe and The All-Star Frogs. The band featured guitar, bass, drums, harmonica and keyboards. They toured for thirteen years and released four albums (see discogs). The All-Star Frogs featured keyboardist James Mitchell Hill, whose playing has been compared to Booker T. Jones. Hill continues to play with Tumatoe through the present day.

=== Duke Tumatoe and The Power Trio ===
In 1983, Tumatoe disbanded The All-Star Frogs and formed The Power Trio. The new group consisted of guitar, bass, drums and keys, though certain lineup changes featured two guitarists and no keys. The Power Trio performed an average of 200 dates per year, and have released twelve albums to date.

=== John Fogerty and I Like My Job ===
In 1987, John Fogerty of Creedence Clearwater Revival undertook his own ethnomusicologist mission by traveling through the South and Midwestern United States to discover regional acts that could not be heard on radio. In Mishawaka, Indiana, Fogerty heard a radio advertisement for Duke Tumatoe. He attended the show that evening and was so impressed he returned on four consecutive evenings. "The first time I heard Duke it gave me chills," said Fogerty:

I hadn't experienced energy like that in a long time. It was like walking in on Jimmy Swaggart in his heyday. Everybody in the audience was shouting and screaming and having a good time. I mean the crowd was just eating out of this guy's hand. Immediately the light went on in my head—somebody ought to record these guys.

Fogerty then began producing records. He played a cassette of a live recording of Duke to Warner Bros. Records president Lenny Waronker and was approved to begin recording what would become the 1988 live album, I Like My Job. Determined to capture the live energy of the band, Fogerty assembled over 24 hours of live recordings before beginning the mixing process. Fogerty and engineer Alan Johnson spent three months mixing the record.

Of the mixing process, Fogerty said:

I'd take a piece of a song from one night and add pieces from other nights...a bridge here, a chorus there. I was looking to get as close to that feeling I had when I first saw him. At the same time, it was important to me that I didn't mess with the material itself. Duke is a great songwriter, and great song interpreter. I really wasn't able to tell which tunes were originals and which were covers and that's the way I liked it. This is his music, played his way. I just sort of assembled the best moments.

Capturing Tumatoe's crowd interaction was a concern. "That interaction was vital. Which is why you get a lot of call and response on the record. Duke is a very quick guy. And very funny. He knows how to work a crowd and it was my hope that the energy would come across on record."

=== “Lord Help Our Colts” ===
Shortly after moving to Indianapolis in the 1980s, Tumatoe befriended Tom Griswold of “The Bob & Tom Show,” a nationally syndicated radio program that fuses comedy and music. In 1985, Tumatoe was looking for a way to promote a local blues club called Uncle Slugs, and Griswold suggested he write a song about the city's new NFL team, the Indianapolis Colts, which had formerly been the Baltimore Colts. The result was the tongue-in-cheek “Lord Help Our Colts,” a catchy twelve-bar blues jingle with a static chorus and verses that could easily be updated to recap each game. “I, of course, wrote the song in a form that I thought if necessary, I could easily update, which turned out to be a real good thing, a smart move,” says Tumatoe. To date, he has sung more than 800 versions over the past thirty years.

Tumatoe performed the songs weekly on air, and though they were a hit with fans, some of the players and coaches took umbrage to his lyrics, especially when Tumatoe couldn't resist taking a dig. On a few different occasions, Tumatoe barely avoided physical altercations initiated by drunken quarterbacks or angry coaches. Says Tumatoe, “I think people miss a basic thing about the blues, and I don’t understand why they don’t get it. Blues is a light-hearted music. They’re stories that make fun of what goes on in your life. Don’t get me wrong, I’m a football fan. I enjoy these games. I watch them all. But the premise of all these guys getting millions and millions of dollars to play a kids’ game is in and of itself not serious. It's a cause to celebrate when they're winning, but it really doesn't affect your life other than it's nice when your team is doing well. And these guys are getting millions of dollars, and these guys are bitching about it when you criticize their performance? I didn't really criticize their performance. I just made it rhyme."

== Musical style ==
Tumatoe is a self-taught guitarist who learned to play by watching Chicago’s blues legends. His guitar playing has been described as “B.B. King played through Jimi Hendrix (with a touch of Andy Gill).”

Tumatoe’s songs are noted for their humor, something he explains as, "There are two elements of the blues. There's the general intensity of the music…and an element of humor, some twist in the lyrics. It's like a comedian turning something sad into something funny."

== Gear ==
Tumatoe's primary guitar is a 1957 Gibson Les Paul Jr. named “Albert,” an homage to Albert King, a blues legend with whom Tumatoe has performed.

== Personal life ==
Tumatoe has been married for 33 years and has six grown children. Says Tumatoe, “I’ve had a great life. If you get a chance the next time around, pick Duke Tumatoe. It’s a lot of fun."

== Discography ==
- Red Pepper Hot (Duke Tumatoe and the All-Star Frogs, 1976)
- Naughty Child (Duke Tumatoe and the All-Star Frogs, 1980)
- Back to Chicago (Duke Tumatoe and the All-Star Frogs, 1982)
- Dukes Up (1986)
- I Like My Job (live album produced by John Fogerty, 1988)
- Dr. Duke (1992)
- Wild Animals (1994)
- Greatest Hits Plus (1996)
- Picks & Sticks (instrumental, 1997)
- A Ejukatid Man (1999)
- Pompous and Overrated (2001)
- It's Christmas (Let's Have Sex) (2001)
- Big Bang (2002)
- You've Got The Problem (2006)
- I Just Want to be Rich (2010)
- How Much Crazy Can You Take (2017)
