= Live: You Get What You Play For =

Live album by REO Speedwagon
- Released: March 1977
- Recorded: February 23–24, September 5, October 30–31, and November 1, 1976
- Venue: Memorial Hall, Kansas City, KS; Convention Center, Indianapolis, IN; Kiel Auditorium, St. Louis, MO; Electric Ballroom, Atlanta, GA
- Genre: Rock
- Length: 77:47 (LP edition); 68:35 (CD edition); 80:34 (Two-CD edition)
- Label: Epic
- Producers: John Stronach, Gary Richrath, John Henning

REO Speedwagon chronology
R.E.O. (1976)	Live: You Get What You Play For (1977)	You Can Tune a Piano, but You Can't Tuna Fish (1978)

Professional ratings
Review scores
Source	Rating
Allmusic	3/5 stars

Live: You Get What You Play For is a live album by rock band REO Speedwagon, released as a double-LP in 1977 (and years later as a single CD omitting "Gary's Guitar Solo" and "Little Queenie"). It was recorded from February to November 1976 at Memorial Hall in Kansas City, Kansas, the Convention Center in Indianapolis, Indiana, the Kiel Auditorium in St. Louis, Missouri and the Electric Ballroom in Atlanta, Georgia. It peaked at number #72 on the Billboard 200 chart in 1977. The album went platinum on December 14, 1978.

This album's live version of the song "Ridin' the Storm Out" (an earlier studio version of this song appeared on the band's third album Ridin' the Storm Out) reached #94 on Billboard's Hot 100 chart, and has since become a classic rock radio staple. The song refers to the band being stuck in a harsh winter blizzard, after a show in Boulder, Colorado at a bar named Tulagi (now closed). The band had decided to prank its tour manager by intentionally getting lost, but then inadvertently became genuinely lost as a dangerous winter storm approached.

Producer John Stronach was fired by the band after his mix of this album "sounded like a studio album". The band then did its own mix of this album, which became their first album to sell over a million records. Afterward, the band continued to mix its own albums, all of which reached either gold or platinum sales results.

The Japanese CD reissue, released in 2011, restores the album and songs to its original full length by including both "Gary's Guitar Solo" and "Little Queenie", which were omitted in the original single CD release due to time constraints. Sony Music also released the unedited double LP Epic master on its Legacy Label for Compact Disc in 2011 as well.

== Track listing ==
All tracks are written by Gary Richrath, except where noted.

Side one
No.	Title	Writer(s)	Length
1.	"Like You Do"		6:43
2.	"Lay Me Down"	Richrath, Neal Doughty, Alan Gratzer, Terry Luttrell, Gregg Philbin	3:34
3.	"Any Kind of Love"		3:33
4.	"Being Kind"	Kevin Cronin	6:27

Side two
No.	Title	Writer(s)	Length
5.	"Keep Pushin'"	Cronin	3:59
6.	"(Only A) Summer Love"		6:06
7.	"Son of a Poor Man"		5:25
8.	"(I Believe) Our Time Is Gonna Come"	Cronin

Side three
No.	Title	Writer(s)	Length
9.	"Flying Turkey Trot"		2:34
10.	"Gary's Guitar Solo" (+)		6:10
11.	"157 Riverside Avenue"	Richrath, Doughty, Gratzer, Luttrell, Philbin	7:35
12.	"Ridin' the Storm Out"		5:34

Side four
No.	Title	Writer(s)	Length
13.	"Music Man"	Cronin	2:29
14.	"Little Queenie" (+)	Chuck Berry	4:45
15.	"Golden Country"		8:12
Total length:			77:18

(+) Appeared on the original double-LP release of the album, but omitted from the original single CD release. They are included on the 2011 Japanese "remaster" two-CD release.

== Personnel ==
=== REO Speedwagon ===
- Kevin Cronin – lead vocals (1–5, 7–15), rhythm guitar
- Gary Richrath – lead guitar, lead vocals (3, 6)
- Neal Doughty – keyboards
- Gregg Philbin – bass, backing vocals
- Alan Gratzer – drums, backing vocals

=== Technical ===
- Production – John Stronach, John Henning, Gary Richrath
- Engineering – John Stronach, John Henning, Bruce Hensal, Pete Carlson, Jack Crymes, Kelly Kotera, Rick Sanchez, Mike Klink
- Mixing – John Henning, Gary Richrath
- Illustration – Vartán Kurjian, Justin Carroll
- Design – Tom Steele
- Photography – Lorrie Sullivan

== Charts ==
Chart (1977)	Peak position
US Billboard 200	72

== Certifications ==
Region	Certification	Certified units/sales
United States (RIAA)	Platinum	1,000,000^{^}
^{^} Shipments figures based on certification alone.

== Release history ==
Region	Date	Label	Format	Catalog #
USA	March 1977	Epic Records	Stereo Vinyl	E-34494
USA	1977	Epic Records	Tape	EGT-34494
USA	1977	Epic Records	8 Track	E34494
UK	August 1977	Epic Records	Stereo Vinyl	
USA	1988	Epic Records	CD	EK34494
Japan	2011	Sony Music	2-CD (DSD-Remaster)	EICP 1486-7
