= Building the Bridge =

Studio album by REO Speedwagon
- Released: July 9, 1996
- Recorded: 1995–96
- Genre: Rock
- Length: 48:42
- Label: Castle Records / Rhythm Safari
- Producer: Kevin Cronin, Greg Ladanyi

REO Speedwagon chronology
The Earth, a Small Man, His Dog and a Chicken (1990)	Building the Bridge (1996)	Find Your Own Way Home (2007)

Building the Bridge is the fourteenth studio album by REO Speedwagon. It became the group's first non-charting album since 1972's R.E.O./T.W.O.. This is the only studio album by the band not in the ITunes Store, though the title track is available on The Essential REO Speedwagon. The album was re-released on May 27, 2022, on Jimmy Buffett's Mailboat Records on CD, LP and digital.

The song "Building The Bridge" found its way to the White House, where President Clinton adopted it as the theme for his re-election campaign in 1996.

Professional ratings
Review scores
Source	Rating
Allmusic	link

== Track listing ==
No.	Title	Writer(s)	Length
1.	"Can't Stop Rockin'"	Dave Amato, Kevin Cronin, Bruce Hall	3:52
2.	"I Still Love You"	Cronin, Stephen Stills	4:12
3.	"Building the Bridge"	Cronin	4:43
4.	"When I Get Home"	Cronin	4:34
5.	"Then I Met You"	Cronin	4:53
6.	"Look the Other Way"	Cronin	3:29
7.	"After Tonight"	Hall	4:44
8.	"Hey Wait a Minute"	Hall	5:21
9.	"One True Man"	Cronin	4:42
10.	"She's Gonna Love Me"	Amato, Cronin	4:02
11.	"Ballad of the Illinois Opry"	Cronin	4:10

== Personnel ==
REO Speedwagon

- Kevin Cronin – lead vocals (1–7, 9–11), backing vocals, acoustic guitar, electric guitar, rhythm guitar
- Dave Amato – lead guitar, rhythm guitar, slide guitar, backing vocals, harmony vocals
- Neal Doughty – keyboards
- Bruce Hall – bass, acoustic guitar, backing vocals, lead vocals (8)
- Bryan Hitt – drums, percussion

Additional musicians

- Stephen Croes – Synclavier, orchestrations, string arrangements
- Mitch Zelezny – sequencing
- Luis Conte – percussion
- Dan Higgins – saxophones
- Lew McCreary – trombone
- Jerry Hey – trumpet
- Carmen Twillie – backing vocals
- Julia Waters – backing vocals
- Maxine Waters Willard – backing vocals

== Production ==
- Kevin Cronin – producer, engineer, liner notes
- Greg Ladanyl – producer, engineer, mixing
- Stephen Croes – co-producer (5)
- Paris X – engineer
- Brett Swain – engineer
- Jeffrey Shannon – additional engineer, assistant engineer
- Ron Lewter – mastering
- Gavin Lurssen – mastering
- Doug Sax – mastering
- Tim Wilson – technical advisor
- Bobby Oberdorsten – guitar technician
- Brian Ranks – guitar technician
- Danny Shuss – drum technician, guitar technician
- Terry Wieland – guitar technician
- Omar Abderahman – production coordinator
- Debbie Sommer – production coordinator
- Martin Bambanian – art direction
- George Abe – cover artwork
- Breeze Munson – photography
