= Levon (band) =

American country band

- Origin: Franklin, Tennessee, United States
- Genres: Country
- Years active: 2014–present
- Labels: Columbia Nashville, Epic
- Members: Michael David Hall, Jake Singleton, Ryan Holladay
- Website: www.levonthemusic.com

LEVON (also stylized as levonthemusic) is an American country music trio based in Nashville, Tennessee. The band consists of Michael David Hall (lead vocals, guitar), Jake Singleton (harmonies, bass, percussion), and Ryan Holladay (guitar, mandolin, harmonies). The trio blends the genres of americana, festival rock, and 1970s country rock to create their signature sound.

== History ==
Origins & Formation:

LEVON was formed in Franklin, Tennessee, in 2014. Michael David Hall, originally from Northbrook, Illinois, was working as a server at a restaurant that featured live music, where his band was scheduled to perform. Jake Singleton, from Sumter, South Carolina, was playing in another band on the same bill that evening. Impressed by each other’s performances, Hall and Singleton began writing songs together and developing vocal harmonies, with Singleton switching from drums, his original instrument, to bass.

In 2015, the pair met Ryan Holladay, a native of Camden, Tennessee, and an experienced bluegrass musician whose voice complemented their blend. The trio soon formed LEVON, a name inspired by Levon Helm of The Band and the Elton John song “Levon.”

After relocating to Nashville, Tennessee, LEVON began performing regularly at local venues and occasionally busking in the streets, often near the entrance to The Pancake Pantry. As their reputation grew, the group opened for artists including Willie Nelson, Lady A, and Florida Georgia Line. LEVON subsequently signed with Columbia Nashville, releasing their self-titled debut EP in May 2017.

Their debut EP, Levon EP, was released on May 12, 2017, "Ms. Marianne" is the lead single.

In June, 2017, they were mentioned in the Tennessee Journal’s Top 5 Artists to watch at CMA fest. Video for “Ms. Marianne” premiered on People.com on July 31, 2017. The song was placed on Sounds Like Nashville’s 10 songs to listen to in September 2017.

Levon debuted on the Grand Ole Opry on June 30, 2018. In January 2019 Levon parted ways with Sony Music Nashville.

During the spring of 2018, Levon began performing with Kyle Egart on drums.

The band was the opening act for REO Speedwagon from 2021–2023. They were also heavily involved in the REO Speedwagon legacy show in Champaign, Illinois on June 14, 2025.

== Discography ==
- Levon - EP (2017)
- The Barefoot EP (2024)
