= Not So Silent Night ... Christmas with REO Speedwagon =

Studio album by REO Speedwagon
- Released: November 3, 2009
- Genre: Pop rock, Christmas
- Length: 45:55
- Label: Sony/Legacy; Speedwagon
- Producer: Joe Vannelli

REO Speedwagon chronology
Find Your Own Way Home (2007)	Not So Silent Night ... Christmas with REO Speedwagon (2009)

Not So Silent Night ... Christmas with REO Speedwagon is the sixteenth and final studio album by REO Speedwagon. It was released on November 3, 2009 by Sony Music, two years after the band's previous studio album, Find Your Own Way Home.

On July 1, 2010, the album was re-released with three bonus tracks, and a DVD was released in a series from Sony Music called The Yule Log DVD, in which the music from "Not So Silent Night ... Christmas with REO Speedwagon" is featured with three different holiday visuals (one of them the yule log of the series' title). The original CD cover is featured on the DVD menu.

In 2017, the album was re-released again. On this release, "We Three Kings" was added as the 17th song on the album. There was also an insert contained inside the CD which allowed the owner to download a third version of "I Believe in Santa Claus." A music video of the song was released on YouTube. An LP of the album was also released.

Professional ratings
Review scores
Source	Rating
Allmusic	link

== Track listing ==
No.	Title	Writer(s)	Length
1.	"The First Noel"	Traditional	0:58
2.	"Winter Wonderland"	Felix Bernard, Dick Smith	3:02
3.	"Silent Night"	Joseph Mohr, Franz Gruber	3:42
4.	"Deck the Halls"	Traditional	3:24
5.	"Little Drummer Boy"	Katherine Davis, Henry Onorati, Harry Simeone	3:49
6.	"The White Snows of Winter"	Bob Shane, Tom Drake, Brahms	2:56
7.	"Angels We Have Heard on High (Gloria)"	Traditional	4:16
8.	"Children Go Where I Send Thee"	Traditional	4:03
9.	"I'll Be Home for Christmas"	Kim Gannon, Walter Kent	3:46
10.	"God Rest Ye, Merry Gentlemen"	Traditional	3:51
11.	"Happy Xmas (War Is Over)"	John Lennon, Yoko Ono	4:22
12.	"Blue Christmas"	Billy Hayes, Jay Johnson	3:57
13.	"Joy to the World"	Isaac Watts, George Frederick Handel	3:43

2010 bonus tracks
No.	Title	Writer(s)	Length
14.	"Sleigh Ride"	Leroy Anderson, Mitchell Parish	3:48
15.	"Hark! The Herald Angels Sing"	Felix Mendelssohn, Charles Wesley	4:13
16.	"I Believe in Santa Claus"	Kevin Cronin, Bruce Hall	2:45
Total length:			56:42

iTunes bonus track / 2017 CD bonus track
No.	Title	Writer(s)	Length
1.	"We Three Kings" (single)	John Henry Hopkins, Jr.	3:21

== Personnel ==
REO Speedwagon

- Kevin Cronin – acoustic guitar, lead vocals (1–11, 13–16), backing vocals, arrangements (1–8, 10, 13, 15), vocal arrangements
- Dave Amato – lead guitars, backing vocals
- Neal Doughty – keyboards
- Bruce Hall – bass, backing vocals, lead vocals (12)
- Bryan Hitt – drums, percussion

Additional performers

- Joe Vannelli – keyboards, orchestrations, arrangements (1–8, 10, 13, 15), vocal arrangements
- Dave Pearlman – pedal steel guitar (12)
- Mark Goldenberg – acoustic guitar (16)
- Perri (Carol Perry, Darlene Perry, Lori Perry and Sharon Perry) – backing vocals
- Holly Cronin – backing vocals (16)

Production

- Joe Vannelli – producer, engineer, mixing
- Kevin Cronin – associate producer
- Jeremy Duche – assistant engineer
- Meat and Potatoes, Inc. – art direction, design

== Release history ==
Region	Date	Label	Format	Catalog #
USA	November 3, 2009	Sony Music; Speedwagon	CD	A7606627
USA	July 1, 2010	Sony/Legacy; Speedwagon	CD (bonus tracks)	A774367
USA	2010	Sony/Legacy; Speedwagon	DVD	88697 77359 9
