= Ridin' the Storm Out =

Studio album by REO Speedwagon
- Released: December 21, 1973
- Recorded: Summer 1973
- Studios: Wally Heider Studios (Los Angeles); The Record Plant (Los Angeles)
- Genres: Hard rock, blues rock
- Length: 36:26
- Label: Epic
- Producer: Bill Halverson

REO Speedwagon chronology
R.E.O./T.W.O. (1972)	Ridin' the Storm Out (1973)	Lost in a Dream (1974)

Singles from Ridin' the Storm Out
- 1. "Ridin' the Storm Out" Released: February 1974

Professional ratings
Review scores
Source	Rating
Allmusic	4/5 stars

Ridin' the Storm Out is the third studio album by REO Speedwagon, released in 1973. It peaked at number 171 on the Billboard 200 chart in 1981, and reached platinum status in 1989. It was the first album to feature Mike Murphy on vocals. The sessions started out with Kevin Cronin, and the entire album's vocals were tracked, but he was soon ousted due to creative differences and his vocals were erased.

The title track would later become a #94 US hit for the band on their live album Live: You Get What You Play For, after Cronin had returned to the band. The song refers to the band being stuck in a harsh winter blizzard, after a show in Boulder, Colorado at a bar named Tulagi (now closed). The band had decided to prank its tour manager by intentionally getting lost, but then inadvertently became genuinely lost as a dangerous winter storm approached.

The album includes a new composition by Stephen Stills, "Open Up", which was never recorded by Stills himself or any of his bands, although "Know You Got to Run" from Stephen Stills 2 is essentially an embryonic version of the song. "Know You Got to Run" consists of only verses and uses a sombre acoustic folk arrangement, while "Open Up" includes a chorus and uses an up-tempo rock arrangement.

Cronin's original version of "Son of a Poor Man" is featured on the compilation albums A Decade of Rock and Roll: 1970-1980, and The Essential REO Speedwagon. "Son of a Poor Man" and "Ridin' the Storm Out" were featured on the live album Live: You Get What You Play For. The studio version of "Ridin' the Storm Out" with Cronin on vocals was released on the compilation "Box Set Series" in 2014, "The Early Years 1971-1977" boxed set in 2018 and as a downloadable track in the music video game Rock Band.

Record World said of the title track that it has "a good mix of hard rock guitar sounds and harmony vocals."

== Track listing ==
Side one
No.	Title	Writer(s)	Length
1.	"Ridin' the Storm Out"	Gary Richrath	4:12
2.	"Whiskey Night"	Richrath	4:42
3.	"Oh Woman"	Richrath	2:46
4.	"Find My Fortune"	Richrath	2:53
5.	"Open Up"	Stephen Stills	3:31

Side two
No.	Title	Writer(s)	Length
6.	"Movin'"	Kevin Cronin	3:20
7.	"Son of a Poor Man"	Richrath	3:44
8.	"Start a New Life"	Richrath	3:50
9.	"It's Everywhere"	Cronin	3:26
10.	"Without Expression (Don't Be the Man)"	Terry Reid	3:51

== Personnel ==
REO Speedwagon

- Mike Murphy – lead vocals
- Gary Richrath – guitar, lead vocal on "Find My Fortune"
- Neal Doughty – keyboards
- Gregg Philbin – bass
- Alan Gratzer – drums

Additional personnel

- Gene Estes – percussion
- Guille Garcia – percussion
- Joe Walsh – slide guitar on "Whiskey Night", "Open Up" and "Start a New Life"
- Gloria Jones – backing vocals
- Carolyn Willis – backing vocals
- Oma Drake – backing vocals

== Charts ==
Chart (1974)	Peak position
US Billboard 200	171

== Certifications ==
Region	Certification	Certified units/sales
United States (RIAA)	Platinum	1,000,000^{^}
^{^} Shipments figures based on certification alone.

== Release history ==
Region	Date	Title	Label	Format	Catalog #
USA	December 1973	Ridin' the Storm Out	Epic Records	Stereo Vinyl	E-32378
USA	1973	Ridin' the Storm Out	Epic Records	Tape	PET-32378
USA	1973	Ridin' the Storm Out	Epic Records	8 TRK	E32378
USA	1986	Ridin' the Storm Out	Epic Records	CD	EK32378
UK	2008	Ridin' the Storm Out / Lost in a Dream	BGO Records	CD (Digitally re-mastered)	BGOCD805
Japan	2011	Ridin' the Storm Out	Sony Music	CD (DSD-Remaster)	EICP 1482
