= Nine Lives (REO Speedwagon album) =

Studio album by REO Speedwagon
- Released: July 20, 1979
- Recorded: Spring 1979
- Studios: Sound City (Studio A) (Los Angeles); Kendun (Studio D) (Burbank)
- Genre: Rock
- Length: 34:24
- Label: Epic
- Producers: Kevin Cronin, Gary Richrath, Kevin Beamish

REO Speedwagon chronology
You Can Tune a Piano But You Can't Tuna Fish (1978)	Nine Lives (1979)	Hi Infidelity (1980)

Nine Lives is the eighth studio album by REO Speedwagon. It peaked at number No. 33 on the Billboard 200 chart in 1979. The album went gold on December 5, 1979. The title Nine Lives was chosen because the album was the band's ninth, including their live album, and it also featured nine songs. It was the last REO album to prominently feature a more hard rock sound. The group would turn to more pop-oriented material with 1980's Hi Infidelity. In 2013, the album was released on CD by UK-based company Rock Candy Records, with expanded liner notes and photos.

The track "Only the Strong Survive" also later appeared on Gary Richrath's 1992 album Only the Strong Survive.

== Critical reception ==
Professional ratings
Review scores
Source	Rating
AllMusic	3/5 stars
The Encyclopedia of Popular Music	2/5 stars
Melodic	4/5 stars
MusicHound Rock: The Essential Album Guide	2.5/5 stars
Record Mirror	4/5 stars
The Rolling Stone Album Guide	2/5 stars

The Globe and Mail wrote that "Nine Lives doesn't offer anything that hasn't already been done to death on the other eight... A little boogie-woogie piano, a few guitar solos that never quite get off the ground, some screeched vocals—it all adds up to a half-hour of competence with very little originality."

Record World said of the single "Easy Money" that "the verse builds into a roaring chorus that's an AOR standard." The magazine said of the single release of "Only the Strong Survive" that it "rips and roars with typical REO flash."

== Track listing ==
Side one
No.	Title	Writer(s)	Length
1.	"Heavy on Your Love"	Kevin Cronin, Gary Richrath	3:35
2.	"Drop It (An Old Disguise)"	Cronin	3:14
3.	"Only the Strong Survive"	Richrath	3:52
4.	"Easy Money"	Richrath	4:01
5.	"Rock & Roll Music"	Chuck Berry	2:55

Side two
No.	Title	Writer(s)	Length
1.	"Take Me"	Cronin	3:29
2.	"I Need You Tonight"	Cronin	3:35
3.	"Meet Me on the Mountain"	Richrath	4:04
4.	"Back on the Road Again"	Bruce Hall	5:39

== Personnel ==
REO Speedwagon

- Kevin Cronin – lead vocals, rhythm guitar
- Gary Richrath – lead guitar
- Neal Doughty – keyboards
- Bruce Hall – bass, backing vocals (lead on track 9)
- Alan Gratzer – drums, backing vocals

Additional personnel

- Bill Champlin – backing vocals
- Steve Forman – percussion
- Tom Kelly – backing vocals

Production

- Producers: Kevin Cronin, Gary Richrath, Kevin Beamish
- Engineers: Kevin Beamish, Gary Lubow
- Arranger: Kevin Cronin
- Associate producer: Alan Gratzer
- Production assistance: Gary Lubow
- Assistant engineers: Steve Williams, D. C. Snyder
- Direction: John Baruck, Alex Kochan, Tom Consolo, JoAnn D'Agostino, Lynne Kirkwood
- Art direction: Tom Drennon
- Design: Tom Drennon, Ginger Canzoneri
- Cover photographer: John Bilecky
- Center spread and portrait photography: Neal Preston
- Back cover cat illustrations: Ginger Canzoneri
- Models: Candy Moore, Lindy Thorp, Shyanne Rippee, Karen Bilecky

== Charts ==
Chart (1979)	Peak position
Canada Top Albums/CDs (RPM)	52
US Billboard 200	33

== Certifications ==
Region	Certification	Certified units/sales
United States (RIAA)	Gold	500,000^{^}
^{^} Shipments figures based on certification alone.

== Release history ==
Region	Date	Label	Format	Catalog #
USA	July 20, 1979	Epic	Stereo Vinyl	E-35988
USA	1979	Epic	Tape	PET-35988
USA	1979	Epic	8 TRK	E35988
USA	1990	Epic	CD	EK35988
Japan	2011	Sony	CD (DSD-Remaster)	EICP 1489
UK	2013	Rock Candy	CD-24 bit audio (Remastered & Reloaded)	CANDY177
