= Lost in a Dream (REO Speedwagon album) =

Studio album by REO Speedwagon
- Released: October 1974
- Recorded: 1974
- Studios: Wally Heider Studios (Los Angeles); The Record Plant (Sausalito)
- Genres: Hard rock, blues rock
- Length: 39:13
- Label: Epic
- Producer: Bill Halverson

REO Speedwagon chronology
Ridin' the Storm Out (1973)	Lost in a Dream (1974)	This Time We Mean It (1975)

Singles from Lost in a Dream
- 1. "Give Me a Ride (Roller Coaster)" Released: 1975

Lost in a Dream is the fourth studio album by REO Speedwagon, released in 1974. It peaked at number 98 on the Billboard 200 chart in 1975, It was the second album to feature Mike Murphy on vocals. The title track was written by Murphy and future bassist Bruce Hall, who would join the band in 1978. The title track was featured on the compilation A Decade of Rock and Roll: 1970-1980. The album was in print on CD format in 1992 for two months before being quickly deleted.

Professional ratings
Review scores
Source	Rating
Allmusic	2/5 stars

== Track listing ==
Side one
No.	Title	Writer(s)	Length
1.	"Give Me a Ride (Roller Coaster)"	Mike Murphy	3:48
2.	"Throw the Chains Away"	Gary Richrath	2:23
3.	"Sky Blues"	Neal Doughty	3:19
4.	"You Can Fly"	Murphy	4:14
5.	"Lost in a Dream"	Bruce Hall, Murphy	6:32

Side two
No.	Title	Writer(s)	Length
6.	"Down by the Dam"	Richrath	4:36
7.	"Do Your Best"	Murphy	3:22
8.	"Wild as the Western Wind"	Richrath	4:03
9.	"They're on the Road"	Richrath	3:40
10.	"I'm Feeling Good"	Doughty, Murphy	3:04

== Personnel ==
REO Speedwagon

- Mike Murphy – lead vocals
- Gary Richrath – guitar, lead vocals on "Wild as the Western Wind"
- Neal Doughty – keyboards
- Gregg Philbin – bass, backing vocals
- Alan Gratzer – drums, backing vocals

Other

- Sly Stone – bass, piano, guitar on "You Can Fly"

Technical

- Mike D. Stone – engineer
- Jimmy Wachtel – album design
- Lorrie Sullivan – photography

"Special thanks to Chris Stone and Gary Kellgren. Thanks a lot to: Irv Azoff, John Baruck, C. B. and Abe, Turkey (John) Durkin (Ace pilot and general good guy), Roger Douglas Marcum (Stain), Michael Anglin, Mick Joyce, Andy Green (The Grouch), Jody Boyer, Pat Craven, Pate Deters, Bub Phillipe, Karen Douglas, Lick, Kracker, Al, Joe Walsh and Barnstorm, The Doobie Brothers, Tony and the Toucholes, Terry Bassett, Don Ellis, Ron Alexenburg, Michael Sunday, Lee Trippett, Artie Patsiner and Tom Ross, St. Louis, Kansas City and Indianapolis."

== Charts ==
Chart (1975)	Peak position
US Billboard 200	98

== Release history ==
Region	Date	Title	Label	Format	Catalog #
USA	October 1974	Lost in a Dream	Epic Records	Stereo Vinyl	E-32948
USA	1974	Lost in a Dream	Epic Records	Tape	PET-32948
USA	1974	Lost in a Dream	Epic Records	8 Track	E32948
USA	1974	Lost in a Dream	Epic Records	Quadraphonic Vinyl	PEQ 32948
USA	1992	Lost in a Dream	Epic Records	CD	EK32948
UK	2008	Ridin' the Storm Out / Lost in a Dream	BGO Records	CD (Digitally re-mastered)	BGOCD805
Japan	2011	Lost in a Dream	Sony Music	CD (DSD-Remaster)	EICP 1483
