= R.E.O./T.W.O. =

Studio album by REO Speedwagon
- Released: December 1972
- Recorded: Summer 1972
- Studios: Columbia Studios, Nashville, Tennessee
- Genres: Rock, hard rock
- Length: 43:48
- Label: Epic
- Producers: Paul Leka, Billy Rose II

REO Speedwagon chronology
R.E.O. Speedwagon (1971)	R.E.O./T.W.O. (1972)	Ridin' the Storm Out (1973)

Professional ratings
Review scores
Source	Rating
Allmusic	2.5/5 stars

R.E.O./T.W.O. is the second studio album released by the Illinois-based rock band REO Speedwagon, released in 1972. Under the leadership of guitarist Gary Richrath, this album continued the musical direction set on 1971's REO Speedwagon with Richrath's own compositions carrying the record.

R.E.O./T.W.O. launched REO on its first national tour and presented a more polished production than the band‘s debut album; however, it still retained the progressive rock leanings that they were to ditch following the arrival of Mike Murphy and did not even have a slightly successful single to rival “Sophisticated Lady”. Despite this and R.E.O./T.W.O.’s failure to dent the Billboard Top 200, it has remained more readily available than the debut. The album went gold on August 13, 1981.

The album introduced Kevin Cronin as vocalist, guitarist and contributing songwriter to the band, replacing Terry Luttrell. Notable tracks on the album include Richrath’s political “Golden Country” as well as "Like You Do". Both songs, as well as Cronin’s “Music Man”, are frequently part of the band's setlist.

Former lead singer Luttrell claims to have co-written "Golden Country" with Richrath prior to departing the group, though no other members have commented on the matter and Luttrell remains uncredited as of 2026.

== Track listing ==
All songs written by Gary Richrath, except where noted.

Side one

1. "Let Me Ride" (Kevin Cronin) – 6:00
2. "How the Story Goes" – 3:34
3. "Little Queenie" (Chuck Berry) – 6:39
4. "Being Kind (Can Hurt Someone Sometimes)" (Cronin) – 6:02

Side two

1. "Music Man" (Cronin) – 4:38
2. "Like You Do" – 5:57
3. "Flash Tan Queen" – 4:23
4. "Golden Country" – 6:33

== Personnel ==
REO Speedwagon

- Kevin Cronin – lead and backing vocals, rhythm guitar
- Gary Richrath – lead guitar
- Neal Doughty – keyboards
- Gregg Philbin – bass
- Alan Gratzer – drums

Additional personnel

- Boots Randolph – saxophone (track 3)
- Kelly Bowen – backing vocals (track 1)
- Tomi Lee Bradly – backing vocals (track 1)

== Certifications ==
Region	Certification	Certified units/sales
United States (RIAA)	Gold	500,000^{^}
^{^} Shipments figures based on certification alone.

== Release history ==
Region	Date	Title	Label	Format	Catalog #
USA	December 1972	R.E.O./T.W.O.	Epic Records	Stereo Vinyl	E-31745
USA	1972	R.E.O./T.W.O.	Epic Records	Tape	PET-31745
USA	1972	R.E.O./T.W.O.	Epic Records	8 TRK	E31745
USA	1990	R.E.O./T.W.O.	Epic Records	CD	EK 31745
UK	2007	R.E.O. Speedwagon / R.E.O./T.W.O.	BGO Records	2-CD (Digitally re-mastered)	BGOCD775
Japan	2011	R.E.O./T.W.O.	Sony Music	CD (DSD-Remaster)	EICP 1481
Germany	2013	R.E.O./T.W.O.	Yellow Label	(Coloured) Vinyl	SPV 266141 LP
