= Find Your Own Way Home =

Studio album by REO Speedwagon
- Released: April 3, 2007
- Recorded: 2005–06
- Studio: Blue Moon Studio, Agoura Hills, CA
- Genre: Rock, hard rock
- Length: 43:55
- Label: Mailboat; Speedwagon
- Producer: Joe Vannelli, Kevin Cronin

REO Speedwagon chronology
Building the Bridge (1996)	Find Your Own Way Home (2007)	Not So Silent Night ... Christmas with REO Speedwagon (2009)

Find Your Own Way Home is the fifteenth studio album by REO Speedwagon. It was produced by Joe Vannelli and Kevin Cronin and was released in 2007 by Speedwagon Recordings and Mailboat Records. The album came eleven years after the band's previous studio album, Building the Bridge, and was their last full album of original material. The album found the band returning to its trademark hard rock sound after the soft ballads of Bridge. Though the album did not chart, it did produce the minor hit "I Needed to Fall", which peaked at #25 on the Billboard Adult Contemporary chart. "Smilin' in the End" was released at the same time as "I Needed to Fall" to classic rock stations, but did not chart. The third single from the album, the title track, reached #23 on the Billboard Adult Contemporary Chart.

Also released in a limited edition package including XM Artist Confidential, a live DVD recorded at the XM Performance Theatre in Washington, D.C., and the live CD Hi Infidelity Then Again...Live, also recorded at the same venue. The CD also includes enhanced video content.

Professional ratings
Review scores
Source	Rating
Allmusic	3/5 stars

== Track listing ==
=== Find Your Own Way Home ===
No.	Title	Writer(s)	Length
1.	"Smilin' in the End"	Kevin Cronin	3:36
2.	"Find Your Own Way Home"	Cronin	4:48
3.	"I Needed to Fall"	Cronin	4:08
4.	"Dangerous Combination"	Cronin, Jim Peterik	4:45
5.	"Lost on the Road of Love"	Cronin	5:16
6.	"Another Lifetime"	Dave Amato, Cronin, Bruce Hall, Bryan Hitt	4:04
7.	"Run Away Baby"	Cronin	3:05
8.	"Everything You Feel"	Cronin	5:29
9.	"Born to Love You"	Hall	4:46
10.	"Let My Love Find You"	Cronin	3:58

European bonus tracks
No.	Title	Writer(s)	Length
11.	"Take It on the Run" (+)	Gary Richrath	2:23
12.	"Smilin' in the End" (+)	Cronin	3:39
13.	"I Needed to Fall" (+)	Cronin	4:18
14.	"Ridin' the Storm Out" (+)	Richrath	4:59
Total length:			59:24

(+) Previously unreleased acoustic versions

=== XM Artist Confidential DVD ===
No.	Title	Writer(s)	Length
1.	"Interview"		0:58
2.	"Music Man"	Cronin	3:38
3.	"Interview"		2:58
4.	"Dangerous Combination"	Cronin, Peterik	4:53
5.	"Interview"		2:54
6.	"Ridin' the Storm Out"	Richrath	5:03
7.	"Interview"		3:32
8.	"I Needed to Fall"	Cronin	4:19
9.	"Interview"		6:07
10.	"Smilin' in the End"	Cronin	3:44
11.	"Interview"		5:20
12.	"Take It on the Run"	Richrath	2:22
13.	"Interview"		1:07
14.	"Roll with the Changes"	Cronin	5:20
Total length:			52:24

=== Hi Infidelity Then Again...Live ===
No.	Title	Writer(s)	Length
1.	"Don't Let Him Go"	Cronin	4:24
2.	"Keep On Loving You"	Cronin	3:31
3.	"Follow My Heart"	Tom Kelly, Richrath	3:34
4.	"In Your Letter"	Richrath	3:12
5.	"Take It on the Run"	Richrath	3:59
6.	"Tough Guys"	Cronin	3:50
7.	"Out of Season"	Cronin, Kelly	3:11
8.	"Shakin' It Loose"	Richrath	2:34
9.	"Someone Tonight"	Hall	2:44
10.	"I Wish You Were There"	Cronin	4:20
Total length:			35:23

Bonus tracks enhanced videos
No.	Title	Writer(s)	Length
1.	"Out of Season"	Cronin, Kelly	3:11
2.	"Someone Tonight"	Hall	2:44
3.	"I Wish You Were There"	Cronin	4:20

== Personnel ==
REO Speedwagon

- Kevin Cronin – lead vocals (1–8, 10), backing vocals, acoustic guitar, rhythm guitars
- Dave Amato – lead guitars, electric guitars, backing vocals
- Neal Doughty – synthesizers, Hammond organ (1)
- Bruce Hall – bass, backing vocals, lead vocals (9)
- Bryan Hitt – drums, percussion

Additional personnel

- Joe Vannelli – acoustic piano (2, 3, 9, 10), Hammond organ (2, 9), "virtual strings" (2, 3, 6, 10), electric piano (5, 7, 8), synthesizers (8)

== Release history ==
Region	Date	Title	Label	Format	Catalog #
USA	2007	Find Your Own Way Home	Speedwagon recordings	CD	5500
USA	April 3, 2007	Find Your Own Way Home; XM Artist Confidential DVD; Hi Infidelity Then Again...Live	Speedwagon recordings	2-CD / DVD (Box set)	7500
USA	April 24, 2007	Find Your Own Way Home	Mailboat	CD	MBOT 3500
UK	2007	Find Your Own Way Home	Artful Records	CD	ARTFULCD61
Germany	September 24, 2007	Find Your Own Way Home	Edel Records	CD (European bonus tracks)	0184492ERE
Japan	2008	Find Your Own Way Home	Teichiku Records	CD (Bonus tracks) / DVD	TECI-33458
