= Bryan Hitt =

American rock drummer (born 1954)

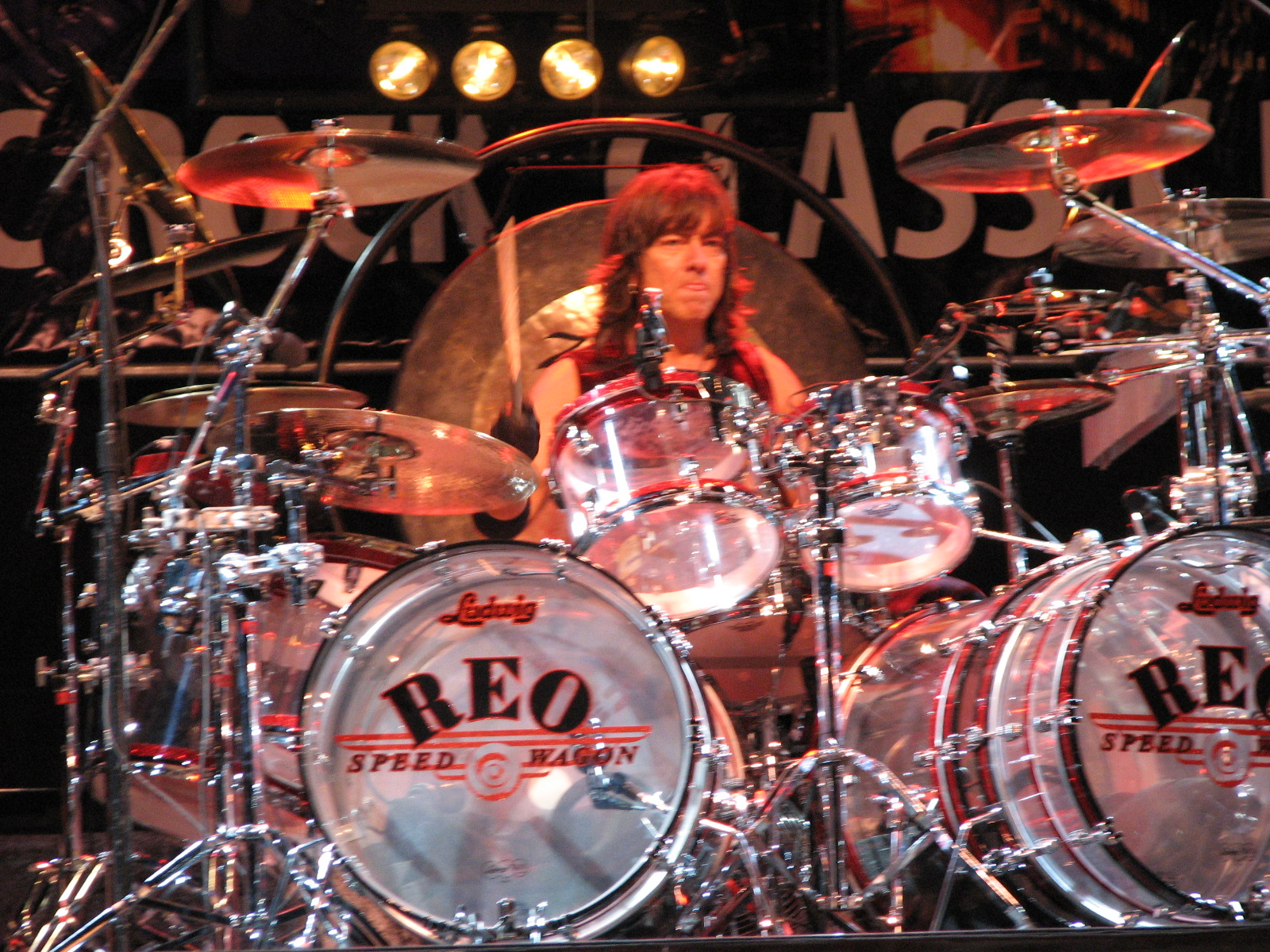
- Hitt with REO Speedwagon in 2007.

Background information
- Born: Bryan Keith Hitt; January 5, 1954 (age 72)
- Origin: Center, Texas, United States
- Genre: Rock
- Occupation: Drums
- Website: www.bryanhitt.com

Bryan Keith Hitt (born January 5, 1954, Center, Texas) is an American rock drummer who is the former drummer for the band REO Speedwagon.

Hitt was born in Wooster, Ohio on January 5, 1954. Prior to his involvement with REO Speedwagon, Hitt played with Cher, Graham Nash, and The Spencer Davis Group. He also recorded with Nick Gilder, Gary Busey and Wang Chung.

He joined REO's lineup in 1989 for the release of the 1990 album The Earth, a Small Man, His Dog and a Chicken. Since that time Hitt has played on three more studio albums with the group: Building the Bridge (1996), Find Your Own Way Home (2007) and Not So Silent Night ... Christmas with REO Speedwagon (2009).
