= Dave Amato =

American guitarist (born 1953)

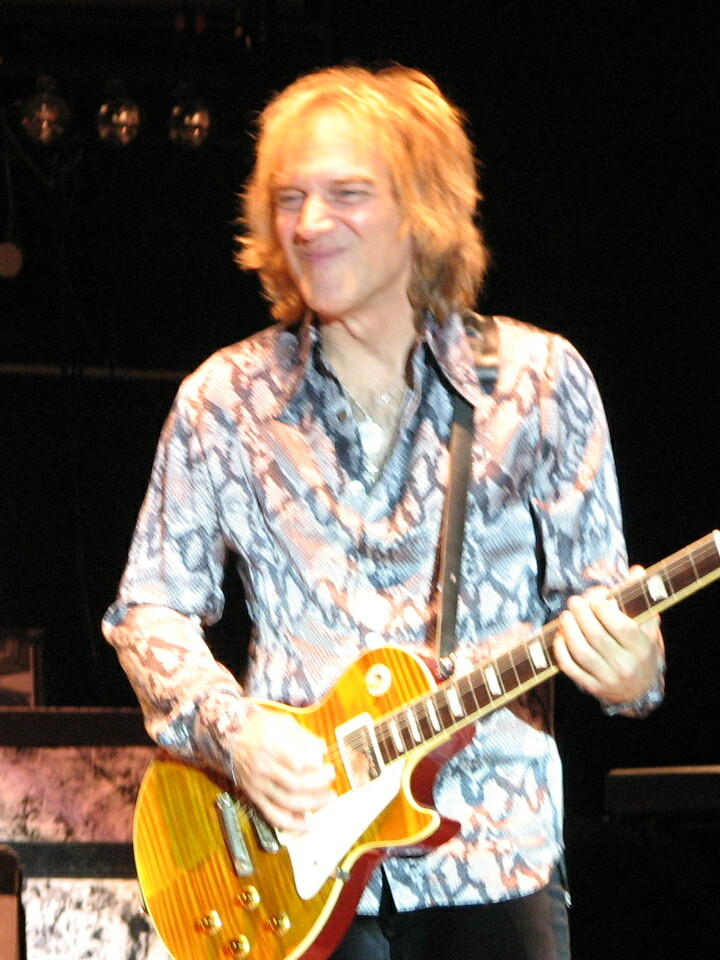
- Amato with REO Speedwagon in 2007.

Background information
- Born: David Paul Amato; March 3, 1953 (age 73)
- Genres: Rock
- Occupations: Musician; singer
- Instruments: Guitar; vocals
- Years active: 1974–present
- Website: daveamato.com

David Paul Amato (born March 3, 1953) is an American musician, the lead guitarist of the rock band REO Speedwagon from May 1989 until their retirement in 2024. and a rhythm guitarist/singer for Ted Nugent in the mid-1980s.

== Early years ==
Amato was born and raised near Framingham, Massachusetts. At age 11, his first band was called The Sandstones. The lineup included Steve Bremner (guitar), Gino Bonvini (bass), and Gary Pegararo (drums). His later bands were named The Aftermath, Dave and the Essex, One Way Out, Sledge-Hamma, Ice, and August.

== Career ==
While fronting Sledge-Hamma, Amato turned down a recording contract and an opening spot with Aerosmith because he felt he wouldn't achieve success on the East Coast. In 1980, Amato moved to Los Angeles, California. He did session work for La Toya Jackson, and sang backing vocals for the likes of David Lee Roth, Rick Springfield, Kim Carnes, and Mötley Crüe.

In 1985, Amato joined Ted Nugent's band, providing both guitar and vocals. His most memorable tour was in 1986 when he sang lead vocals and played guitar with Nugent. They shared the tour bill with Aerosmith. Amato stayed with Nugent for three years and appeared on Little Miss Dangerous and If You Can't Lick 'Em...Lick 'Em. Due to a conflict of schedules, Amato left Nugent in December 1988 when Nugent accepted an unplanned tour and Amato had other obligations. Amato and Nugent remain good friends and have even shared the stage when Nugent has opened for REO Speedwagon.

After leaving Ted Nugent's band, Dave traveled to Australia to tour with Jimmy Barnes. He played guitar on Barnes' double live album Barnestorming. His playing and vocals are also featured on Barnes' earlier albums For The Working Class Man and Freight Train Heart. Amato also played lead guitar and sang some lead vocals with John Elefante (formerly of Kansas) and brother Dino Elefante for their Christian rock group Mastedon, but Amato never officially joined the group. They cut two CDs; It's a Jungle Out There (1988) and Lofcaudio (1990).

When lead guitarist Gary Richrath left REO Speedwagon in 1989, Amato joined the band in July. He said the "REO songs are great because there is a guitar solo in every song."

Amato also toured extensively as the lead guitarist for Cher, and in 1991 he toured for Richie Sambora's Stranger in This Town as well as select performances when Richie was promoting his Undiscovered Soul album. In 1990 he appeared in the video for Michael Bolton's hit How Can We Be Lovers and briefly toured with Player in 1998. As of July 2026 Amato is touring as part of ex-Eagles guitarist Don Felder's band.

== Discography ==
with Ted Nugent

- Little Miss Dangerous
- If You Can't Lick 'Em...Lick 'Em

with Jimmy Barnes

- For The Working Class Man
- Freight Train Heart
- Barnestorming

with Richie Sambora

- Undiscovered Soul

with REO Speedwagon

- The Earth, a Small Man, His Dog and a Chicken
- Building the Bridge
- Find Your Own Way Home
- Not So Silent Night...Christmas with REO Speedwagon

with Mastedon

- It's A Jungle Out There
- Lofcaudo
- Revolution Of Mind
