= REO Speedwagon =

American rock band

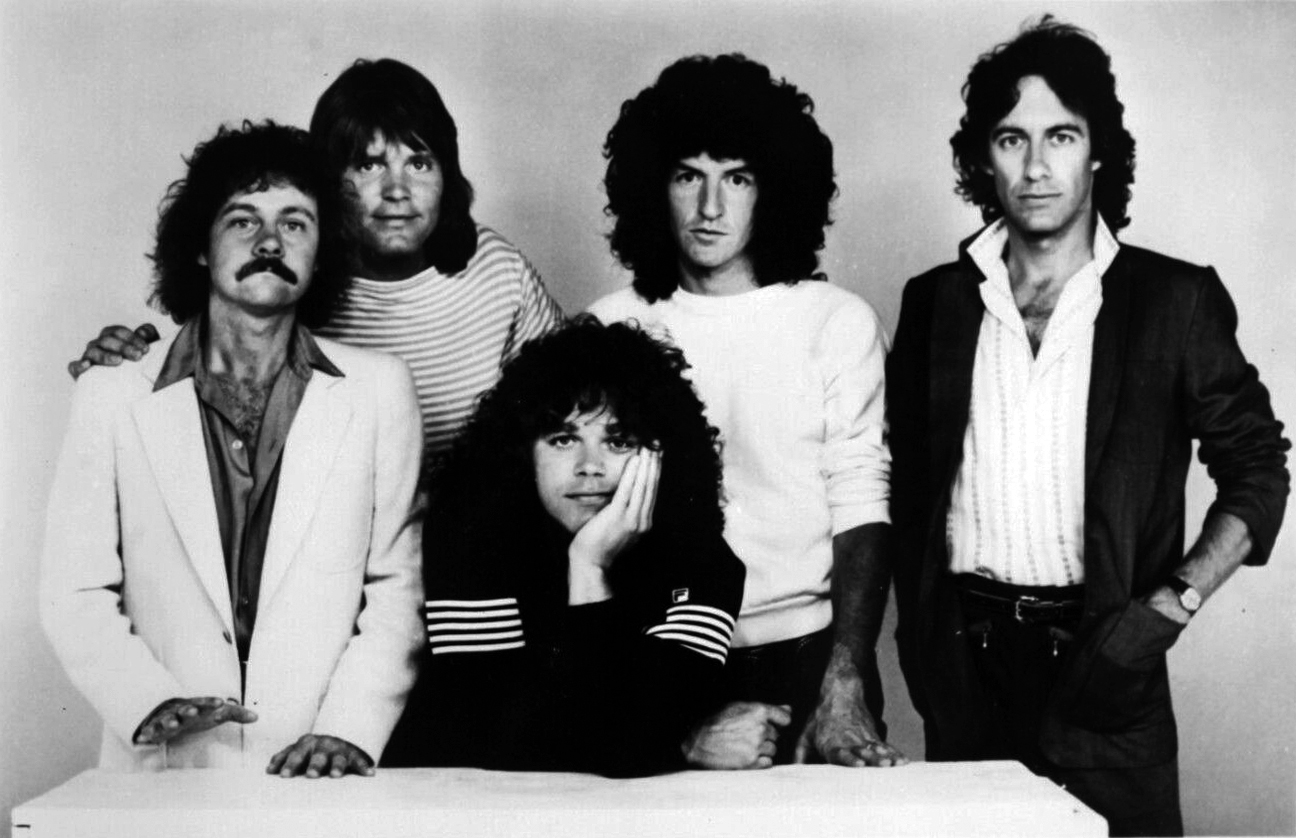
- REO Speedwagon in 1982. From left to right: Neal Doughty, Bruce Hall, Gary Richrath, Kevin Cronin and Alan Gratzer

Background information
- Origin: Champaign, Illinois, U.S.
- Genres: Arena rock; pop rock; hard rock; AOR; blues rock (early)
- Works: Discography
- Years active: 1967–2024 (see below)
- Labels: Epic; Speedwagon; Sony/Legacy
- Past members: Neal Doughty; Alan Gratzer; Mike Blair; Joe Matt; Bob Cranover; Terry Luttrell; Joe McCabe; Gregg Philbin; Marty Shepard; Bill Fiorio; Steve Scorfina; Gary Richrath; Kevin Cronin; Mike Murphy; Bruce Hall; Graham Lear; Carla Day; Melanie Jackson; Miles Joseph; Dave Amato; Jesse Harms; Bryan Hitt
- Website: reospeedwagon.com

REO Speedwagon (originally stylized as R.E.O. Speedwagon), or simply REO, was an American rock band formed in Champaign, Illinois, in 1967. The band cultivated a following during the 1970s and achieved significant commercial success throughout the 1980s. Their best-selling album, Hi Infidelity (1980), contained four US Top 40 hits and sold more than 10 million copies.

REO Speedwagon sold more than 40 million records and charted thirteen Top 40 hits, including the number ones "Keep On Loving You" and "Can't Fight This Feeling". After sixteen studio albums, and numerous lineup changes (with Neal Doughty the only constant member), REO Speedwagon retired in December 2024. The band has since made occasional one-off live appearances.

== History ==
=== Formation ===
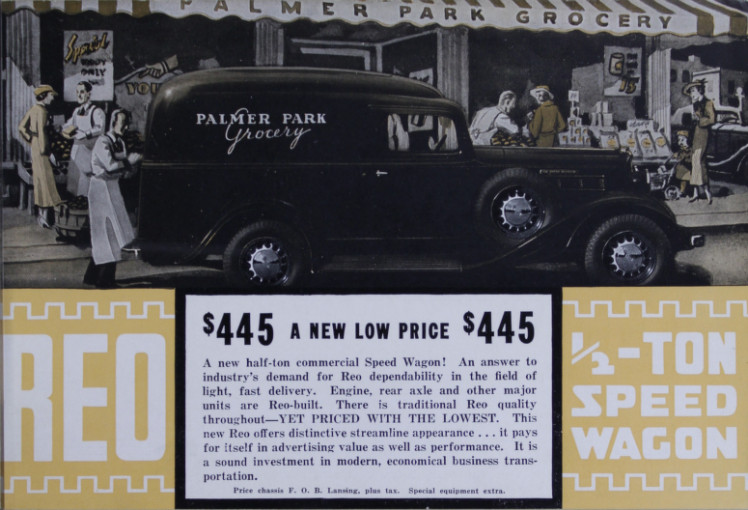
Advertisement for a REO Speed Wagon

In the fall of 1966, Neal Doughty was a junior at the University of Illinois in Champaign, Illinois, where he met fellow student Alan Gratzer. Doughty had learned some Beatles songs on his parents' piano, and Gratzer had been a drummer in local bands since high school.

Gratzer continued performing with his band (which had a keyboard-playing lead singer), and Doughty eventually sat in for a few songs. On the last day of the university's spring semester, guitarist Joe Matt called the band's leader and told him that he and the other members (Gratzer and bassist Mike Blair) had decided to start a new band with Doughty where everyone but Doughty would sing.

The new band made a list of songs to learn over the summer break. Doughty landed a summer job and bought a Farfisa organ. The members returned to school in the fall of 1967 and had their first rehearsal before classes started. They named the band REO Speedwagon after Doughty saw it written on a blackboard, from the REO Speed Wagon truck designed in 1915 by Ransom Eli Olds. Rather than pronouncing REO as a single word as the motor company did ("REE-oh"), they chose to pronounce each letter individually ("R-E-O"). An advertisement in the school newspaper produced their first gig, a frat party that turned into a food fight. They performed cover songs in campus bars, frat parties, and university events.

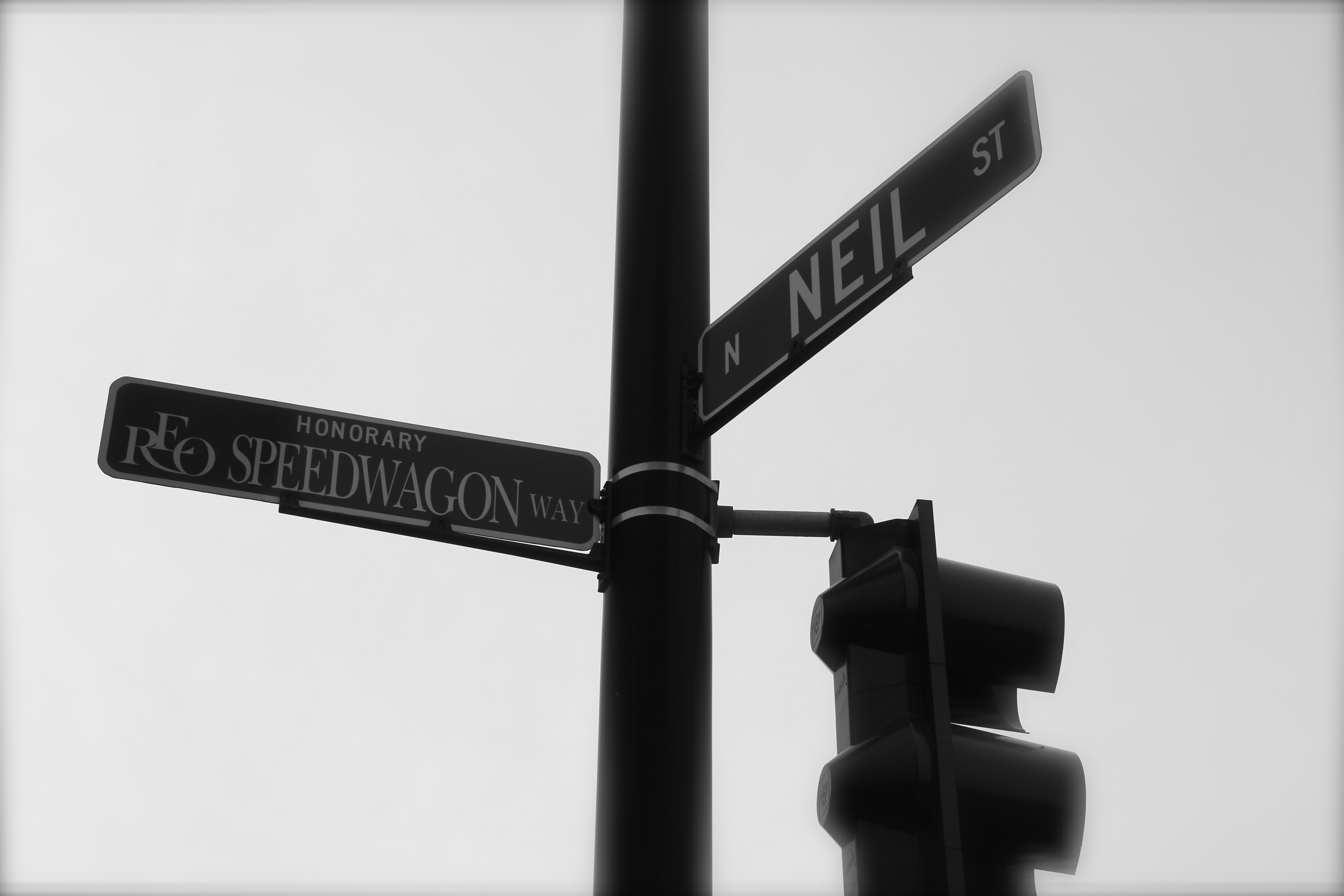
Main Street in Champaign, named REO Speedwagon Way in honor of the band

In early 1968, Terry Luttrell became lead singer, and Bob Crownover joined on guitar, replacing Matt. When Mike Blair left in 1968, Gregg Philbin replaced Blair. Joe McCabe played sax until he was replaced by Marty Shepard on trumpet, soon joined by a second trumpeter named Steve Massingill, with Doughty as a third horn player on some tunes. After Shepard left the following year, horns were dropped from the group altogether.

Bob Crownover was replaced first by Bill Fiorio in 1969, and then Steve Scorfina, before Gary Richrath took over on guitar in 1970. Richrath had driven 100 miles (160 km) to see the band. A prolific songwriter who brought with him original compositions, the band's regional popularity grew with Richrath on board. Support from KSHE in St. Louis, one of the most influential rock stations in the country, further elevated the band's profile.

Epic Records signed the band to a contract in 1971. The lineup on the first album consisted of Richrath, Gratzer, Doughty, Philbin, and Luttrell.

=== Early years ===
In the early days, REO was managed by its University of Illinois classmate Irving Azoff, who went on to manage The Eagles and ran MCA Music Entertainment Group. With the use of a friend's station wagon, REO played bars and clubs across the Midwest. Its debut album, R.E.O. Speedwagon, was released on Epic Records in October 1971.

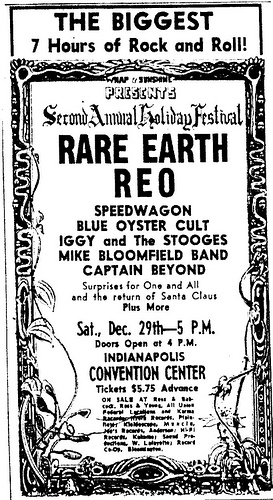
A newspaper advertisement for a concert featuring REO in Indianapolis in 1973

Although the lineup otherwise remained stable, REO Speedwagon switched lead vocalists on each of their first three albums.

Kevin Cronin recorded 1972's R.E.O./T.W.O. but was fired during the recording sessions for 1973's Ridin' the Storm Out, which was completed with Mike Murphy. Murphy stuck and contributed songs, rhythm guitar and vocals to Lost in a Dream (1974) and This Time We Mean It (1975) before Cronin returned in 1976 for R.E.O..

On the strength of the band's live performances, Epic agreed to their first live album, Live: You Get What You Play For in 1977, which sold certified platinum and the band, minus Philbin, relocated to Los Angeles. Philbin's place was taken by another Champaign Centennial High School alumnus, Bruce Hall, for You Can Tune a Piano but You Can't Tuna Fish in 1978. Featuring the chart singles "Roll with the Changes" and "Time for Me to Fly", it was REO's first album to make the Top 40, and achieved double platinum status.

=== Mainstream success ===
After 1979's Nine Lives, the band went from hard rock to more pop-oriented material starting with Hi Infidelity in 1980. Hi Infidelity spawned four hits, most notably Cronin's "Keep On Loving You" and "Take It on the Run", penned by Richrath. The album stayed on the charts for 65 weeks (32 in the top 10), including 15 weeks at No. 1 on the Billboard 200. Hi Infidelity sold over ten million copies.

The follow-up, Good Trouble, in June 1982, performed moderately well commercially and featured "Keep the Fire Burnin'" (U.S. No. 7). 1984's Wheels Are Turnin', included the No. 1 hit "Can't Fight This Feeling".

REO Speedwagon toured the US in 1985, including a stop in Philadelphia at the US leg of Live Aid. 1987's Life as We Know It and The Hits compilation in 1988 brought minor hits and declining sales, and wrapped up the careers of Richrath and Gratzer in the band. "Here with Me", which peaked at No. 20, was the group's final hit on the main chart.

=== Changes in the 1990s ===
Graham Lear and Miles Joseph replaced Gratzer and Richrath, and backup singers Carla Day and Melanie Jackson were added. This lineup performed one show, in Chile in 1989, after which Joseph, Day, and Jackson were let go in favor of Dave Amato and keyboardist Jesse Harms. 1990's The Earth, a Small Man, His Dog and a Chicken, with Bryan Hitt on drums, brought the band's final main chart single, "Love Is a Rock", which peaked at No. 65. Not inclined to be out on the road touring, Harms left in 1991.

After forming his own short-lived band, Richrath joined REO on stage in Los Angeles on two occasions. The contract with Epic at an end, REO Speedwagon released Building the Bridge independently in 1996. The title track was used as the "theme song" for Bill Clinton's 1996 presidential campaign.

=== 2000-2024 ===
As Epic released REO compilation albums, REO teamed up with Styx in 2000 for a tour that included an appearance at Riverport Amphitheater in St. Louis, which was released as the live concert video Arch Allies: Live at Riverport. REO's portion of the show was re-released as Live - Plus (2001), Live Plus 3 (2001), and Extended Versions (2001), which was certified gold in 2006. REO toured with Styx again in 2001 and alongside Journey in 2003.

The self-financed Find Your Own Way Home in 2007, produced two singles, "I Needed to Fall" and "Find Your Own Way Home", that appeared on Billboard's Adult Contemporary chart. REO Speedwagon continued to tour regularly, on their own and in tandem with other bands of their era, mostly performing their classic hits.

2009 brought a Christmas album, Not So Silent Night...Christmas with REO Speedwagon.

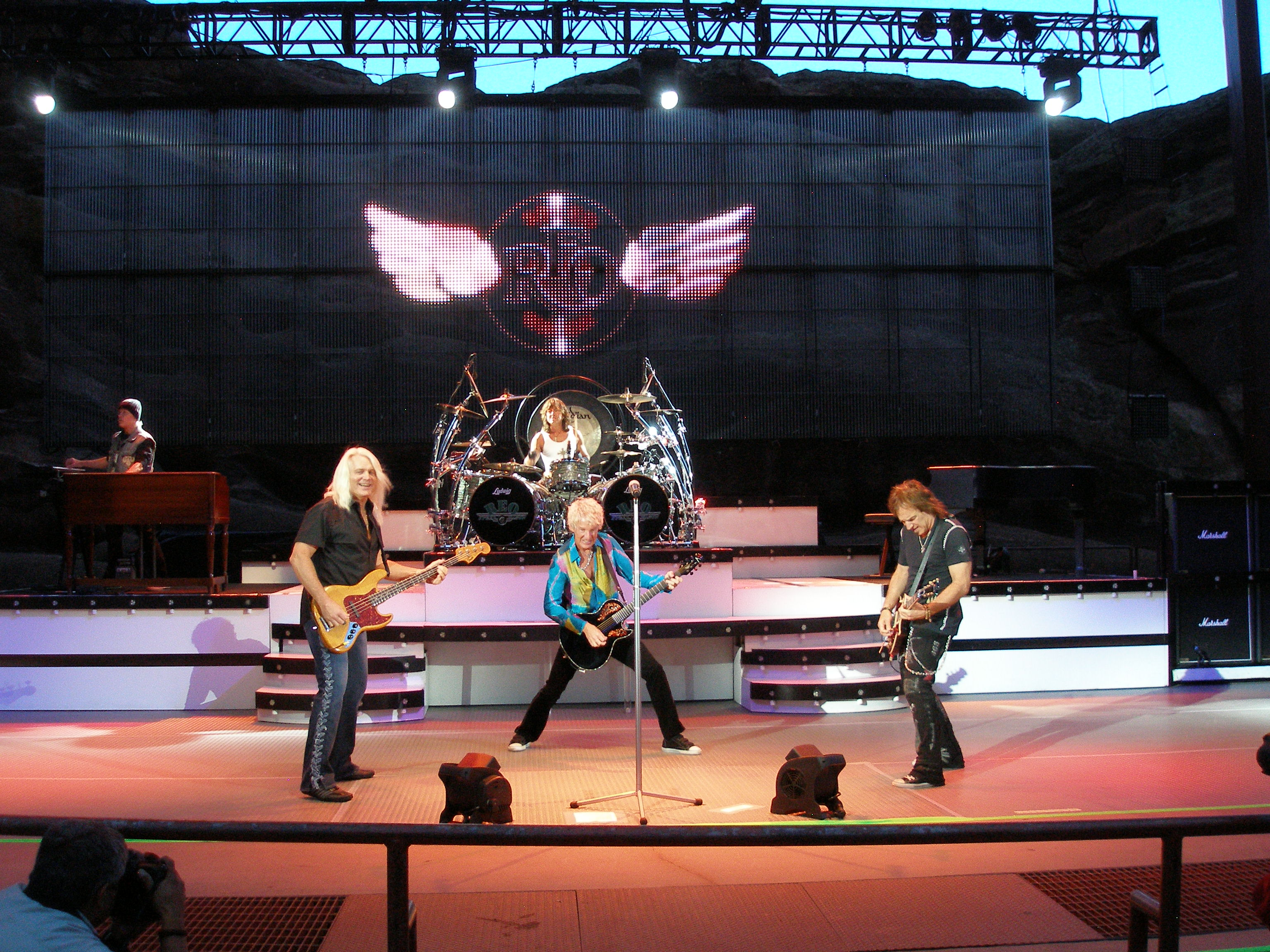
REO Speedwagon performing live at the Red Rocks Amphitheater in Morrison, Colorado, in 2010

At a 2013 benefit concert for Illinois tornado victims, Richrath appeared onstage with the band for the first time since the 1990s. This would be his final live performance prior to his death in 2015.

In 2017, Hi Infidelity received the Diamond Award for official U.S. sales of over ten million copies.

The band appeared in an episode in the third season of the Netflix series Ozark in 2020, after which four REO songs reentered the Billboard rock charts.

Gregg Philbin died in 2022. In 2023, the band's sole remaining original member, Neal Doughty, retired from touring after 55 years. The band announced Derek Hilland (ex-Iron Butterfly) as a touring replacement. Bruce Hall announced he would take a leave of absence to undergo back surgery, with plans to rejoin the band on tour in 2024, with Matt Bissonette filling in.

On September 16, 2024, the band announced they would stop touring at year's end. Although Hall was sufficiently recovered from his surgery and cleared by his doctors to return to touring, there were irreconcilable differences between himself and Doughty versus Cronin.

=== Post-retirement activity ===
Though the REO name had been retired, Cronin announced that he would continue to tour with the final touring lineup (Amato, Hitt, Hilland, Bissonette) as the 'Kevin Cronin Band', performing REO Speedwagon songs. The Kevin Cronin Band toured in 2025 with Styx, with Don Felder opening, before again announcing a cessation of activity at the year's end.

On June 14, 2025, REO Speedwagon, without Cronin, reunited for a one-off show in its hometown, Champaign, Illinois, at the State Farm Center. The show featured Doughty, Hall, and Gratzer (in his first performance since 1988), alongside Mike Murphy and vocal/guitar trio Levon. Other former members Terry Luttrell and Steve Scorfina performed a four-song opening set. Richrath's son, Eric, also guested with the band.

On September 28, 2025, the band's classic lineup (minus Richrath) reunited alongside the University of Illinois marching band, performing three songs. Cronin did not sing (as the melodies were provided by the marching band), but it was the first time Cronin, Hall, Doughty, and Gratzer shared a stage since 1988.

On March 7, 2026, REO Speedwagon reunited again as Cronin, Doughty, Hall, and Gratzer marked the opening of an exhibit honoring Richrath at the Peoria Riverfront Museum. They were joined by Murphy and Eric Richrath. After a Q&A session, the band played four songs. Murphy and Cronin traded lead vocals during "Ridin' the Storm Out," marking the first time the two ever performed together. This was also Gratzer's first performance with Cronin since 1988.

== Band members ==
Classic lineup (1977—1988)

- Neal Doughty – keyboards (1966–2024; not touring 2023–2024)
- Alan Gratzer – drums, backing vocals (1966–1988)
- Gary Richrath – guitar, vocals (1970–1989; died 2015)
- Kevin Cronin – vocals, rhythm guitar, keyboards (1972–1973, 1976–2024)
- Bruce Hall – bass, vocals (1977–2024; not touring late 2023–2024)

== Discography ==
Studio albums

- R.E.O. Speedwagon (1971)
- R.E.O./T.W.O. (1972)
- Ridin' the Storm Out (1973)
- Lost in a Dream (1974)
- This Time We Mean It (1975)
- R.E.O. (1976)
- You Can Tune a Piano, but You Can't Tuna Fish (1978)
- Nine Lives (1979)
- Hi Infidelity (1980)
- Good Trouble (1982)
- Wheels Are Turnin' (1984)
- Life as We Know It (1987)
- The Earth, a Small Man, His Dog and a Chicken (1990)
- Building the Bridge (1996)
- Find Your Own Way Home (2007)
- Not So Silent Night ... Christmas with REO Speedwagon (2009)

== See also ==
- List of artists who reached number one in the United States
