= Kevin Cronin =

American singer

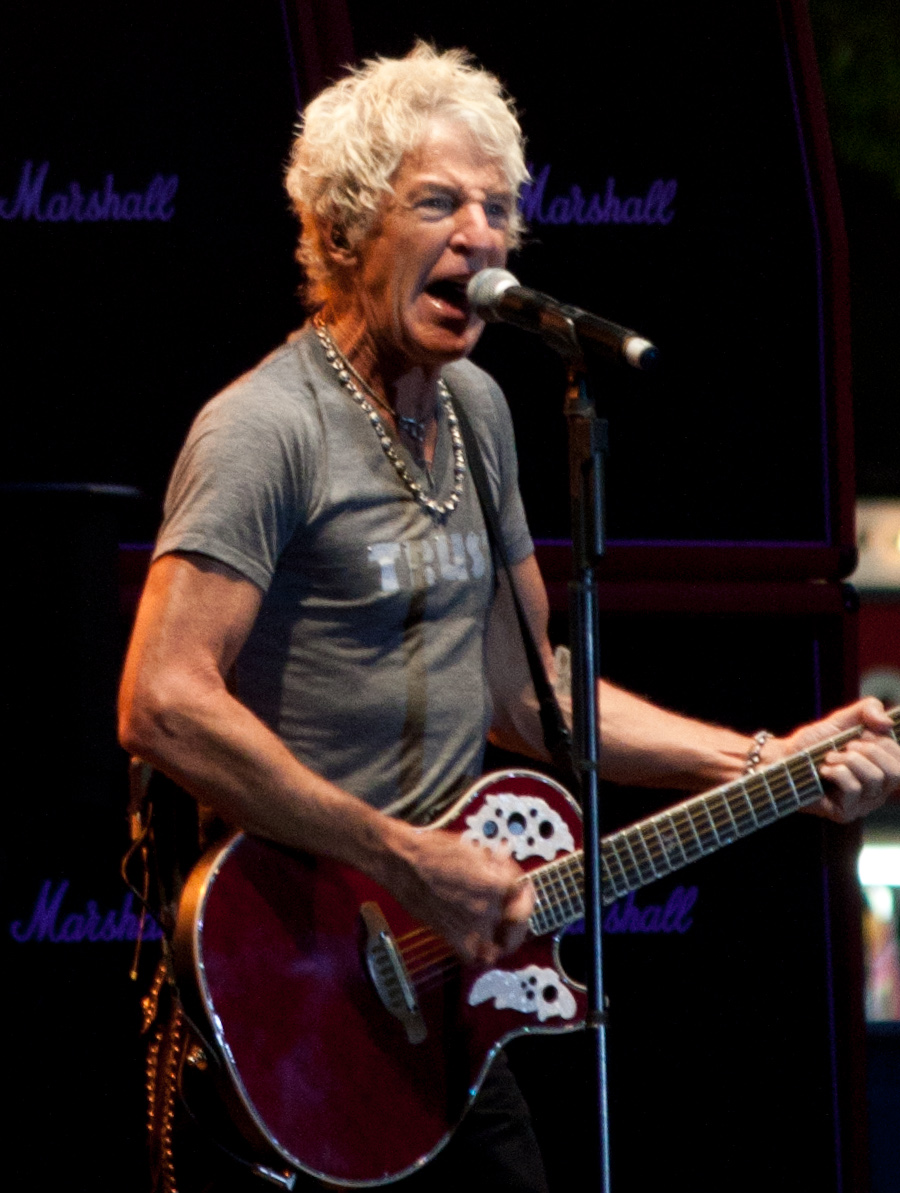
- Cronin performing with REO Speedwagon in 2011

Background information
- Born: Kevin Patrick Cronin; October 6, 1951 (age 75); Evanston, Illinois, U.S.
- Genres: Arena rock; pop rock; hard rock; AOR
- Occupations: Singer; musician; songwriter
- Instruments: Vocals; guitar; piano
- Years active: 1970–present
- Formerly of: REO Speedwagon
- Spouse: Lisa Marie
- Website: kevincronin.com

Kevin Patrick Cronin Jr. (born October 6, 1951) is an American musician who was the lead vocalist and rhythm guitarist for the rock band REO Speedwagon. The band had several hits on the Billboard Hot 100 throughout the 1970s and 1980s, including two chart-toppers written by Cronin: "Keep On Loving You" (1980) and "Can't Fight This Feeling" (1984).

== Early life ==
Cronin is from the suburbs of Chicago, Illinois. He was born in north suburban Evanston but grew up in southwest suburban Oak Lawn, where he learned to play guitar. He attended St. Linus Catholic Elementary School. Cronin went on to graduate from nearby Brother Rice High School in Chicago.

== Career ==
Cronin joined REO Speedwagon shortly after the group recorded its debut album in 1971. He recorded one album with the band, 1972's R.E.O./T.W.O., but left the band soon after because of missed rehearsals and creative disagreements. Following a brief solo career, Cronin returned to the band in 1976.

Cronin's return came after Greg X. Volz turned down the lead vocalist position due to his conversion to Christianity. Even though the band's success hit its peak in the late 1970s and early 1980s, it still released records in the 2000s such as Find Your Own Way Home in 2007. Its most famous album, Hi Infidelity, sold over 10 million copies. Cronin has stated in various interviews that they "play for free but get paid for the traveling". He has written or co-written many of the band's hit songs such as "Keep On Loving You", "Can't Fight This Feeling", "Keep the Fire Burnin'", "I Do' Wanna Know", "Keep Pushin'", "Roll with the Changes", "Time for Me to Fly", "Here with Me", "In My Dreams", and "Don't Let Him Go". Cronin possesses the vocal range of a dramatic tenor.

When MTV was first established, Cronin was the first person offered a VJ position, but turned it down due to time constraints caused by band tours.

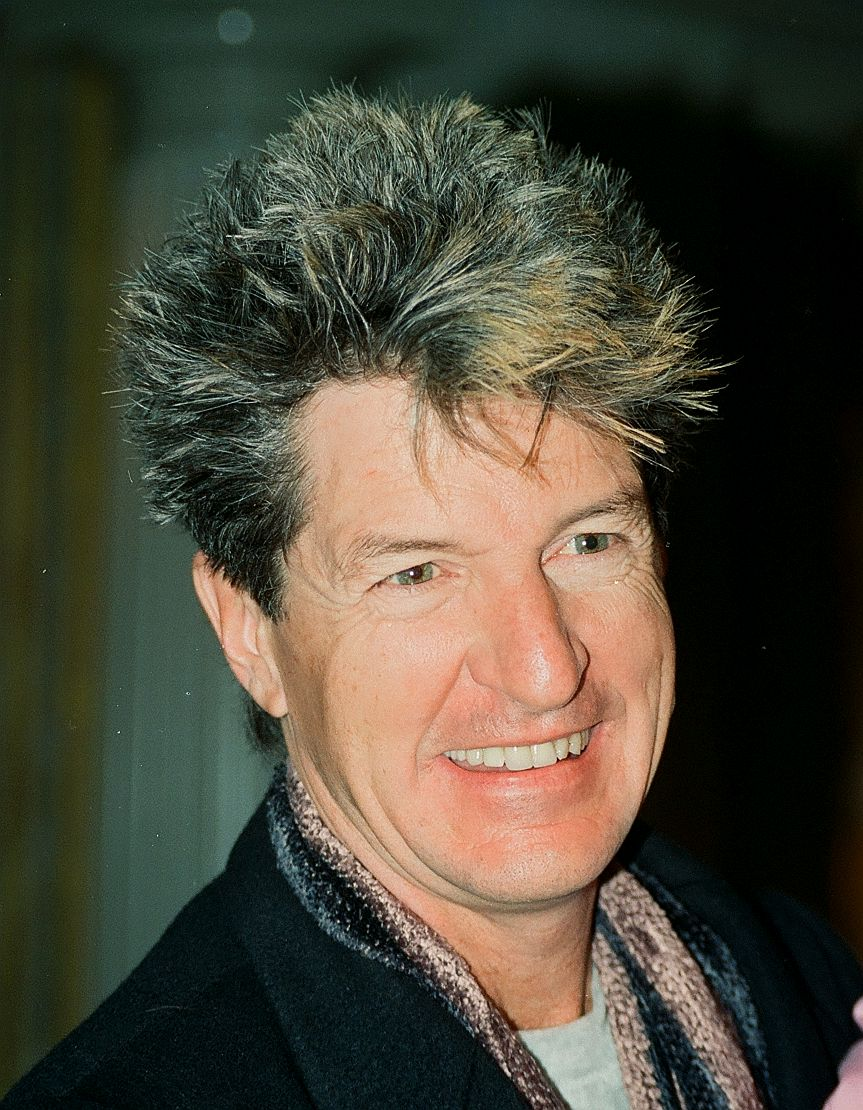
Cronin in 2001

Cronin was a celebrity contestant on Don't Forget the Lyrics! in March 2008. He reached $350,000 before forgetting the lyrics to "Last Dance" by Donna Summer.

He appears on an infomercial advertising Time Life's Ultimate Rock Ballads, which feature tracks by REO Speedwagon, mostly from the 1980s, when the band enjoyed their greatest success.

Cronin appeared on the Netflix original series Ozark along with bandmates from REO Speedwagon in episode three of season three, entitled "Kevin Cronin Was Here". They performed "Time for Me to Fly". The popularity of the show led to a resurgence on the Billboard charts for the band in April 2020, as well as a placement onto the digital charts not in existence at the time of the initial hit songs.

Cronin is known for his down-to-earth, connected presence in concerts. In a 2016 interview with Parade, he was asked about remembering so many cities while touring. He said, "If you don't know what city you're in when playing a concert, shame on you. The people that are coming to your concert expect that you're connected with them. Hey, they're connected with you! I go out of my way in every city to go out for a walk, read the local paper and talk to people."

In January 2024, the band announced that REO would tour with Train in the Summer Road Trip tour, hitting 44 cities. Cronin said the band has done benefit shows for years. "I love the idea of bringing together people of all ages, who share a common love for well-crafted songs and high-energy live performances. The REO boys are stoked about this tour."

In September 2024, the band announced that they would cease touring by the end of the year. In December 2024, Cronin announced the end of REO Speedwagon, and that he and the current touring band would continue under a different name. The touring band consists of guitarist Dave Amato, drummer Bryan Hitt, keyboardist Derek Hilland and bassist Matt Bissonette.

== Personal life ==
Cronin's mother was a social worker; his father was in newspapers. When he was seven, his parents adopted three children. Cronin and his first wife, Denise, have one child together. He married Lisa Marie Wells on April 25, 1992. They have three children together. He started playing guitar in bands when he was fourteen. His first professional band was Fuchsia.

== Gear ==
=== Guitars ===
- 1952 Fender Telecaster
- 1950 Fender Broadcaster
- Gibson Les Paul
- Ovation Viper Series 6 & 12 String

=== Amps ===
- Vox AC-30 Combos

=== Accessories ===
- Ernie Ball Acoustic & Electric Guitar Strings
