= April Wine discography =

Cataloging of published recordings by April Wine

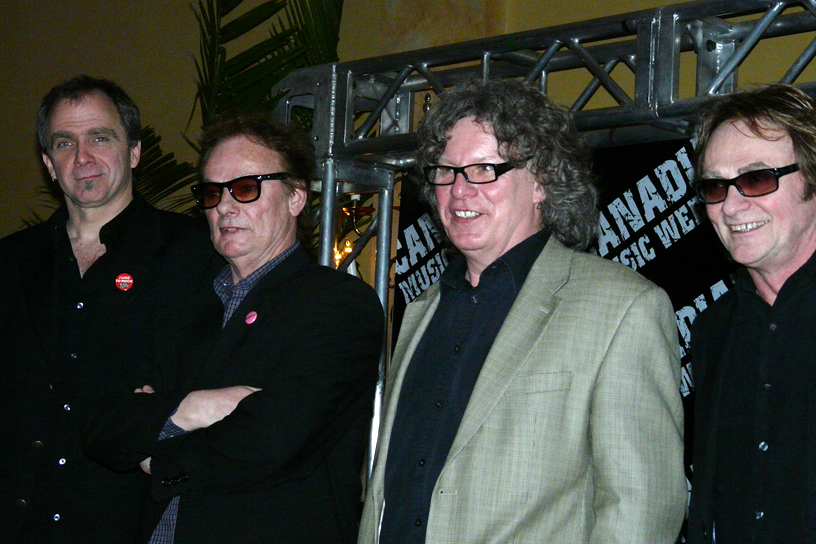
- April Wine in 2009
- Studio albums: 16
- Live albums: 9
- Compilation albums: 15
- Singles: 34
- Video albums: 1

The discography of Canadian rock band April Wine consists of 16 studio albums, 15 compilation albums and nine live albums. Additionally, they have released 34 singles.

== Albums ==
=== Studio albums ===
Year	Title	Chart positions		Certifications (sales thresholds)	Record label
Year	Title	CAN	US	Certifications (sales thresholds)	Record label
1971	April Wine	—	205		Aquarius
1972	On Record	35	—		Aquarius
1973	Electric Jewels	75	—		Aquarius
1975	Stand Back	21	—	CAN: 2× Platinum	Aquarius
1976	The Whole World's Goin' Crazy	1	—	CAN: Platinum	Aquarius
1977	Forever for Now	5	—	CAN: Gold	Aquarius
1978	First Glance	62	114	CAN: Gold	Aquarius
1979	Harder ... Faster	25	64	CAN: Platinum; US: Gold	Aquarius
1981	The Nature of the Beast	11	26	CAN: 2× Platinum; US: Platinum	Aquarius
1982	Power Play	14	37	CAN: Platinum	Aquarius
1984	Animal Grace	34	62		Aquarius
1985	Walking Through Fire	—	174		Aquarius
1993	Attitude	19	—	CAN: Gold	MCA
1994	Frigate	—	—		MCA
2001	Back to the Mansion	—	—		MCA
2006	Roughly Speaking	—	—		Universal

=== Compilation albums ===
- Greatest Hits (1979) - 2× Platinum (CRIA)
- Best of April Wine: Rock Ballads (1981) - Gold (CRIA)
- Review and Preview (1981)
- The Hits (1987) - Platinum (CRIA)
- All the Rockers (1987)
- We Like to Rock (1988)
- The First Decade (1989)
- Oowatanite (1990)
- The April Wine Collection (1992)
- Champions of Rock (1996)
- Rock Champions (2000)
- Classic Masters (2002)
- Best of April Wine (2003)
- April Wine Rocks! (2006)
- The Hard & Heavy Collection (2009)

=== Live albums ===
- Live! (1974)
- Live at the El Mocambo (1977)
- Ladies Man EP (1980)
- Monsters of Rock (1980)
- One for the Road (1985)
- Greatest Hits Live (1999)
- I Like to Rock (2002)
- Greatest Hits Live 2003 (2003)
- Live in London (audio CD) (2009)
- Live in America (2023)

== Singles ==
Year	Single	Peak chart positions				Certifications (sales thresholds)	Album
Year	Single	CAN	US	US Rock	UK	Certifications (sales thresholds)	Album
1971	"Fast Train"	38	—	x	—		April Wine
1972	"You Could Have Been a Lady"	2	32	x	—		On Record
1972	"Bad Side Of The Moon"	16	106	x	—		On Record
1972	"Drop Your Guns"	34	—	x	—		On Record
1973	"Lady Run, Lady Hide"	19	—	x	—		Electric Jewels
1973	"Weeping Widow"	40	—	x	—		Electric Jewels
1974	"Electric Jewels"	84	—	x	—		Electric Jewels
1974	"I'm on Fire for You Baby"	64	—	x	—		single
1974	"I Wouldn't Want to Lose Your Love"	17	—	x	—		Stand Back
1975	"Tonite is a Wonderful Time to Fall in Love"	5	—	x	—		Stand Back
1975	"Cum, Hear the Band"	29	—	x	—		Stand Back
1975	"Oowatanite"	11	—	x	—		Stand Back
1976	"The Whole World's Goin' Crazy"	5	—	x	—		The Whole World's Goin' Crazy
1976	"Gimme Love"	33	—	x	—		The Whole World's Goin' Crazy
1976	"Like a Lover, Like a Song"	49	—	x	—		The Whole World's Goin' Crazy
1977	"Forever for Now"	45	—	x	—		Forever for Now
1977	"You Won't Dance With Me"	6	—	x	—	CAN: Gold	Forever for Now
1978	"Rock and Roll Is a Vicious Game"	27	—	x	—		First Glance
1978	"Comin' Right Down on Top of Me"	46	—	x	—		First Glance
1979	"Roller"	24	34	x	—		First Glance
1979	"Get Ready for Love"	79	—	x	—		First Glance
1980	"Say Hello"	34	104	x	—		Harder ... Faster
1980	"I Like to Rock"	75	86	x	41		Harder ... Faster
1981	"Just Between You and Me"	22	21	11	52		The Nature of the Beast
1981	"Sign of the Gypsy Queen"	40	57	19	—		The Nature of the Beast
1982	"Enough Is Enough"	12	50	9	—		Power Play
1982	"Tell Me Why"	46	—	—	—		Power Play
1984	"This Could Be the Right One"	—	58	23	—		Animal Grace
1985	"Rock Myself to Sleep"	—	—	—	—		Walking Through Fire
1985	"Love Has Remembered Me"	89	—	—	—		Walking Through Fire
1993	"If You Believe in Me"	19	—	—	—		Attitude
1993	"Here's Lookin' at You Kid"	80	—	—	—		Attitude
1993	"That's Love"	73	—	35	—		Attitude
1993	"Voice in My Heart"	35	—	—	—		Attitude
1994	"I'm a Man"	—	—	—	—		Frigate
1994	"Driving with My Eyes Closed"	—	—	—	—		Frigate
1994	"If I Was a Stranger"	—	—	—	—		Frigate
"—" denotes releases that did not chart or were not released in that territory. "x" denotes that the chart did not exist at the time.

=== Other charted songs ===
Year	Single	Peak chart positions	Album
Year	Single	US Rock	Album
1981	"All Over Town"	29	The Nature of the Beast
1982	"If You See Kay"	26	Power Play

== Video and DVDs ==
- Live in London (live concert video) (1981)
- From the Front Row ... Live! (DVD-Audio) (2003)

== See also ==
- Myles Goodwyn discography
