= List of April Wine band members =

Canadian rock band members

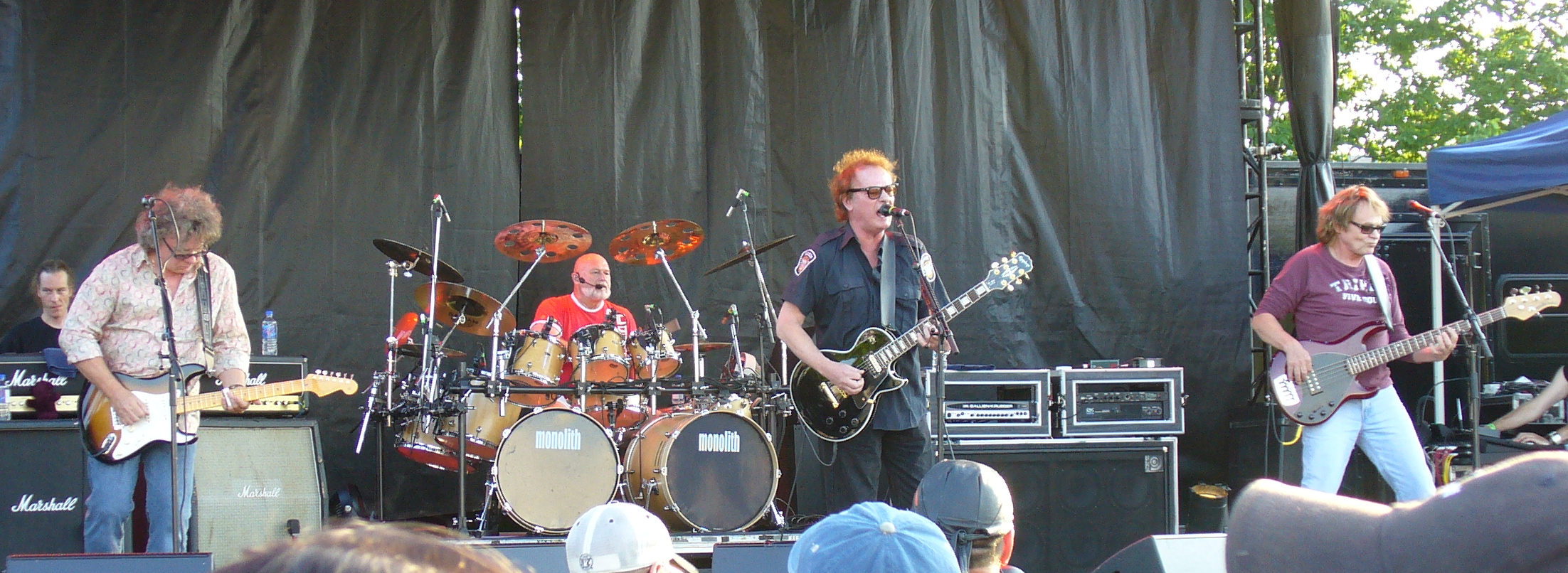
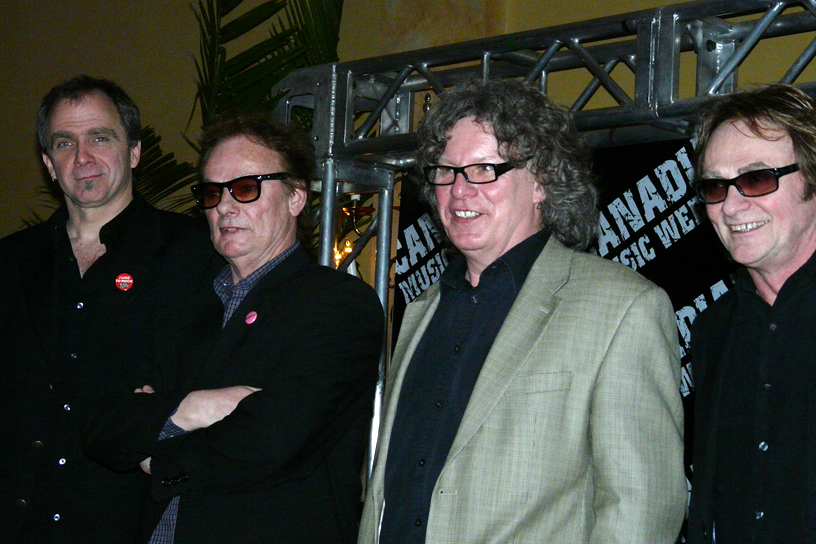
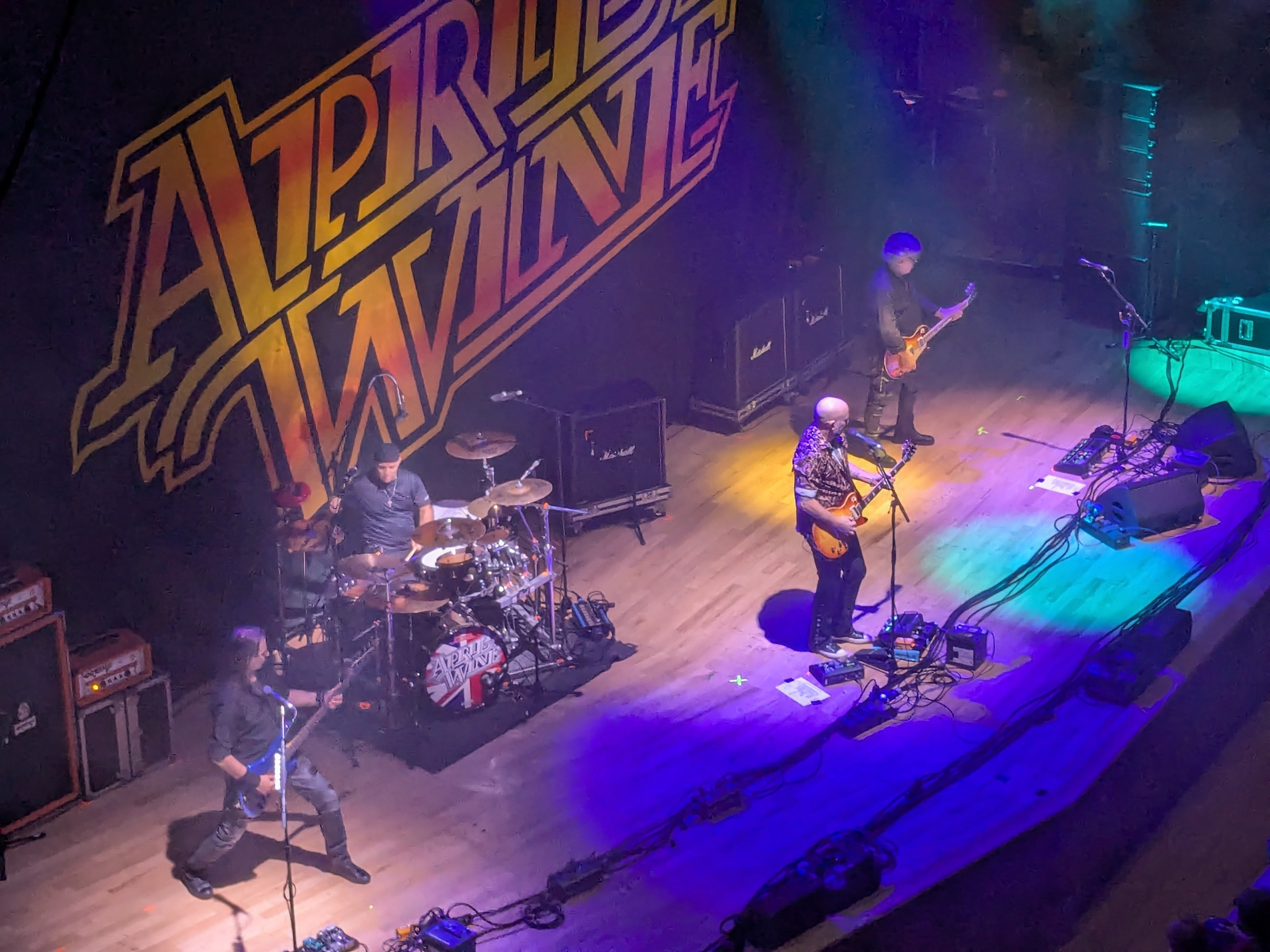
Three line-ups of April Wine in 2008, 2009 and 2025

April Wine is a Canadian rock band from Waverley, Nova Scotia. Formed in 1969, the group originally consisted of guitarist and lead vocalist Myles Goodwyn, guitarist David Henman, bassist Jim Henman, and drummer and keyboardist Ritchie Henman. The band's current lineup features guitarist Brian Greenway (a member since 1977), bassist Richard Lanthier (since 2011), drummer Roy Nichol (since 2012) and guitarist and lead vocalist Marc Parent (since 2022).

== History ==
=== 1969–1985 ===
April Wine was formed in the fall of 1969 by brothers David and Ritchie Henman (on guitar/vocals and drums, respectively) with their cousin Jim (on lead vocals and bass) and friend Myles Goodwyn (on guitar and vocals). According to David, the band's first official rehearsal took place on December 1, 1969. The group soon relocated to Montreal, Quebec and signed with Aquarius Records, recording and releasing their self-titled debut album in 1971. After the album was released, Jim Henman left April Wine in October 1971, with Jim Clench taking his place. On Record followed in 1972, before the Henman brothers also departed in September 1973, after a period of intensive touring which left them "burned out". Goodwyn and Clench brought in Gary Moffet and Jerry Mercer to record that year's Electric Jewels.

The lineup of Goodwyn, Moffet, Clench and Mercer released Live! in 1974 and Stand Back in 1975, before Clench left after disagreements with the rest of the band concerning "musical direction". He was replaced by Steve Lang, who debuted on The Whole World's Goin' Crazy the next year. Forever for Now and Live at the El Mocambo followed in 1977, before Brian Greenway of The Dudes (which featured David and Ritchie Henman) joined the band that August, making it a five-piece for the first time. The new five-piece lineup remained stable for several years, releasing a string of successful albums, but eventually disbanded after Goodwyn and the rest of the band grew apart due to creative differences; they played a farewell tour which ended on July 31, 1984, and spawned the live album One for the Road.

Despite the band's breakup, April Wine was still contractually obligated to produce one more album for Capitol Records. Goodwyn, who had recently moved to Nassau, The Bahamas, therefore led the production of Walking Through Fire in 1985, which featured Greenway and session musicians Jean Pellerin (bass), Marty Simon (drums) and Daniel Barbe (keyboards).

=== Since 1992 ===
After several years of occasional discussions, April Wine officially reunited in July 1992. Alongside returning members Myles Goodwyn and Brian Greenway, the new lineup also included former bassist Jim Clench and drummer Jerry Mercer, plus new third guitarist Steve Segal. Gary Moffet was invited to return alongside his bandmates, but chose to remain "committed to his record production business". The band released Attitude in 1993 and Frigate in 1994, before Segal left during 1995. The remaining members released Back to the Mansion in 2001, the tour for which introduced former Coney Hatch and the Guess Who frontman Carl Dixon in Segal's place. Dixon remained with April Wine for three touring cycles, leaving in early 2004 to return to the Guess Who.

Back to a four-piece lineup, April Wine released Roughly Speaking in 2006, before Clench left at the end of the year to "pursue other interests", replaced the following January by Breen LeBoeuf. In November 2008, Mercer also left the band, reportedly after "conflicts with lead singer Myles Goodwyn became unbearable". Blair Mackay took over on drums from January 2009. The new members did not last long, however — LeBoeuf was replaced in July 2011 by Ray Lanthier, while Mackay was replaced in March 2012 by Roy "Nip" Nichol. This lineup remained stable for over ten years, before Goodwyn announced in December 2022 that he would be stepping down from touring due to ongoing health issues, with Marc Parent taking his place. Goodwyn played his last show in March 2023, before he died on December 3, 2023.

== Members ==
=== Current ===
Image	Name	Years active	Instruments	Release contributions
	Brian Greenway	1977–1985; 1992–present	guitar; harmonica; backing and lead vocals	all April Wine releases from First Glance (1978) onwards
	Richard Lanthier	2011–present	bass; backing vocals	none to date
	Roy "Nip" Nichol	2012–present	drums; percussion; backing vocals	none to date
	Marc Parent	2022–present	lead and backing vocals; guitar	none to date

=== Former ===
Image	Name	Years active	Instruments	Release contributions
	Myles Goodwyn	1969–1985; 1992–2023 (died 2023)	lead and backing vocals; guitar; keyboards	all April Wine releases from April Wine (1971) to Alive in America (2023)
	David Henman	1969–1973	guitar; backing and lead vocals	April Wine (1971); On Record (1972); Electric Jewels (1973)
	Ritchie Henman	1969–1973	drums; percussion; keyboards	April Wine (1971); On Record (1972); Electric Jewels (1973)
	Jim Henman	1969–1971	lead and backing vocals; bass	April Wine (1971)
	Jim Clench	1971–1975; 1992–2006 (died 2010)	bass; backing and lead vocals	On Record (1972); Electric Jewels (1973); Live! (1974); Stand Back (1975); Attitude (1993); Frigate (1994); Back to the Mansion (2001); Greatest Hits Live 2003 (2003); Roughly Speaking (2006)
	Jerry Mercer	1973–1984; 1992–2008	drums; percussion; backing vocals	all April Wine releases from Electric Jewels (1973) to One for the Road (1985), and from Attitude (1993) to Alive in America (2023)
	Gary Moffet	1973–1984	guitar; backing vocals	all April Wine releases from Electric Jewels (1973) to One for the Road (1985); Greatest Hits Live (1999); Alive in America (2023)
	Steve Lang	1975–1984 (died 2017)	bass; backing vocals	all April Wine releases from The Whole World's Goin' Crazy (1976) to One for the Road (1985); Greatest Hits Live (1999); Alive in America (2023)
	Jean Pellerin	1985 (session members only)	bass	Walking Through Fire (1986)
	Marty Simon	1985 (session members only)	drums	Walking Through Fire (1986)
	Daniel Barbe	1985 (session members only)	keyboards	Walking Through Fire (1986)
	Steve Segal	1992–1994 (died 2024)	guitar	Attitude (1993); Frigate (1994)
	Carl Dixon	2001–2004	guitar; keyboards; backing vocals	Greatest Hits Live 2003 (2003)
	Breen LeBoeuf	2007–2011	bass; backing vocals	none
	Blair Mackay	2009–2012	drums; percussion; backing vocals	none

== Lineups ==
Period	Members	Releases
Late 1969–October 1971	Myles Goodwyn — guitar, lead and backing vocals; David Henman — guitar, lead and backing vocals; Jim Henman — bass, lead and backing vocals; Ritchie Henman — drums, percussion, keyboards	April Wine (1971)
October 1971–September 1973	Myles Goodwyn — lead vocals, guitar, keyboards; David Henman — guitar, backing vocals; Jim Clench — bass, backing and lead vocals; Ritchie Henman — drums, percussion, keyboards	On Record (1972)
September 1973–fall 1975	Myles Goodwyn — lead vocals, guitar, keyboards; Gary Moffet — guitar, backing vocals; Jim Clench — bass, backing and lead vocals; Jerry Mercer — drums, percussion, backing vocals	Electric Jewels (1973); Live! (1974); Stand Back (1975)
Fall 1975–August 1977	Myles Goodwyn — lead vocals, guitar, keyboards; Gary Moffet — guitar, backing vocals; Steve Lang — bass, backing vocals; Jerry Mercer — drums, percussion, backing vocals	The Whole World's Goin' Crazy (1976); Forever for Now (1977); Live at the El Mocambo (1977)
August 1977–July 1984	Myles Goodwyn — lead and backing vocals, guitar, keyboards; Gary Moffet — guitar, backing vocals; Brian Greenway — guitar, harmonica, lead and backing vocals; Steve Lang — bass, backing vocals; Jerry Mercer — drums, percussion, backing vocals	First Glance (1978); Harder ... Faster (1979); The Nature of the Beast (1981); Live in London (1981); Power Play (1982); Animal Grace (1984); One for the Road (1985); Greatest Hits Live (1999); Alive in America (2023)
1985 (temporary session lineup)	Myles Goodwyn — lead and backing vocals, guitar, keyboards; Brian Greenway — guitar, harmonica, lead and backing vocals; Jean Pellerin — bass (session member); Marty Simon — drums (session member); Daniel Barbe — keyboards (session member)	Walking Through Fire (1985)
Band inactive 1985–1992
Summer 1992–early 1995	Myles Goodwyn — lead and backing vocals, guitar, keyboards; Brian Greenway — guitar, harmonica, lead and backing vocals; Steve Segal — guitar; Jim Clench — bass, backing vocals; Jerry Mercer — drums, percussion, backing vocals	Attitude (1993); Frigate (1994)
Early 1995–early 2001	Myles Goodwyn — lead and backing vocals, guitar, keyboards; Brian Greenway — guitar, harmonica, lead and backing vocals; Jim Clench — bass, backing vocals; Jerry Mercer — drums, percussion, backing vocals	Back to the Mansion (2001)
Early 2001–early 2004	Myles Goodwyn — lead and backing vocals, guitar, keyboards; Brian Greenway — guitar, harmonica, lead and backing vocals; Carl Dixon — guitar, keyboards, backing vocals; Jim Clench — bass, backing vocals; Jerry Mercer — drums, percussion, backing vocals	Greatest Hits Live 2003 (2003)
Early 2004–late 2006	Myles Goodwyn — lead and backing vocals, guitar, keyboards; Brian Greenway — guitar, harmonica, lead and backing vocals; Jim Clench — bass, backing vocals; Jerry Mercer — drums, percussion, backing vocals	Roughly Speaking (2006)
January 2007–November 2008	Myles Goodwyn — lead and backing vocals, guitar, keyboards; Brian Greenway — guitar, harmonica, lead and backing vocals; Breen LeBoeuf — bass, backing vocals; Jerry Mercer — drums, percussion, backing vocals	none
January 2009–July 2011	Myles Goodwyn — lead and backing vocals, guitar, keyboards; Brian Greenway — guitar, harmonica, lead and backing vocals; Breen LeBouef — bass, backing vocals; Blair Mackay — drums, percussion, backing vocals	none
July 2011–March 2012	Myles Goodwyn — lead and backing vocals, guitar, keyboards; Brian Greenway — guitar, harmonica, lead and backing vocals; Richard Lanthier — bass, backing vocals; Blair Mackay — drums, percussion, backing vocals	none
March 2012–December 2022	Myles Goodwyn — lead and backing vocals, guitar, keyboards; Brian Greenway — guitar, harmonica, lead and backing vocals; Richard Lanthier — bass, backing vocals; Roy Nichol — drums, percussion, backing vocals	none
December 2022–March 2023	Marc Parent — lead and backing vocals, guitar; Myles Goodwyn — lead and backing vocals, guitar (part-time); Brian Greenway — guitar, harmonica, lead and backing vocals; Richard Lanthier — bass, backing vocals; Roy Nichol — drums, percussion, backing vocals	none
March 2023–present	Marc Parent — lead and backing vocals, guitar; Brian Greenway — guitar, harmonica, lead and backing vocals; Richard Lanthier — bass, backing vocals; Roy Nichol — drums, percussion, backing vocals	none to date
