= The Best of April Wine: Rock Ballads =

Greatest hits album by April Wine
- Released: 1981
- Genre: Soft rock
- Label: Aquarius
- Producer: See: various producers

April Wine chronology
The Nature of the Beast (1981)	The Best of April Wine: Rock Ballads (1981)	Review and Preview (1981)

The Best of April Wine: Rock Ballads is a compilation album by Canadian rock band April Wine, released in 1981.

== Track listing ==
1. "Just Between You and Me"
2. "Child's Garden"
3. "Like a Lover, Like a Song"
4. "You Won't Dance with Me"
5. "I Wouldn't Want to Lose Your Love"
6. "Rock n' Roll is a Vicious Game"
7. "Cum Hear the Band"
8. "Comin' Right Down on Top of Me"
9. "Marjorie"
10. "I'm on Fire for You Baby" (David Elliott)
11. "Lovin' You"
12. "Wings of Love"

== Track listing (CD reissue) ==
1. "Just Between You and Me"
2. "Child's Garden"
3. "Like a Lover, Like a Song"
4. "You Won't Dance with Me"
5. "I Wouldn't Want to Lose Your Love"
6. "Rock n' Roll is a Vicious Game"
7. "Comin' Right Down on Top of Me"
8. "Marjorie"
9. "Lovin' You"
10. "Wings of Love"

== Personnel ==
- Myles Goodwyn – lead & background vocals, guitar, keyboards
- Brian Greenway – vocals, guitar, harmonica
- Gary Moffet – guitar, background vocals
- Jim Clench – vocals, bass on "I Wouldn't Want To Loose Your Love" & "I'm On Fire For You Baby"
- Steve Lang – bass, background vocals
- Jerry Mercer – drums & percussion, background vocals

=== Various producers ===
- Myles Goodwyn – producer
- Mike Stone – producer
- Gene Cornish – producer
- Dino Danelli – producer
- Doug Morris – producer

== Certifications ==
Region	Certification	Certified units/sales
Canada (Music Canada)	Gold	50,000^{^}
^{^} Shipments figures based on certification alone.
