= Best of April Wine =

Best of April Wine: Studio

Greatest hits album by April Wine
- Released: November 18, 2003
- Genre: Rock
- Label: MCA
- Producer: See various producers

April Wine chronology
Greatest Hits Live 2003 (2003)	Best of April Wine: Studio (2003)	From the Front Row ... Live! (2003)

Professional ratings
Review scores
Source	Rating
Allmusic	2.5/5 stars

Best of April Wine is a compilation album by the Canadian rock band April Wine, released in 2003.

== Track listing ==
All tracks written by Myles Goodwyn unless otherwise noted.

1. "I Like to Rock"
2. "Roller"
3. "Just Between You and Me"
4. "All Over Town"
5. "Say Hello"
6. "Oowatanite" (J. Clench)
7. "Enough is Enough"
8. "Tonite is a Wonderful Time to Fall in Love"
9. "You Won't Dance with Me"
10. "Anything You Want, You Got It"
11. "I Wouldn't Want to Lose Your Love"
12. "Rock n' Roll is a Vicious Game"

== Personnel ==
- Myles Goodwyn – lead & background vocals, guitar, keyboards
- Brian Greenway – vocals, guitar, harmonica
- Gary Moffet – guitar, background vocals
- Jim Clench – vocals, bass
- Steve Lang – bass, background vocals
- Jerry Mercer – drums & percussion, background vocals

=== Various producers ===
- Myles Goodwyn – producer
- Nick Blagona – producer
- Mike Stone – producer
- Gene Cornish – producer
- Dino Danelli – producer
