= Live in London (April Wine video) =

- DVD packaging, 2008 release

Video by April Wine
- Released: 1981
- Recorded: Hammersmith Odeon, London, January 27, 1981
- Genre: Rock, hard rock
- Length: 66:00
- Label: Thorn EMI, Aquarius, Capitol
- Director: Derek Burbidge
- Producer: Myles Goodwyn, Mike Stone

Original cover-art
- Original (1981) laserdisc packaging

April Wine album chronology
The Nature of the Beast (1981)	Live in London (1981)	Power Play (1982)

April Wine DVD chronology
Live in London (1981)	From the Front Row ... Live! (2003)

Professional ratings
Review scores
Source	Rating
AllMusic	2.5/5 stars

Live in London is a live concert video by Canadian rock band April Wine, filmed at the Hammersmith Odeon in London, England, on January 27, 1981. This video was first released in 1981 on VHS and BETA format by Thorn EMI, and also on Pioneer Laserdisc in co-operation with Capitol Records and Aquarius Records, Canada. Live in London was also officially release on DVD by Cherry Red Records, on May 13, 2008.

The Live in London video showcases April Wine in concert at the peak of their career, with a full stage, lighting, and pyrotechnics show.

== Track listing ==
All tracks written by Myles Goodwyn unless otherwise noted.

1. "Big City Girls"
2. "Crash and Burn"
3. "Tellin’ Me Lies"
4. "Future Tense"
5. "Ladies Man"
6. "Caught in the Crossfire"
7. "Sign of the Gypsy Queen" (Lorence Hud)
8. "Just Between You and Me"
9. "Bad Boys"
10. "One More Time"
11. "21st Century Schizoid Man" (R. Fripp, M. Giles, G. Lake, I. McDonald, P. Sinfield)
12. "Roller"
13. "I Like to Rock"
14. "All Over Town"
15. "Wanna Rock"

== Track listing (Laserdisc version) ==
All tracks written by Myles Goodwyn unless otherwise noted.

1. "Big City Girls"
2. "Crash and Burn"
3. "Tellin’ Me Lies"
4. "Future Tense"
5. "Ladies Man"
6. "Sign of the Gypsy Queen" (Lorence Hud)
7. "Just Between You and Me"
8. "Bad Boys"
9. "One More Time"
10. "Roller"
11. "I Like to Rock"
12. "All Over Town"
13. "Wanna Rock"

== Personnel ==
- Myles Goodwyn – vocals, guitars
- Brian Greenway – vocals, guitars
- Gary Moffet – guitars, background vocals
- Steve Lang – bass, background vocals
- Jerry Mercer – drums
- Directed by – Derek Burbidge
- Audio mix by – Myles Goodwyn and Mike Stone for Aquarius Records
