= The Hits (April Wine album) =

Greatest hits album by April Wine
- Released: 1987
- Genre: Rock
- Length: 70:20
- Label: Aquarius, Capitol
- Producer: See various producers

April Wine chronology
All the Rockers (1987)	The Hits (1987)	We Like to Rock (1988)

Professional ratings
Review scores
Source	Rating
Allmusic	4.5/5 stars

The Hits is a Compilation album by the Canadian rock band April Wine, released in 1987. The picture used on this cover is also used on the album covers of First Glance (1978) (American version only), Greatest Hits (1979), and Classic Masters (2002).

== Track listing ==
All tracks written by Myles Goodwyn unless otherwise noted.

1. "Say Hello" – 2:59
2. "Enough is Enough" – 4:03
3. "Just Between You and Me" – 3:55
4. "Roller" – 3:36
5. "Love Has Remembered Me" – 4:08
6. "This Could Be the Right One" – 4:08
7. "Sign of the Gypsy Queen" (Lorence Hud) – 4:15
8. "What If We Fall in Love" – 4:18
9. "Rock Myself to Sleep" (Kimberley Rew, Vince de la Cruz) – 2:57
10. "Doin' It Right" (Tom Lavin) – 3:38
11. "Tell Me Why" (John Lennon, Paul McCartney) – 3:15
12. "Tonite is a Wonderful Time to Fall in Love" – 3:37
13. "I'm on Fire for You Baby" (David Elliott) (1974 single) – 3:27
14. "You Could Have Been a Lady" (Errol Brown, Tony Wilson) – 3:21
15. "Rock n' Roll Is a Vicious Game" – 3:16
16. "Like a Lover, Like a Song" – 5:07
17. "You Won't Dance with Me" – 3:43
18. "Fast Train" – 3:21
19. "I Wouldn't Want to Lose Your Love" – 3:09

== Personnel ==
- Myles Goodwyn – lead & background vocals, guitar, keyboards
- Brian Greenway – guitar, vocals, harmonica
- Gary Moffet – guitar, vocals
- David Henman – guitar, vocals
- Steve Lang – bass, background vocals
- Jean Pellerin – bass (on tracks 5 and 9)
- Jim Clench – bass, vocals
- Jim Henman – bass, vocals, acoustic guitar
- Jerry Mercer – drums & percussion, background vocals
- Marty Simon – drums (on tracks 5 and 9)
- Ritchie Henman – percussion, keyboards
- Daniel Barbe – keyboards (on tracks 5 and 9)

=== Various producers ===
- Myles Goodwyn – producer
- Mike Stone – producer
- Nick Blagona – producer
- Lance Quinn – producer
- Doug Morris – producer
- Gene Cornish – producer
- Dino Danelli – producer
- Ralph Murphy – producer
- Bill Hill – producer

== Certifications ==
Region	Certification	Certified units/sales
Canada (Music Canada)	Platinum	100,000^{^}
^{^} Shipments figures based on certification alone.
