= Greatest Hits (April Wine album) =

Greatest hits album by April Wine
- Released: 1979
- Genre: Hard rock
- Length: 47:25
- Label: Aquarius
- Producer: See Various producers

April Wine chronology
First Glance (1978)	Greatest Hits (1979)	Harder ... Faster (1979)

Professional ratings
Review scores
Source	Rating
Allmusic	3/5 stars

Greatest Hits is a compilation album by Canadian rock band April Wine released in 1979. The picture on this album cover is also used on three other albums First Glance (1978) (American version only), The Hits (1987), and Classic Masters (2002).

== Track listing ==
All tracks written by Myles Goodwyn unless otherwise noted.

1. "Fast Train" – 2:39
2. "Drop Your Guns" (D. Henman) – 3:31
3. "Weeping Widow" (Robert Wright, AKA. Art La King) – 3:53
4. "Rock 'n' Roll Is a Vicious Game" – 3:22
5. "Oowatanite" (J. Clench) – 3:35
6. "You Could Have Been a Lady" (Errol Brown, Tony Wilson) – 3:20
7. "Roller" – 3:34
8. "Like a Lover, Like a Song" – 3:46
9. "I'm on Fire for You Baby" (David Elliott) – 3:29
10. "Lady Run, Lady Hide" (J. Clench, M. Goodwyn) – 2:57
11. "Bad Side of the Moon" (Elton John, Bernie Taupin) – 3:12
12. "I Wouldn't Want to Lose Your Love" – 3:07
13. "You Won't Dance with Me" – 3:42
14. "Tonite Is a Wonderful Time to Fall in Love" – 3:18

== Personnel ==
- Myles Goodwyn – lead & background vocals, guitar, keyboards
- Jim Henman – vocals, bass, acoustic guitar
- Jim Clench – vocals, bass
- Steve Lang – bass, background vocals
- David Henman – vocals, guitar
- Gary Moffet – guitar, background vocals
- Brian Greenway – vocals, guitar, harmonica
- Ritchie Henman – percussion
- Jerry Mercer – drums & percussion, background vocals

=== Various producers ===
- Bill Hill – producer
- Ralph Murphy – producer
- Gene Cornish – producer
- Dino Danelli – producer
- Myles Goodwyn – producer
- Doug Morris – producer

== Charts ==
Chart (1979)	Peak position
Canada Top Albums/CDs (RPM)	76

== Certifications ==
Region	Certification	Certified units/sales
Canada (Music Canada)	2× Platinum	200,000^{^}
^{^} Shipments figures based on certification alone.
