= Classic Masters (April Wine album) =

Greatest hits album by April Wine
- Released: March 26, 2002
- Genre: Rock; blues rock; hard rock
- Label: Capitol; MCA
- Producer: See various producers

April Wine chronology
Back to the Mansion (2001)	Classic Masters (2002)	I Like to Rock (2002)

Professional ratings
Review scores
Source	Rating
Allmusic	4/5 stars

Classic Masters is a compilation album by Canadian rock band April Wine, released in 2002. The album cover is a reprint of the albums First Glance (1978) (American version only), The Hits (1987), and Greatest Hits (1979).

== Track listing ==
All tracks are written by Myles Goodwyn, unless otherwise noted

No.	Title	Writer(s)	Length
1.	"Roller"		4:19
2.	"Get Ready for Love"		4:21
3.	"Say Hello"		2:58
4.	"I Like to Rock"		4:18
5.	"Tonite"		4:04
6.	"Just Between You and Me"		3:55
7.	"Sign of the Gypsy Queen"	Lorence Hud	4:16
8.	"Enough is Enough"		4:05
9.	"Tell Me Why"	John Lennon, Paul McCartney	3:16
10.	"This Could Be the Right One"		4:03
11.	"21st Century Schizoid Man"	Robert Fripp, Michael Giles, Greg Lake, Ian McDonald, Peter Sinfield	6:26
12.	"Love Has Remembered Me"		4:08
Total length:			50:15

== Personnel ==
=== April Wine ===
- Myles Goodwyn – lead vocals, guitar, keyboards
- Brian Greenway – vocals, rhythm guitar
- Gary Moffet – lead guitar, background vocals
- Steve Lang – bass, background vocals
- Jerry Mercer – drums, background vocals

=== Production ===
- Myles Goodwyn – producer
- Nick Blagona – producer
- Mike Stone – producer
- Lance Quinn – producer
- Bryan Kelley – producer
- Cheryl Pawelski – producer, compilation
