= Rock Champions (April Wine album) =

Greatest hits album by April Wine
- Released: 2000
- Recorded: Le Studio, Le Manoir Studios
- Genre: Rock, hard rock
- Label: MCA
- Producer: Myles Goodwyn, Mike Stone, Nick Blagona

April Wine chronology
Greatest Hits Live 1997 (1997)	Rock Champions (2000)	Back to the Mansion (2001)

Rock Champions is a compilation album by Canadian rock band April Wine, released in 2000.

== Track listing ==
All tracks written by Myles Goodwyn unless otherwise noted.

1. "I Like to Rock"
2. "Just Between You and Me"
3. "Babes in Arms"
4. "Tonite"
5. "All Over Town"
6. "Say Hello"
7. "Too Hot to Handle"
8. "Crash and Burn"
9. "Caught in the Crossfire"
10. "Better Do it Well" (M. Goodwyn, G. Moffet)
11. "Big City Girls"
12. "Bad Boys"
13. "21st Century Schizoid Man" (R. Fripp, M. Giles, G. Lake, I. McDonald, P. Sinfield)
14. "Wanna Rock"

== Personnel ==
- Myles Goodwyn – vocals, guitars, keyboards
- Brian Greenway – vocals, guitars
- Gary Moffet – guitars, background vocals
- Steve Lang – bass, background vocals
- Jerry Mercer – drums, background vocals
