= I Like to Rock =

Live album by April Wine
- Released: 2002
- Recorded: 11 November 1982 (in Wichita, Kansas)
- Genre: Rock, hard rock
- Length: 65:19
- Label: Disky
- Producer: Joe Pheifer

April Wine chronology
Classic Masters (2002)	I Like to Rock (2002)	Greatest Hits Live 2003 (2003)

I Like to Rock is a live album by the Canadian rock band April Wine, released in 2002. This disc is a compilation of previously released live recordings from the 1997 King Biscuit Flower Hour album (also known as April Wine Greatest Hits Live 1997). It was recorded on 13 September 1982, at the Kansas Coliseum in Wichita, Kansas.

== Track listing ==
All tracks written by Myles Goodwyn unless otherwise noted.

1. "21st Century Schizoid Man" (R. Fripp, M. Giles, G. Lake, I. McDonald, P. Sinfield) – 5:12
2. "Crash and Burn" – 3:51
3. "Enough is Enough" – 4:23
4. "Just Between You and Me" – 3:53
5. "If You See Kay" (David Freeland) – 4:33
6. "Sign of the Gypsy Queen" (Lorence Hud) – 6:44
7. "Future Tense" – 4:19
8. "Anything You Want" – 6:57
9. "Waiting on a Miracle" – 5:03
10. "I Like to Rock" – 3:15
11. "Roller" – 4:40
12. "All Over Town" – 3:22
13. "Before the Dawn" (B. Greenway) – 4:40
14. "Oowatanite" (J. Clench) – 4:27

== Personnel ==
- Myles Goodwyn – lead & background vocals, guitars
- Brian Greenway – vocals, guitars
- Gary Moffet – guitars, background vocals
- Steve Lang – bass, background vocals
- Jerry Mercer – drums, background vocals
