= We Like to Rock =

Greatest hits album by April Wine
- Released: 1988
- Recorded: Le Studio
- Genres: Rock, hard rock
- Length: 33:28
- Labels: Aquarius, Capitol
- Producers: Myles Goodwyn, Nick Blagona

April Wine chronology
The Hits (1987)	We Like to Rock (1988)	The First Decade (1989)

Professional ratings
Review scores
Source	Rating
AllMusic	2.5/5 stars

We Like to Rock is a compilation album by the Canadian rock band April Wine, released in 1988. It is a repackaging for the U.S. market of the 1979 album Harder.....Faster with a reordering of the songs and a different cover.

== Track listing ==
All tracks written by Myles Goodwyn unless otherwise noted.

1. "I Like to Rock" – 3:41
2. "21st Century Schizoid Man" (R. Fripp, M. Giles, G. Lake, I. McDonald, P. Sinfield) – 6:49
3. "Babes in Arms" – 3:26
4. "Say Hello" – 3:10
5. "Before the Dawn" (B. Greenway) – 4:37
6. "Better Do it Well" (M. Goodwyn, G. Moffet) – 3:48
7. "Tonite" – 4:07
8. "Ladies Man" – 3:50

== Personnel ==
- Myles Goodwyn – vocals, guitars
- Brian Greenway – vocals, guitars
- Gary Moffet – guitars, background vocals
- Steve Lang – bass, background vocals
- Jerry Mercer – drums, background vocals
