= All the Rockers =

Greatest hits album by April Wine
- Released: 1987
- Genre: Rock, hard rock
- Length: 68:39
- Label: Aquarius, Capitol
- Producer: See various producers

April Wine chronology
| Walking Through Fire (1986) | All the Rockers (1987) | The Hits (1987) |

Professional ratings
Review scores
| Source | Rating |
|---|---|
| Allmusic | 3/5 stars |

All the Rockers is a compilation album by the rock band April Wine. The tracks cover the main touring years from 1973 to 1983.

== Track listing ==
All tracks written by Myles Goodwyn unless otherwise noted.

1. "Anything You Want, You Got It" – 4:42
2. "I Like to Rock" – 4:30
3. "Roller" – 4:17
4. "All Over Town" – 2:55
5. "Hot on the Wheels of Love" (M. Goodwyn, S. Lang) – 3:11
6. "Tonite" – 4:11
7. "Future Tense" – 4:08
8. "21st Century Schizoid Man" (R. Fripp, M. Giles, G. Lake, I. McDonald, P. Sinfield) – 6:24
9. "Crash and Burn" – 2:32
10. "Oowatanite" (J. Clench) – 3:50
11. "Don't Push Me Around" – 3:14
12. "Get Ready for Love" – 4:14
13. "Tellin' Me Lies" – 3:01
14. "Blood Money" – 5:22
15. "Gimme Love" (M. Goodwyn, Hovaness "Johnny" Hagopian) – 3:58
16. "Weeping Widow" (Robert Wright, AKA. Art La King) – 3:53
17. "Victim for Your Love" – 4:17

== Personnel ==
- Myles Goodwyn – vocals, guitar, keyboards
- Steve Lang – bass, background vocals
- Jim Clench – bass, vocals
- Brian Greenway – guitar, vocals
- Jerry Mercer – drums & percussion, background vocals
- Gary Moffet – guitar, background vocals

=== Various producers ===
- Myles Goodwyn – producer
- Mike Stone – producer
- Nick Blagona – producer
- Gene Cornish – producer
- Dino Danelli – producer
- Ralph Murphy – producer
