= April Wine Rocks! =

Greatest hits album by April Wine
- Released: October 31, 2006
- Genre: Rock, hard rock
- Label: Aquarius
- Producer: See various producers

April Wine chronology
From the Front Row ... Live! (2003)	April Wine Rocks! (2006)	Roughly Speaking (2006)

Professional ratings
Review scores
Source	Rating
Allmusic	3.5/5 stars

April Wine Rocks! is a compilation album by the Canadian rock band April Wine, released in 2006, which features songs recorded during their time on the Aquarius Records label (1971–1986).

== Track listing ==
All tracks written by Myles Goodwyn unless otherwise noted.

1. "Hot on the Wheels of Love" (M. Goodwyn, S. Lang)
2. "Tonite"
3. "Future Tense"
4. "21st Century Schizoid Man" (R. Fripp, M. Giles, G. Lake, I. McDonald, P. Sinfield)
5. "Crash and Burn"
6. "Oowatanite" (J. Clench)
7. "Get Ready for Love"
8. "Tellin’ Me Lies"
9. "Don’t Push Me Around"
10. "Gimme Love" (M. Goodwyn, Hovaness "Johnny" Hagopian)
11. "I Like to Rock (Live)"

== Personnel ==
- Myles Goodwyn – vocals, guitar
- Jim Clench – bass, vocals
- Steve Lang – bass, background vocals
- Brian Greenway – guitars, vocals
- Gary Moffet – guitars, background vocals
- Jerry Mercer – drums & percussion, background vocals

=== Various producers ===
- Myles Goodwyn – producer
- Nick Blagona – producer
- Mike Stone – producer
- Gene Cornish – producer
- Dino Danelli – producer
