= Greatest Hits Live (April Wine album) =

Live album by April Wine
- Released: 1999
- Recorded: Davenport, November 21, 1982
- Venue: at Palmer Auditorium
- Genre: Rock
- Label: MCA
- Producer: Joe Pheifer

April Wine chronology
Champions of Rock (1996)	Greatest Hits Live (1999)	Rock Champions (2000)

Alternative cover
- 2003 reissue / repackaging

Professional ratings
Review scores
Source	Rating
Allmusic	2.5/5 stars

Greatest Hits Live is a live album by the Canadian rock band April Wine, released in 1999. Also known as King Biscuit Flower Hour, but this is the label it was released under.

== Track listing ==
All tracks written by Myles Goodwyn unless otherwise noted.

1. "Anything You Want"
2. "Future Tense"
3. "Crash and Burn"
4. "Before the Dawn" (B. Greenway)
5. "Waiting on a Miracle"
6. "Enough is Enough"
7. "If You See Kay" (David Freeland)
8. "Just Between You and Me"
9. "Sign of the Gypsy Queen" (Lorence Hud)
10. "21st Century Schizoid Man" (R. Fripp, M. Giles, G. Lake, I. McDonald, P. Sinfield)
11. "I Like to Rock"
12. "Roller"
13. "Oowatanite" (J. Clench)
14. "All Over Town"
15. "You Could Have Been a Lady" (Errol Brown, Tony Wilson) *Bonus Track

== Personnel ==
- Myles Goodwyn – lead & background vocals, guitars
- Brian Greenway – vocals, guitars
- Gary Moffet – guitars, background vocals
- Steve Lang – bass, background vocals
- Jerry Mercer – drums, background vocals
