= Live! (April Wine album) =

Live album by April Wine
- Released: 1974
- Recorded: QEH Auditorium, Halifax
- Genre: Hard rock
- Length: 48:17
- Label: Aquarius
- Producers: Gene Cornish, Dino Danelli

April Wine chronology
Electric Jewels (1973)	Live! (1974)	Stand Back (1975)

Live! is the first live album by the Canadian rock band April Wine. It was released in 1974. The album was recorded in the auditorium of Queen Elizabeth High School in Halifax, Nova Scotia.

== Track listing ==
All tracks written by Myles Goodwyn and Jim Clench unless noted otherwise.

1. "(Mama) It's True" – 6:15
2. "Druthers" – 4:36
3. "Cat's Claw" – 5:20
4. "I'm on Fire for You Baby" (David Elliott) – 4:06
5. "The Band Has Just Begun" – 3:21
6. "Good Fibes" (J. Mercer) – 4:33
7. "Just Like That" – 7:16
8. "You Could Have Been a Lady" (Errol Brown, Tony Wilson) – 3:52

== Personnel ==
- Myles Goodwyn – guitar, lead vocals
- Jim Clench – bass guitar, lead vocals on "Cat's Claw"
- Gary Moffet – guitar, vocals
- Jerry Mercer – percussion, vocals
