= One for the Road (April Wine album) =

Live album by April Wine
- Released: 1985
- Recorded: 1984
- Genre: Hard rock
- Length: 37:48
- Label: Aquarius, Capitol, EMI
- Producer: Myles Goodwyn, Mike Stone

April Wine chronology
Animal Grace (1984)	One for the Road (1985)	Walking Through Fire (1986)

One for the Road is a live album by Canadian rock band April Wine, recorded during their "One More for the Road" tour in 1984 in support of their Animal Grace (1984) album.

== Track listing ==
All tracks written by Myles Goodwyn unless otherwise noted.

1. "Anything You Want, You Got It" – 4:05
2. "I Like to Rock" – 3:56
3. "All Over Town" – 3:06
4. "Just Between You and Me" – 3:43
5. "Enough is Enough" – 3:47
6. "This Could be the Right One" – 4:16
7. "Sign of the Gypsy Queen" (Lorence Hud) – 5:11
8. "Like a Lover, Like a Song" – 4:55
9. "Comin' Right Down on Top of Me"
10. "Rock n' Roll is a Vicious Game" – 4:56
11. "Roller" – 4:16

== Personnel ==
- Myles Goodwyn – vocals, guitars, keyboards
- Gary Moffet – guitars, background vocals
- Steve Lang – bass, background vocals
- Brian Greenway – vocals, guitars
- Jerry Mercer – drums
