= Roughly Speaking =

Roughly Speaking may refer to:

- Roughly Speaking (album)
- Roughly Speaking (film)
