= Live at the El Mocambo (April Wine album) =

1977 live album by April Wine

Live album by April Wine
- Released: 1977
- Recorded: March 4th & 5th, 1977.
- Venue: El Mocambo club, Toronto
- Genre: Rock, Style: Pop rock & Arena rock
- Length: 39:17
- Label: Aquarius, London
- Producer: Eddie Kramer

April Wine chronology
Forever for Now (1977)	Live at the El Mocambo (1977)	First Glance (1978)

Professional ratings
Review scores
Source	Rating
AllMusic	2/5 stars

Live at the El Mocambo is the second live album by the Canadian rock band April Wine, released in 1977.

== Overview ==
The album was recorded during performances at El Mocambo club on 4 and 5 March 1977 when April Wine opened for The Rolling Stones during one of the surprise club appearances for which the Stones are renowned, and during which they recorded part of their own live album Love You Live (1977).

Live at the El Mocambo was produced and engineered by Eddie Kramer, who is best known for his work with The Rolling Stones, Jimi Hendrix and Led Zeppelin.

== Track listing ==
Side one:

1. "Teenage Love" – (Bob Segarini) – 3:36
2. "Tonite is a Wonderful Time to Fall in Love" – (Myles Goodwyn) – 4:01
3. "Juvenile Delinquent" – (B. Segarini) – 4:53
4. "Don't Push Me Around" – (M. Goodwyn) – 6:19

Side two:

1. "Oowatanite" – (Jim Clench) – 4:23
2. "Drop Your Guns" – (D. Henman) – 4:22
3. "Slow Poke" – (M. Goodwyn) – 4:30
4. "She's No Angel" – (M. Goodwyn, G. Moffet) – 3:25
5. "You Could Have Been a Lady" – (Errol Brown, T. Wilson) – 3:52

== Personnel ==
=== April Wine ===
- Myles Goodwyn – lead vocals, guitar
- Gary Moffet – guitar, background vocals
- Steve Lang – bass, background vocals, lead vocals on "Oowatanite"
- Jerry Mercer – drums, background vocals

=== Production ===
- Eddie Kramer – producer, engineer
- Myles Goodwyn – producer on "She's No Angel"
- George Marino – mastering
- Bob Lemm – design and illustration
