= Myles Goodwyn (album) =

Studio album by Myles Goodwyn
- Released: 1988
- Genre: Rock
- Length: 44:46
- Label: Aquarius, Atlantic
- Producer: Myles Goodwyn, Lance Quinn

Myles Goodwyn chronology
Myles Goodwyn (1988)	Myles Goodwyn And Friends of the Blues (2018)

Alternative cover
- Reissue

Myles Goodwyn is the debut studio album by Canadian musician Myles Goodwyn, who was the frontman and co-founder of the moderately successful and popular rock band April Wine. Released in 1988, two alternate versions of the album exist with a reissue having been released with different album cover art from that of the original. Another notable difference found on the reissued version was that "Sonya", track #4 on the original release, was retitled "My Girl"; the song's co-writer Jeff Paris had released the song as "My Girl" two years prior on his debut solo album, Race to Paradise. Tracks 8 and 9 are switched on the reissued version as well.

Singles from the album include: "My Girl", and "Do You Know What I Mean" (with background vocals provided by Lee Aaron).

== Track listing ==
All tracks written by Myles Goodwyn unless otherwise noted.

=== Original release ===
1. "Veil of Tears" – 4:23
2. "Do You Know What I Mean" (Lee Michaels) – 3:45
3. "Caviar" – 4:34
4. "Sonya" (Jeff Paris, Lenna Svajian) – 5:10
5. "Head On" (Goodwyn, Downing) – 4:58
6. "Face the Storm" – 4:24
7. "Frank Sinatra Can't Sing" (Goodwyn, Quinn) – 4:01
8. "Givin' It Up for Your Love" – 4:39
9. "Are You Still Loving Me" – 4:10
10. "Mama Won't Say (It's Good)" (Goodwyn, Quinn) – 4:42

=== Reissue ===
1. "Veil of Tears"
2. "Do You Know What I Mean" (Michaels)
3. "Caviar"
4. "My Girl" (Paris, Svajian)
5. "Head On" (Goodwyn, Downing)
6. "Face the Storm"
7. "Frank Sinatra Can't Sing" (Goodwyn, Quinn)
8. "Are You Still Loving Me"
9. "Givin' It Up for Your Love"
10. "Mama Won't Say (It's Good)" (Goodwyn, Quinn)

== Personnel ==
- Myles Goodwyn – vocals, guitars, keyboards, producer
- Jon Carin – keyboards & synth programming
- Gerry Cohen – keyboards & synth programming
- David Shaw – keyboards & synth programming
- Dave Rosenthal – keyboards & synth programming
- Kitten & The Cat – keyboards & synth programming
- Rob Rizzo – keyboards & synth programming
- Lance Quinn – guitars, producer, keyboards & synth programming
- Joe (Snake) Henchcliff – guitars
- Doug Gordon – guitars
- Jay Davidson – saxophone
- Rick Valente – harmonica
- Andy Newmark – drums (on Caviar)
- Lee Aaron – background vocals
- Ritchie Rubini – background vocals
- Rudy Rubini – background vocals
- Carol Brooks – background vocals
- Jeannie Brooks – background vocals
