= From the Front Row ... Live! =

From the Front Row ... Live

Live album by April Wine
- Released: 26 August 2003
- Genre: Rock, hard rock
- Label: MCA

April Wine chronology
Best of April Wine (2003)	From the Front Row ... Live (2003)	April Wine Rocks! (2006)

From the Front Row ... Live! is a live audio-DVD album by the Canadian rock band April Wine, released in 2003. As with all these 'From the Front Row ... Live!' releases this is a rehash of previously existing King Biscuit Flower Hour recordings with the track sequence rearranged. These recordings feature some of the band's hits. Released 2003 in Canada 2004 UK/US

== Track listing ==
All tracks written by Myles Goodwyn unless otherwise noted.

1. "21st Century Schizoid Man" (R. Fripp, M. Giles, G. Lake, I. McDonald, P. Sinfield)
2. "I Like to Rock"
3. "Roller"
4. "Sign of the Gypsy Queen" (Lorence Hud)
5. "Just Between You and Me"
6. "If You See Kay" (David Freeland)
7. "Enough is Enough"
8. "Waiting on a Miracle"
9. "Crash and Burn"
10. "Future Tense"
11. "Anything You Want, You Got It"
12. "You Could Have Been a Lady" (Errol Brown, Tony Wilson)
13. "All Over Town"
14. "Oowatanite" (J. Clench)
15. "Before the Dawn" (B. Greenway)

== Special features ==
24-bit, 96 kHz DVD Audio and 24-bit, 48 kHz Dolby Digital 5.1 options, stunning surround sound, plays on all DVD players, artist photos.

== Personnel ==
- Myles Goodwyn – lead & background vocals, guitars
- Brian Greenway – vocals, guitars
- Gary Moffet – guitars, background vocals
- Steve Lang – bass, background vocals
- Jerry Mercer – drums, background vocals
