= I Like to Rock (song) =

Single by April Wine

from the album Harder ... Faster
- B-side: "Ladies Man"
- Released: 1980
- Recorded: Le Studio
- Genre: Hard rock
- Length: 4:23
- Label: Aquarius, Capitol
- Songwriter: Myles Goodwyn
- Producers: Myles Goodwyn, Mike Stone, Brian Greenway

April Wine singles chronology
"Say Hello" (1980)	"I Like to Rock" (1980)	"Just Between You and Me" (1981)

Music video
- "I Like to Rock" on YouTube

"I Like to Rock" is a song by Canadian rock band April Wine written by lead singer and songwriter Myles Goodwyn. The song appears on the band's eighth studio album Harder ... Faster (1979) as the second single. The song features Myles Goodwyn's vocals over hard rock instrumentation.

The song was a moderate success when released in 1980, reaching #75 in Canada, #86 on the Billboard Hot 100, and #41 on the UK Singles Chart, their highest peak in the UK. It has gained substantial popularity internationally since the 1980s, becoming a mainstay of April Wine's setlist. The song is arguably the band's signature song, and has become a staple of classic rock and album-oriented rock radio stations in both the US and Canada

== Content ==
=== Song ===
The outro of the song includes the main guitar riffs to the Beatles' "Day Tripper" and the Rolling Stones' "(I Can't Get No) Satisfaction" played simultaneously, in tribute to these bands.

=== Lyrics ===
The lyrics of "I Like to Rock" refer to the singer's love of rock music, while the chorus says "I like to rock, some like it hot, baby". The lyrics also refer to partying late at night and singing in front of large crowds at concerts.

== Music video ==
The music video for "I Like to Rock" was directed by Brian Greenway, the band's main guitarist (who also directed the music videos for "Just Between You and Me" and "Enough Is Enough"), and features the band playing the song inside a recording studio located in the woods. The same location, Le Studio, would be used in the video for the song "Tom Sawyer" by fellow Canadian rock band Rush, in 1981.

== Charts ==
Chart (1981)	Peak position
US Billboard Hot 100	86
UK Singles Chart	41
Canada RPM Top Singles	75

== Accolades ==
- CKKQ-FM "the Q" ranked the song #65 on their list of the "150 Best Canadian Songs of All Time".
- Rock Klassics ranked it the 94th greatest Canadian rock song.

== In popular culture ==
"I Like to Rock" was used in the films Flower & Garnet, Gutterballs, High Life, and Drive Angry, as well as S1 E6 of Being Erica titled "Something Wrong With...", as well as the 2010 comedy television special Kids in the Hall: Death Comes to Town. The song was also mentioned in an episode of Trailer Park Boys titled "Closer to the Heart" in which main character Ricky repeatedly expresses that he prefers April Wine to fellow Canadian band Rush, and requests that Alex Lifeson perform "I Like to Rock", believing it is a Rush song.
