= Greatest Hits Live 2003 =

Live album by April Wine
- Released: 15 July 2003
- Genre: Rock
- Length: Disc 1) 65:55, disc 2) 43:29
- Label: Civilian, MCA
- Producer: April Wine

April Wine chronology
I Like to Rock (2002)	Greatest Hits Live 2003 (2003)	Best of April Wine (2003)

Greatest Hits Live 2003 is a live album by the Canadian rock band April Wine, released in 2003.

== Track listing ==
All tracks written by Myles Goodwyn unless otherwise noted.

1. "Oowatanite" (J. Clench) – 4:57
2. "Wanna Rock" – 2:40
3. "The Band Has Just Begun" (M. Goodwyn, J. Clench) – 4:14
4. "Say Hello" – 3:42
5. "Enough is Enough" – 3:20
6. "Before the Dawn" (B. Greenway) – 5:06
7. "Sign of the Gypsy Queen" (Lorence Hud) – 6:18
8. "Tonite is a Wonderful Time to Fall in Love" – 3:49
9. "Cum Hear the Band" – 3:53
10. "Won't Go There" – 3:30
11. "Victim for Your Love" – 4:31
12. "Weeping Widow" (Robert Wright, AKA. Art La King) – 7:11
13. "21st Century Schizoid Man" (R. Fripp, M. Giles, G. Lake, I. McDonald, P. Sinfield) – 12:44
14. "Like a Lover, Like a Song" – 5:18
15. "Rock n' Roll is a Vicious Game" – 4:17
16. "Holiday" (B. Greenway) – 4:12
17. "Bad Side of the Moon" (Elton John, Bernie Taupin) – 3:09
18. "All Over Town" – 3:26
19. "Roller" – 5:02
20. "Just Between You and Me" – 4:26
21. "I Like to Rock" – 5:20
22. "That's Who I Am, This is What I Do" – 2:45 – previously unreleased studio track
23. "Strong Silent Type" – 5:34 – previously unreleased studio track

== Personnel ==
- Myles Goodwyn – lead & background vocals, guitar
- Brian Greenway – vocals, guitars
- Jim Clench – vocals, bass
- Jerry Mercer – drums, background vocals
- Carl Dixon – guitar, keyboards
