= Teaze =

Canadian hard rock band

- Origin: Windsor, Ontario, Canada
- Genres: Hard rock
- Years active: 1974–1984, 2019–present
- Labels: Force One, Aquarius, Capitol, Unidisc, Heavy Metal America (EMI), Rock Candy
- Members: Brian Danter; Mark Bradac; Chuck Lambrick; Jim Bonventre
- Past members: Chuck Price; Mike Kozak

Teaze is a Canadian hard rock band formed in Windsor, Ontario in 1974. The band released four studio albums and a live album recorded in Japan. The band reformed in 2019.

== History ==
=== Early years ===
They were discovered by Mel Shaw, who produced several demos with the band to help them launch their career. The band and Shaw loved the songs so much that they decided to turn it in a full album. This LP was released with Force One Records, a division of London Records.

=== Aquarius years ===
Bob Rags, Terry Flood, Donald Tarlton (aka Donald K. Donald), and Aquarius Records discovered and signed Teaze with Aquarius Records They first saw the group at the famed RPM convention in Toronto Canada. The group was then purchased from Force One Records, Mel Shaw and then personal manager Stan Witcher. Their only hit single had been released with this label on their second album, On The Loose. It was a slow ballad called "Sweet Misery".

In 1977, they moved to Montreal and started touring all over US and Canada without getting much visibility. Their big break happened in September 1978, when they toured in Japan for ten days. The reception was so favourable that they recorded a live album there: Tour Of Japan.

When they returned to their new adopted hometown, they met Myles Goodwyn, leader of the band April Wine who was signed with Aquarius Records since the label's beginning. Goodwyn produced One Night Stands. The result of that album was a lot more serious than their first two releases. It was consequently their only U.S./worldwide release on Capitol/Aquarius Records. They also toured all around the world to spread their popularity, but without a lot of success.

Body Shots, the last record recorded by Teaze was produced by Nick Blagona, who some people hold responsible for the demise of the band. Body Shots did not produce any hits. Brian Danter left the group to pursue a religious calling, eventually becoming a pastor, and Aquarius Records and the band failed to find a suitable replacement. Aquarius Records lost interest in the band and decided to break the contract. The band split up at that time.

=== Aftermath ===
Myles Goodwyn produced two best-of compilations after Teaze's break-up. Those albums have also been released by Aquarius. One of these albums, A Taste Of Teaze became their best seller.

The song "Heartless World" from the album One Night Stands was featured in the 1997 Canadian horror anthology film Twists of Terror. In 2014, it also appeared in the Icelandic movie Málmhaus (aka Metalhead).

The band reformed in 2019 and were scheduled to perform live in Europe during 2020.

In 2026, Teaze released their first studio album in 46 years. Founding members Brian Danter and Mark Bradac are now joined by guitarist Chuck Lambrick and drummer Jim Bonventre

== Members ==
=== Current ===
- Brian Danter - Bass guitar and vocals
- Mark Bradac - Guitar
- Chuck Lambrick - Guitar
- Jim Bonventre - Drums

=== Past ===
- Chuck Price - Guitar
- Mike Kozak - Drums

== Discography ==
=== Studio Albums ===
- Teaze (1977)
- On The Loose (1978)
- One Night Stands (1979)
- Body Shots (1980)
- Rev Your Engines (2026)

=== Live Albums ===
- Tour Of Japan (1979)
- Live At Liege (2025)

=== Compilations ===
- A Taste Of Teaze (1981)
- Best Of Teaze (1990)
