= Tonite Is a Wonderful Time to Fall in Love =

Single by April Wine

from the album Stand Back
- B-side: "Highway Hard Run"
- Released: 1975
- Recorded: Tempo Studios
- Genre: Pop rock; soft rock
- Length: 3:35
- Label: Aquarius, Capitol
- Songwriter: Myles Goodwyn
- Producer: April Wine

April Wine singles chronology
"I Wouldn't Want to Lose Your Love" (1974)	"Tonite Is a Wonderful Time to Fall in Love" (1975)	"Cum, Here the Band" (1975)

"Tonite Is a Wonderful Time to Fall in Love" (sometimes spelt as "Tonight" rather than "Tonite") is a song by Canadian rock band April Wine. The song was written in 1974 by lead singer Myles Goodwyn and was released in 1975 as the second single from the band's album Stand Back (1975). The song was popular in Canada in 1975, peaking at number 5 on the Canadian Hot 100. It has remained one of April Wine's most popular songs.

== Content ==
"Tonite Is a Wonderful Time to Fall in Love" has a mid-range tempo, and simple lyrics that talk about a man and woman meeting for the first time at the beginning of summer, and the woman states to the man that "tonight is a wonderful time to fall in love".

== Covers ==
- The song was covered by the Trans-Canada Highwaymen for their 2023 album, Explosive Hits Vol. 1.

== Chart positions ==
=== Weekly charts ===
Chart (1975)	Peak position
Canada RPM 100	5

=== Year-end charts ===
Chart	Peak position
Canada RPM 100	7
