= The Whole World's Goin' Crazy =

Studio album by April Wine
- Released: September 1976
- Studios: Tempo Studios, Montreal
- Genre: Hard rock
- Length: 39:13
- Labels: Aquarius, London
- Producer: Myles Goodwyn

April Wine chronology
Stand Back (1975)	The Whole World's Goin' Crazy (1976)	Forever for Now (1977)

Professional ratings
Review scores
Source	Rating
AllMusic	2/5 stars
The Rolling Stone Record Guide	2/5 stars

The Whole World's Goin' Crazy is the fifth studio album by Canadian rock band April Wine, released in September 1976. With the release of this album Steve Lang had replaced Jim Clench on bass. It reached No. 1 in Canada on the RPM national album chart on May 8, 1976, and remained there for two weeks. The album was the first in Canadian history to have platinum advanced sales orders.

== Track listing ==
All tracks written by Myles Goodwyn unless otherwise noted.

=== Canadian release ===
1. "Gimme Love" (M. Goodwyn, Hovaness "Johnny" Hagopian) – 4:00
2. "So Bad" – 3:26
3. "Wings of Love" – 4:51
4. "We Can be More than We Are" (M. Goodwyn, J. Henman) - 3:29
5. "Rock n' Roll Woman" – 3:44
6. "Shotdown" – 3:39
7. "Like a Lover, Like a Song" – 6:29 (original release only - subsequent reissues edited out the extended guitar solo reducing the time to 5:12)
8. "Kick Willy Road" – 3:22
9. "The Whole World's Goin' Crazy" – 2:40

=== U.S. release ===
1. "Gimme Love" (M. Goodwyn, Hovaness "Johnny" Hagopian)
2. "Child's Garden"
3. "Rock n' Roll Woman"
4. "Wings of Love"
5. "Marjorie"
6. "So Bad"
7. "Shotdown"
8. "Like a Lover, Like a Song"
9. "Kick Willy Road"
10. "The Whole World's Goin' Crazy"

== Personnel ==
=== April Wine ===
- Myles Goodwyn – lead vocals, guitars, piano, Moog synthesizer
- Gary Moffet – guitars, backing vocals
- Jerry Mercer – drums, percussion, backing vocals
- Steve Lang – bass, backing vocals

=== Additional personnel ===
- Frank Marino – guitar on "So Bad"
- Marie Bernard – Ondes Martenot on "Wings Of Love"
- Marie-Lou Gauthier – Background Vocals on "Wings Of Love"
- Serge Locas – Mellotron, Piano
- Dwayne Ford – Piano ( A 3 )
- Frank Ludwig – Piano ( B 4 )

== Charts ==
=== Weekly charts ===
Chart (1976)	Peak position
Canada Top Albums/CDs (RPM)	1

=== Year-end charts ===
Chart (1976)	Position
Canada Top Albums/CDs (RPM)	10

== Certifications and sales ==
Region	Certification	Certified units/sales
Canada (Music Canada)	Platinum	100,000^{^}
^{^} Shipments figures based on certification alone.
