= The Dudes (1970s band) =

Canadian pop rock band

- Also known as: Dudes
- Origin: Montreal, Quebec, Canada
- Genres: Pop rock, hard rock
- Years active: 1975
- Formerly of: Bob Segarini, Brian Greenway, David Henman, Ritchie Henman, William "Kootch" Trochim

The Dudes, also known simply as Dudes were a Canadian pop rock band active during the 1970s. They were originally called "All The Young Dudes".

== History ==
The Dudes were formed in Montreal, Quebec in 1974 by Bill Trochim and Bob Segarini after the breakup of their former band, the Wackers. The other founding members of the Dudes were drummers Ritchie Henman and Wayne Cullen, and guitarists David Henman and Brian Greenway. Their debut album, We're No Angels, was released on CBS Records International and Columbia Records in 1975. It produced the hit single "I Just Wanna Dance". The album was recorded in Le Studio in Morin Heights, Quebec, and was produced by Mark Spector. The band itself was unhappy with how the album's music turned out. They subsequently toured across North America, opening for Savoy Brown and the Bee Gees. The band's members subsequently stopped focusing on making music together, and each became involved in individual projects instead. As David Henman later noted, "Oddly enough, The Dudes never officially broke up, to the best of my recollection...The whole affair just slowly fizzled out and we gradually got involved in other stuff. There was no point when we actually called it quits. We will always be the band that never broke up."

== Discography ==
- We're No Angels (CBS/Columbia, 1975)
- All the Young Dudes, All the Old Demos (Pacemaker, 1997)
