= Frigate (album) =

Studio album by April Wine
- Released: August 8, 1994
- Studio: A.R.P. Studios, St. Anne des Lacs, Quebec, Canada
- Genre: Classic rock, AOR, arena rock, hard rock
- Length: 49:30
- Label: FRE, MCA
- Producer: Myles Goodwyn

April Wine chronology
Attitude (1993)	Frigate (1994)	Champions of Rock (1996)

Professional ratings
Review scores
Source	Rating
AllMusic	2/5 stars

Frigate is the fourteenth studio album by Canadian rock band April Wine, released in 1994.

The album was re-released in 2007. The version of "Tonight Is a Wonderful Time to Fall in Love" featured on the album is a re-recording of the single from the band's 1975 album Stand Back. Frigate also features two cover songs: Willie Dixon's "I Just Want to Make Love to You", and Steve Winwood's "I'm a Man".

The ship featured on the album cover is Royal Canadian Navy frigate HMCS Antigonish.

== Track listing ==
All tracks written by Myles Goodwyn unless otherwise noted.

1. "Look into the Sun" – 4:50
2. "I Just Wanna Make Love to You" (Willie Dixon) – 4:49
3. "If I Was a Stranger" (Walter Rathie, Edward Kevin Stevens, Tom Rathie) – 4:24
4. "Tonite Is a Wonderful Time to Fall in Love" – 4:02
5. "Nothin' but a Kiss" – 4:25
6. "I'm a Man" (Steve Winwood, Jimmy Miller) – 4:11
7. "Whatever It Takes" (Brian Greenway, Myles Goodwyn) – 4:27
8. "Drivin' with My Eyes Closed" – 4:23
9. "Hard to Believe" – 5:20
10. "Keep On Rockin'" – 3:58
11. "Mind Over Matter" – 4:41

== Personnel ==
April Wine

- Myles Goodwyn – lead vocals, guitars, producer
- Brian Greenway – guitars, backing vocals
- Steve Segal – guitars
- Jim Clench – bass, backing vocals
- Jerry Mercer – drums

Additional personnel

- Jean St-Jacques – keyboards
- Walter Rathie – keyboards
- Peter Raivallo – keyboards
