= Back to the Mansion =

Studio album by April Wine
- Released: 4 September 2001
- Studio: Concrete Sound Studio, Montreal Quebec
- Genre: Rock
- Length: 43:53
- Label: Civilian, MCA
- Producer: Myles Goodwyn, April Wine

April Wine chronology
Rock Champions (2000)	Back to the Mansion (2001)	Classic Masters (2002)

Professional ratings
Review scores
Source	Rating
Allmusic	3.5/5 stars

Back to the Mansion is the fifteenth studio album by the Canadian rock band April Wine, released in 2001 (see 2001 in music).

== Track listing ==
All tracks written by Myles Goodwyn unless otherwise noted.

1. "Won't Go There" – 3:29
2. "Talk to Me" – 3:44
3. "Paradise" – 4:53
4. "Holiday" (B. Greenway) – 4:10
5. "I'll Give You That" – 4:28
6. "Wish I Could Sing" – 4:00
7. "Looking for a Place (We've Never Been)" (M. Goodwyn, Barry Stock) – 3:33
8. "Falling Down" (M. Goodwyn, Barry Stock) – 3:29
9. "In Your World" (B. Greenway) – 4:20
10. "Won't Walk That Road No More" – 3:49
11. "I Am a Rock" (Paul Simon) – 3:58

== Personnel ==
- Myles Goodwyn – lead & background vocals, guitar, keyboards
- Brian Greenway – vocals, guitars
- Jim Clench – bass, background vocals
- Jerry Mercer – drums, background vocals

- Additional vocals by: Caitlyn Bowser
- Additional guitar by: Barry Stock.
