= Electric Jewels =

1973 studio album by April Wine

Studio album by April Wine
- Released: November 1973
- Studios: Toronto Sound (Toronto, Canada)
- Genres: Hard rock; heavy metal
- Length: 37:41
- Label: Aquarius
- Producer: Ralph Murphy

April Wine chronology
| On Record (1972) | Electric Jewels (1973) | Live! (1974) |

Professional ratings
Review scores
| Source | Rating |
|---|---|
| AllMusic | 2/5 stars |

Electric Jewels is the third studio album by Canadian rock band April Wine, released in November 1973 by Aquarius Records. In a 2007 publication by Goose Lane Editions, Electric Jewels ranked number 73 in Bob Mersereau's 2007 book The Top 100 Canadian Albums.

Electric Jewels marked significant membership changes within April Wine as the founding Henman brothers left the band, and were replaced by guitarist Gary Moffet and drummer Jerry Mercer.

== Track listing ==
All tracks written by Myles Goodwyn and Jim Clench unless noted otherwise.

Side one
| No. | Title | Writer(s) | Lead vocals | Length |
|---|---|---|---|---|
| 1. | "Weeping Widow" | Robert Wright | Jim Clench | 3:54 |
| 2. | "Just Like That" | | Myles Goodwyn, Clench | 3:09 |
| 3. | "Electric Jewels" | | Goodwyn | 5:59 |
| 4. | "You Opened Up My Eyes" | | Clench | 4:50 |

Side two
| No. | Title | Lead vocals | Length |
|---|---|---|---|
| 5. | "Come On Along" | Clench, Goodwyn | 4:29 |
| 6. | "Lady Run, Lady Hide" | Goodwyn | 2:57 |
| 7. | "I Can Hear You Callin'" | Goodwyn, Clench | 3:25 |
| 8. | "Cat's Claw" | Clench | 4:46 |
| 9. | "The Band Has Just Begun" | Goodwyn | 4:12 |

== Personnel ==
April Wine

- Myles Goodwyn – lead vocals, guitars, mandolin, piano, Mellotron
- Jim Clench – vocals, bass, ARP, lead vocals on "Weeping Widow", "You Opened Up My Eyes", & "Cats Claw"
- Gary Moffet – guitars, vocals
- Jerry Mercer – percussion, vocals

Additional musicians

- David Henman – guitar
- Ritchie Henman – drums
- Richard Newell – harmonica
- Pierre Senecal – organ
- Al Nicholls – background vocals
- Pam Marsh – background vocals
- Bhen Lazaroni – string arrangements

Production

- Ralph Murphy – producer
- Terry Brown – engineer
- Dave Halbert – mixing engineer
- Jacques Des Haies – photography

== Charts ==
| Chart (1973–1974) | Peak position |
|---|---|
| Canada Top Albums/CDs (RPM) | 75 |
