= Animal Grace =

Studio album by April Wine
- Released: February 1984
- Studios: Le Studio, Morin-Heights, Québec, Canada
- Genre: Hard rock
- Length: 42:03
- Labels: Aquarius, Capitol
- Producers: Myles Goodwyn, Mike Stone

April Wine chronology
| Power Play (1982) | Animal Grace (1984) | One for the Road (1985) |

Professional ratings
Review scores
| Source | Rating |
|---|---|
| Allmusic | 2.5/5 stars |
| Kerrang! | (favorable) |

Animal Grace is the eleventh studio album by Canadian rock band April Wine, released in 1984.

The first single off the album, "This Could Be the Right One", peaked at number 58 on the Billboard Hot 100. It continues to be played on radios across Canada. The band also released "Sons of the Pioneers". Both singles included music videos.

== Track listing ==
All tracks written by Myles Goodwyn unless otherwise noted.

1. "This Could Be the Right One" – 4:16
2. "Sons of the Pioneers" – 5:35
3. "Without Your Love" – 4:52
4. "Rock Tonite" – 4:59
5. "Hard Rock Kid" (Tom Lang) – 3:57
6. "Money Talks" – 3:28
7. "Gimme that Thing Called Love" – 5:03
8. "Too Hot to Handle" – 5:04
9. "Last Time I'll Ever Sing the Blues" – 4:49

== Personnel ==
April Wine

- Myles Goodwyn – lead vocals, guitars, keyboards
- Brian Greenway – guitars, background vocals
- Gary Moffet – guitars
- Steve Lang – bass
- Jerry Mercer – drums

Additional musicians

- Marty Simon – Simmons drums
- Daniel Barbe – keyboards

== Charts ==
| Chart (1984) | Peak position |
|---|---|
| Canada Top Albums/CDs (RPM) | 34 |
| US Billboard 200 | 62 |
