= Attitude (April Wine album) =

Studio album by April Wine
- Released: May 1993
- Recorded: 1993
- Studios: Metalworks Studios, Mississauga, Ontario, Canada
- Genres: Rock, hard rock
- Length: 54:49
- Labels: FRE, MCA
- Producers: Myles Goodwyn, Co-produced George Lagios

April Wine chronology
The April Wine Collection (1992)	Attitude (1993)	Frigate (1994)

Professional ratings
Review scores
Source	Rating
Allmusic	3/5 stars

Attitude is the thirteenth studio album by the Canadian rock band April Wine, released in May 1993 (see 1993 in music). It was the band's first album since their break-up in the mid 1980s. The boy on the front cover of the album is Myles Goodwyn's son.

== Track listing ==
All tracks written by Myles Goodwyn unless otherwise noted.

1. "Givin it, Takin it" – 4:10
2. "Good From Far, Far From Good" – 3:38
3. "If You Believe in Me" (Stewart Gray, Michael Todd Kennedy ) – 4:17
4. "That's Love" – 3:55
5. "It Hurts" – 3:56
6. "Hour of Need" – 2:41
7. "Here's Looking at You Kid" – 4:08
8. "Strange Kind of Love" – 4:03
9. "Can't Take Another Nite" (B. Greenway, Jeff Nystrom) – 4:05
10. "Luv Your Stuff" – 3:05
11. "Emotional Dreams" – 4:11
12. "Voice in My Heart" (S. Gray, T. Kennedy) – 4:02
13. "Girl in My Dreams" – 4:18

== Personnel ==
- Myles Goodwyn – lead vocals, guitars, keyboards
- Brian Greenway – guitars, background vocals, harmonica
- Steve Segal – guitars
- Jim Clench – bass, background vocals
- Jerry Mercer – drums

Additional keyboards by: Jean St. Jacques and George Lagios

== Charts ==
Chart (1993)	Peak position
Canada Top Albums/CDs (RPM)	19

== Certifications ==
Region	Certification	Certified units/sales
Canada (Music Canada)	Gold	50,000^{^}
^{^} Shipments figures based on certification alone.
