= Forever for Now (April Wine album) =

Studio album by April Wine
- Released: January 1977
- Studios: Studio Tempo, Montreal, Canada; Phase One Studios, Toronto, Ontario, Canada
- Genre: Soft rock
- Length: 39:13
- Label: Aquarius
- Producer: Myles Goodwyn

April Wine chronology
The Whole World's Goin' Crazy (1976)	Forever for Now (1977)	Live at the El Mocambo (1977)

Professional ratings
Review scores
Source	Rating
Allmusic	2/5 stars

Forever for Now is the sixth studio album by Canadian rock band April Wine, released in 1977. The album features a variety of genres, including country, Western, Latin, Caribbean, blues, soft rock and easy listening.

Initially, the album sold moderately, peaking at #19 on Canadian charts in March before dropping down. Then the 1950s-style ballad "You Won't Dance with Me" became a surprise hit, selling more copies than any previous April Wine single and breathing new life into the album's sales. The single and album peaked on their corresponding charts during the same week of July 9, 1977, at #6 and #5, respectively. Both the single and the album were certified platinum in Canada.

== Track listing ==
All tracks written by Myles Goodwyn unless otherwise noted.

1. "Forever for Now" – 3:04
2. "Child's Garden" – 4:37
3. "Lovin' You" – 3:33
4. "Holly Would" – 3:44
5. "You Won't Dance with Me" – 5:10
6. "Come Away" (George Bowser, Peter Jupp) – 3:52
7. "Mama Laye" – 4:15
8. "I'd Rather be Strong" – 4:41
9. "Hard Times" (Jimmy Dean, lyrics by Goodwyn) – 2:39
10. "Marjorie" – 3:44

== Personnel ==
=== April Wine ===
- Myles Goodwyn – lead and backing vocals, guitar, piano, string ensemble
- Gary Moffet – guitar, backing vocals
- Jerry Mercer – drums, backing vocals, percussion, vibraphone
- Steve Lang – bass, backing vocals

=== Additional personnel ===
- Judy Richards - backing vocals on "Lovin' You", "I'd Rather Be Strong", "Hard Times" & "Marjorie"
- Gail Mezo - backing vocals on "Lovin' You", "I'd Rather Be Strong", "Hard Times" & "Marjorie
- Tony Grany - backing vocals on "Lovin' You", "I'd Rather Be Strong", "Hard Times" & "Marjorie"
- Mary Lou Gauthier - backing Vocals on "Come Away"
- Barry Kean - percussion on "Mama Laye"
- Pam Marsh - backing vocals & rap on "Hard Times"

== Charts ==
Chart (1977)	Peak position
Canada Top Albums/CDs (RPM)	5

== Certifications ==
Region	Certification	Certified units/sales
Canada (Music Canada)	Gold	50,000^{^}
^{^} Shipments figures based on certification alone.
