= On Record (album) =

Studio album by April Wine
- Released: April 1972
- Studios: RCA Studios, Montreal, Quebec, Canada
- Genre: Hard rock
- Length: 36:00
- Labels: Aquarius, Big Tree
- Producer: Ralph Murphy

April Wine chronology
| April Wine (1971) | On Record (1972) | Electric Jewels (1973) |

Alternate cover
- 1972 American edition

Professional ratings
Review scores
| Source | Rating |
|---|---|
| Allmusic | 2/5 stars |

On Record is the second studio album by Canadian rock band April Wine, released in April 1972. The album spawned the hit "You Could Have Been a Lady" a cover of the Hot Chocolate song that was only released one year earlier. The song peaked at No. 32 on May 19, 1972 on the Billboard Hot 100. It has since then been one of the band’s most popular songs.

== Track listing ==
All tracks written by Myles Goodwyn unless otherwise noted.

1. "Farkus" (instrumental) – 1:53
2. "You Could Have Been a Lady" (Hot Chocolate cover) (Errol Brown, Tony Wilson) – 3:40
3. "Believe in Me" – 4:02
4. "Work All Day" – 3:08
5. "Drop Your Guns" (D. Henman) – 3:37
6. "Bad Side of the Moon" (Elton John cover) (Elton John, Bernie Taupin) – 3:36
7. "Refuge" (D. Henman) – 5:08
8. "Flow River Flow" – 3:25
9. "Carry On" – 2:33
10. "Didn't You" (J. Clench) – 4:58

Dedicated to Harrison Tabb

== Personnel ==
Personnel taken from On Record liner notes.

April Wine

- Myles Goodwyn – lead vocals, guitar, keyboards
- David Henman – guitar, backing vocals
- Ritchie Henman – drums
- Jim Clench – bass, lead vocals on "Didn't You"

Additional musicians

- Keith Jollimore – flute on "Bad Side of the Moon"
- Rick Morrison – saxophone on "Carry On"
- Bhen Lanzaroni – string arrangements

Production

- Ralph Murphy – producer
- Terry Brown – recording engineer
- Art Pohemas – recording engineer
- Peter Geary – photography

== Charts ==
| Chart (1972) | Peak position |
|---|---|
| Canada Top Albums/CDs (RPM) | 35 |
