= Fast Train (song) =

- 45rpm. paper sleeve

Single by April Wine

from the album April Wine
- A-side: "Fast Train"
- B-side: "Wench"
- Released: 1971
- Recorded: RCA Studios, Montreal
- Genre: Hard rock
- Length: 2:30; 3:19 (Album Version)
- Label: Aquarius
- Songwriter: Myles Goodwyn
- Producer: Bill Hill

April Wine singles chronology
| "Fast Train" (1971) | "You Could Have Been a Lady" (1972) |

"Fast Train" is the debut single by the Canadian rock band April Wine, from their 1971 self-titled debut. It was a top 40 hit in Canada, peaking at No.38 on the RPM 100 Singles Chart. It also peaked at No.23 on the Canadian CHUM singles chart, on June 26, 1971. The success of this single established Myles Goodwyn as the band's main songwriter, and made it possible for April Wine to record a second album.

"Fast Train" appears in the soundtrack for the thriller film Natural Enemy (1997), a film starring Donald Sutherland and William McNamara.

== Chart positions ==
| Chart (1971) | Peak position |
|---|---|
| Canada CHUM Chart | 23 |
| Canada RPM 100 | 38 |
