= April Wine (album) =

Studio album by April Wine
- Released: September 1971
- Studio: RCA Studios, Montreal
- Genre: Rock
- Length: 36:21
- Label: Aquarius, Big Tree
- Producer: Bill Hill

April Wine chronology
| April Wine (1971) | On Record (1972) |

Singles from April Wine
- 1. "Fast Train"

Professional ratings
Review scores
| Source | Rating |
|---|---|
| AllMusic | 2/5 stars |

April Wine is the debut studio album by Canadian rock band April Wine, released in September 1971. The album spawned the band's debut single "Fast Train" which received fairly steady airplay.

== Track listing ==
| No. | Title | Length |
|---|---|---|
| 1. | "Oceana (David Henman)" | 4:54 |
| 2. | "Can't Find the Town (J. Henman)" | 3:45 |
| 3. | "Fast Train (Myles Goodwyn)" | 3:20 |
| 4. | "Listen Mister (Goodwyn)" | 5:35 |
| 5. | "Page Five (D. Henman)" | 6:03 |
| 6. | "Song for Mary (Jim Henman)" | 4:08 |
| 7. | "Wench (D. Henman, J. Henman, Goodwyn, Ritchie Henman)" | 4:04 |
| 8. | "Time (J. Henman)" | 3:46 |
| Total length: | | 32:15 |

== Personnel ==
April Wine

- Jim Henman - vocals, bass, acoustic guitar (lead vocals on "Can't Find the Town", "Song for Mary", "Wench", "Time")
- Ritchie Henman - percussion, keyboards
- David Henman - vocals, guitar, sitar (lead vocals on "Oceana", "Page Five")
- Myles Goodwyn - vocals, guitar (lead vocals on "Fast Train", "Listen Mister")

Production

- Bill Hill – production
- Gaetan Desbiens – engineering
- Ian Robertson – photography
