= First Glance =

Studio album by April Wine
- Released: March 1978
- Studios: Studio Tempo, Montreal, Canada & Le Studio, Morin-Heights, Québec.
- Genre: Hard rock
- Length: 33:26
- Labels: Aquarius, Capitol
- Producer: Myles Goodwyn

April Wine chronology
Live at the El Mocambo (1977)	First Glance (1978)	Greatest Hits (1979)

Alternate cover
- 1978 American sleeve

Singles from First Glance
- 1. "Roller" Released: May 1979

Professional ratings
Review scores
Source	Rating
Allmusic	3.5/5 stars

First Glance is the seventh studio album by Canadian rock band April Wine, released in March 1978. First Glance became April Wine's first significant record internationally. The album spawned the hit single "Roller", which remains one of their most popular songs and a classic rock staple.

After the success of First Glance, bands such as Rush, Journey and Styx requested for April Wine to open their shows in the United States.

== Track listing ==
=== Canadian track listing ===
All tracks written by Myles Goodwyn unless otherwise noted.

1. "Hot on the Wheels of Love" (M. Goodwyn, S. Lang) – 3:14
2. "Get Ready for Love" – 4:25
3. "Rock n' Roll is a Vicious Game" – 3:10
4. "Right Down to It" (B. Greenway) – 3:03
5. "Roller" – 4:19
6. "Comin' Right Down on Top of Me" – 4:10
7. "I'm Alive" – 2:55
8. "Let Yourself Go" – 2:56
9. "Silver Dollar" – 5:14
- This version is only available in Canada.

Note: both versions of the CD have the first two tracks in the opposite order.

=== US/UK track listing ===
All tracks written by Myles Goodwyn unless otherwise noted.

1. "Get Ready for Love" – 4:25
2. "Hot on the Wheels of Love" (M. Goodwyn, S. Lang) – 3:14
3. "Rock n' Roll is a Vicious Game" – 3:10
4. "Right Down to It" (B. Greenway) – 3:03
5. "Roller" – 4:19
6. "Comin' Right Down on Top of Me" – 4:10
7. "I'm Alive" – 2:55
8. "Let Yourself Go" – 2:56
9. "Silver Dollar" – 5:14
- The picture on the cover of the American version is also used on the album covers of Greatest Hits (1979), The Hits (1987), and Classic Masters (2002).

== Personnel ==
=== April Wine ===
- Myles Goodwyn – lead & background vocals, guitar, keyboards
- Steve Lang – bass, background vocals
- Brian Greenway – backing vocals, lead Vocals On "Right Down To It" & "Let Yourself Go", guitar, slide guitar, harmonica
- Jerry Mercer – drums & percussion
- Gary Moffet – guitar, slide guitar

=== Production ===
- Mastering by George Marino at Sterling Sound, NYC

== Charts ==
Chart (1978)	Peak position
Canada Top Albums/CDs (RPM)	62
US Billboard 200	114

== Certifications ==
Region	Certification	Certified units/sales
Canada (Music Canada)	Gold	50,000^{^}
^{^} Shipments figures based on certification alone.
