= Roughly Speaking (album) =

Studio album by April Wine
- Released: November 28, 2006
- Studio: Mound Sound, Quebec
- Genre: Rock
- Length: 24:48
- Label: Universal
- Producer: Myles Goodwyn

April Wine chronology
April Wine Rocks! (2006)	Roughly Speaking (2006)	The Hard & Heavy Collection (2009)

Professional ratings
Review scores
Source	Rating
Jam!	3/5 stars

Roughly Speaking is the sixteenth studio album by the Canadian rock band April Wine, released in November 2006.

The album was recorded without computerized modern digital recording techniques. Instead, the group employed the same type of audiophile quality analog recording technology it had used during the 1980s, including a 2-inch, 24 track master tape recorder and a state-of-the art half-inch 2-track stereo recorder. Members of the band, along with some other music fans, believe that such equipment can provide a more musically pleasing, or "vintage" type of sound.

The songs are all new material written by original frontman Myles Goodwyn, with the exception of one track, "Night Life", written by Willie Nelson.

This album marks the final April Wine LP with Goodwyn before his death on December 3, 2023, as well as the final April Wine LP with bassist Jim Clench and drummer Jerry Mercer.

== Track listing ==
1. "Saw Someone (That Wasn't There)" – 3:59
2. "I've Had Enough for Now (I Wanna Go Home)" – 2:46
3. "Night Life" (Willie Nelson, Walter Breeland, Paul Buskirk, Myles Goodwyn) – 3:18
4. "Sheila" – 3:35
5. "You Don't Even Know (How I Love You So)" – 3:01
6. "I Am, I Am" – 3:23
7. "Life Goes On" – 3:26
8. "If You're Comin' (I'm Outta Here)" – 1:20

== Personnel ==
- Myles Goodwyn – vocals, guitar, organ
- Brian Greenway – guitars, background vocals, harmonica
- Jim Clench – bass, background vocals
- Jerry Mercer – drums, background vocals
