= Harder ... Faster =

Studio album by April Wine
- Released: October 1979
- Studios: Le Studio, Morin-Heights, Quebec
- Genre: Hard rock
- Length: 32:27
- Labels: Aquarius; Capitol
- Producers: Myles Goodwyn; Nick Blagona

April Wine chronology
Greatest Hits (1979)	Harder ... Faster (1979)	The Nature of the Beast (1981)

Professional ratings
Review scores
Source	Rating
AllMusic	4/5 stars
Record Mirror	3/5 stars

Harder ... Faster is the eighth studio album by Canadian rock band April Wine, released in 1979. It was recorded at Le Studio, Morin-Heights, Quebec. The album is certified gold both in the United States and Canada by the Canadian Recording Industry Association and RIAA. The album spawned the moderately successful hits "I Like to Rock" and "Say Hello". A cover of King Crimson's 1969 hit song, "21st Century Schizoid Man", is also on the album.

The track "I Like to Rock" is amongst one of the band's most popular songs and contains the riffs from Beatles' "Day Tripper" (1965) and The Rolling Stone's "(I Can't Get No) Satisfaction" (1965). The popularity of these songs helped keep the album on Billboard’s 200 Album charts for a span of 40 weeks.

== Track listing ==
All tracks written by Myles Goodwyn unless otherwise noted.

1. "I Like to Rock" – 4:23
2. "Say Hello" – 2:59
3. "Tonite" – 4:12
4. "Ladies Man" – 3:36
5. "Before the Dawn" (B. Greenway) – 4:21
6. "Babes in Arms" – 3:21
7. "Better Do It Well" (M. Goodwyn, G. Moffet) – 3:34
8. "21st Century Schizoid Man" (R. Fripp, M. Giles, G. Lake, I. McDonald, P. Sinfield) – 6:24

== Personnel ==
=== April Wine ===
- Myles Goodwyn – lead vocals, guitars
- Brian Greenway – guitars, background vocals, lead vocals on "Before The Dawn" and "21st Century Schizoid Man"
- Gary Moffet – guitars
- Steve Lang – bass, background vocals
- Jerry Mercer – drums

== Charts ==
Chart (1979–80)	Peak position
Canada Top Albums/CDs (RPM)	25
UK Albums (Official Charts)	34
US Billboard 200	64

== Certifications ==
Region	Certification	Certified units/sales
Canada (Music Canada)	Platinum	100,000^{^}
United States (RIAA)	Gold	500,000^{^}
^{^} Shipments figures based on certification alone.
