= Stand Back (April Wine album) =

Studio album by April Wine
- Released: June 1975
- Studios: Tempo Studios, Montreal & Electric Lady, NY
- Genre: Hard rock
- Length: 38:32
- Labels: Aquarius, Big Tree, Atlantic
- Producers: Gene Cornish, Dino Danelli (Tr. 7), April Wine

April Wine chronology
Live! (1974)	Stand Back (1975)	The Whole World's Goin' Crazy (1976)

Professional ratings
Review scores
Source	Rating
Allmusic	4.5/5 stars

Stand Back is the fourth studio album by Canadian rock band April Wine, released in 1975 (See 1975 in music). It became the first album by a Canadian band to achieve platinum sales in Canada. The song "Slow Poke" features lead vocals by Myles Goodwyn that were slowed down in studio.

== Track listing ==
All tracks written by Myles Goodwyn unless otherwise noted.

1. "Oowatanite" (J. Clench) – 3:52
2. "Don't Push Me Around" – 3:14
3. "Cum Hear the Band" – 3:52
4. "Slow Poke" – 3:47
5. "Victim for Your Love" – 4:17
6. "Baby Done Got Some Soul" (J. Clench) – 2:45
7. "I Wouldn't Want to Lose Your Love" – 3:12
8. "Highway Hard Run" – 4:01
9. "Not for You, Not for Rock & Roll" – 3:14
10. "Wouldn't Want Your Love (Any Other Way)" (M. Goodwyn, J. Clench) – 2:43
11. "Tonite Is a Wonderful Time to Fall in Love" – 3:35

== Personnel ==
- Myles Goodwyn – guitars, keyboards, lead vocals
- Jerry Mercer – percussion, background vocals
- Jim Clench – bass, vocals (lead vocals on "Oowatanite" and "Baby Done Got Some Soul")
- Gary Moffet – guitars, background vocals

== Charts ==
Chart (1975)	Peak position
Canada Top Albums/CDs (RPM)	21

== Certifications ==
Region	Certification	Certified units/sales
Canada (Music Canada)	2× Platinum	200,000^{^}
^{^} Shipments figures based on certification alone.
