= Walking Through Fire =

Studio album by April Wine
- Released: 1985
- Genre: Arena rock
- Length: 41:08
- Labels: Aquarius, Capitol
- Producers: Myles Goodwyn, Lance Quinn

April Wine chronology
One For The Road (1985)	Walking Through Fire (1985)	All the Rockers (1987)

Professional ratings
Review scores
Source	Rating
AllMusic	2/5 stars
Kerrang!	4.5/5 stars

Walking Through Fire is the twelfth studio album by the Canadian rock band April Wine, released in 1985 (see 1985 in music). The album was apparently not released until 1986 in the band's native Canada.

Walking Through Fire was essentially a contractual obligation to the band's record label, to whom they still owed one album. However, by this time, the band had technically already broken up, and the album features only Myles Goodwyn and Brian Greenway from April Wine's "classic line-up," augmented by three Montreal-based session musicians. Perhaps unsurprisingly, the album is generally considered one of the band's weaker efforts, although the Goodwyn-penned track, "Love Has Remembered Me" was a minor hit and has become one of the band's best-known ballads. The first single released from the album, a tune written by two members of Katrina and the Waves called "Rock Myself to Sleep" failed to make the charts, and was later covered by Starship on their debut album Knee Deep in the Hoopla and Katrina and the Waves later recorded their own version on their 1989 album Break of Hearts.

The album peaked at number 174 on the U.S. album chart on October 12, 1985.

== Track listing ==
All tracks written by Myles Goodwyn unless otherwise noted.

1. "Rock Myself to Sleep" (Kimberley Rew, Vince De la Cruz) – 3:16
2. "Wanted Dead or Alive" (Jeff Cannata, Michael Soldan) – 3:30
3. "Beg for Your Love" (Eddie Schwartz) – 3:36
4. "Love Has Remembered Me" – 4:07
5. "Anejo" – 5:01
6. "Open Soul Surgery" (Jim Vallance) – 3:41
7. "You Don't Have to Act that Way" – 4:53
8. "Hold On" – 3:48
9. "All it Will Ever Be" – 4:39
10. "Wait Any More" – 4:22

== Personnel ==
- Myles Goodwyn – vocals, guitars
- Brian Greenway – guitars, background vocals
- Jean Pellerin – bass
- Daniel Barbe – keyboards
- Marty Simon – drums

== Charts ==
Chart (1985)	Peak position
US Billboard 200	174
