= The Nature of the Beast (album) =

Studio album by April Wine
- Released: January 12, 1981
- Recorded: 1980
- Studio: The Manor (Oxfordshire)
- Genre: Hard rock
- Length: 37:13
- Labels: Aquarius; Capitol; EMI
- Producers: Myles Goodwyn; Mike Stone

April Wine chronology
Harder ... Faster (1979)	The Nature of the Beast (1981)	The Best of April Wine: Rock Ballads (1981)

Professional ratings
Review scores
Source	Rating
AllMusic	4.5/5 stars
Music Week	4/4 stars
Record Mirror	4/5 stars

The Nature of the Beast is the ninth studio album by Canadian rock band April Wine, released in 1981. The album was recorded at Le Manoir Studios, in the village of Shipton-on-Cherwell, in Oxfordshire, England following the band's 1980 European tour. This album was April Wine's commercial peak, certified Platinum in the US and reaching No. 24 on the Billboard 200 album chart.

"Just Between You and Me" became April Wine's most successful single, reaching No. 21 on the Billboard Hot 100 singles chart, No. 11 on Billboard's Top Tracks chart, and No. 22 on the Canadian RPM charts.

April Wine's version of the Lorence Hud song "Sign of the Gypsy Queen" also became a moderate hit, reaching No. 57 on the Billboard Hot 100, No. 19 on the Top Tracks chart, and No. 40 in Canada. Hud's original version of the song had also been a hit single in Canada in 1972 (No. 16 RPM chart).

The first track on the album, "All Over Town" also received airplay on album-oriented rock radio stations, charting at No. 29 on the Top Tracks chart.

The tenth track on the album "Bad Boys" was used in the first episode of the twelfth season of Supernatural, recapping the events of the previous season.

== Track listing ==
All tracks are written by Myles Goodwyn, except where noted.

No.	Title	Writer(s)	Solos	Length
1.	"All Over Town"		Moffer & Goodwyn (Intro Harmonies), Moffet (Reversed Solo), Goodwyn (Verse Fills)	3:00
2.	"Tellin' Me Lies"		Moffet	2:59
3.	"Sign of the Gypsy Queen"	Lorence Hud	Moffet (Guitar Harmony Theme), Greenway	4:16
4.	"Just Between You and Me"		Goodwyn	3:54
5.	"Wanna Rock"		Goodwyn	2:06
6.	"Caught in the Crossfire"		Goodwyn	3:33
7.	"Future Tense"		Moffet	4:07
8.	"Big City Girls"		Greenway (1st), Goodwyn (2nd)	3:42
9.	"Crash and Burn"		Goodwyn	2:31
10.	"Bad Boys"		Greenway	3:10
11.	"One More Time"		Moffer (Intro), Goodwyn (1st), Greenway (2nd)	3:55

== Personnel ==
- Myles Goodwyn – vocals, guitars
- Brian Greenway – guitars, background vocals
- Gary Moffet – guitars
- Steve Lang – bass
- Jerry Mercer – drums

== Charts ==
Chart (1981)	Peak position
Canada Top Albums/CDs (RPM)	11
UK Albums (Official Charts)	48
US Billboard 200	26

== Certifications ==
Region	Certification	Certified units/sales
Canada (Music Canada)	2× Platinum	200,000^{^}
United States (RIAA)	Platinum	1,000,000^{^}
^{^} Shipments figures based on certification alone.
