= Roller (April Wine song) =

- 1979 Capitol Germany release

Single by April Wine

from the album First Glance
- B-side: "Right Down to It"
- Released: March 1979
- Recorded: 1978
- Studio: Le Manoir, Oxfordshire, England
- Genre: Hard rock
- Length: 4:19
- Label: Aquarius (Canada); Capitol (US)
- Songwriter: Myles Goodwyn
- Producers: Myles Goodwyn; Mike Stone

April Wine singles chronology
"Comin' Right Down on Top of Me" (1978)	"Roller" (1979)	"Get Ready for Love" (1979)

Music video
- "Roller" on YouTube

"Roller" is a song by Canadian rock band April Wine, released off their 1978 studio album First Glance. The song peaked at #25 on the RPM 100 Singles chart in Canada, and #34 on the Billboard Hot 100 on April 28, 1979, in the United States, becoming their first American hit since 1972.

The song was instantly successful in North America, and helped April Wine regain international success, as it was their first hit song outside of Canada since 1972's "You Could Have Been a Lady", after a decade of success limited to their home country of Canada. "Roller" remains a staple of the band's discography, and remains a staple of classic rock radio in both Canada and the United States.

== Background ==
Myles Goodwyn, main singer and songwriter for April Wine, penned the song in 1976, though it wasn't recorded until 1978, when it was released as a single from the album, becoming the album's biggest hit.

== Charts ==
=== Weekly charts ===
Chart (1979)	Peak position
US Billboard Hot 100	34
Canada RPM Top Singles	24

=== Year-end charts ===
Chart (1981)	Peak position
US Billboard Hot 100	97
Canada RPM Top Singles	30

== In popular culture ==
"Roller" has been featured in several films, most notably Joe Dirt (2001), Grown Ups 2 (2013), and The Heat (2013). It also has been in several television shows such as Freaks and Geeks season 1, episode 3, "Tricks and Treats"; the "Pilot" episode of The Americans in 2013, season 2, episode 6 "Take Me Away" of Being Erica in 2011; and the 2009 Canadian documentary The Beat Goes On: Canadian Pop in the 1970s, which also included several other April Wine songs.
