= Brian Greenway =

Canadian musician

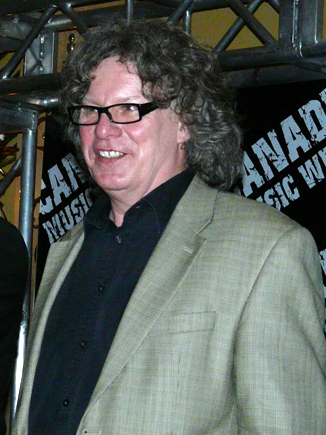
- Greenway in 2009

Background information
- Born: October 1, 1951 (age 75); Hawkesbury, Ontario, Canada
- Genres: Rock; hard rock; blues rock
- Occupation: Musician
- Instruments: Guitar; harmonica; vocals
- Years active: 1970–1986; 1988; 1992–present
- Member of: April Wine; The Blues Bus
- Formerly of: Mashmakhan; the Dudes; Brian Greenway's Attic Dust Solo Show
- Website: Geenway's page on April Wine's official website

Brian Gilbert Greenway (born October 1, 1951) is a Canadian musician who is the longest-serving member of the rock band April Wine, which he joined in 1977 and performs guitar, harmonica, and vocal duties. Prior to joining April Wine he was a member of the bands Mashmakhan and the Dudes. Greenway initially performed with April Wine from 1977 to 1986 when the band split, and again from 1992 to the present day.

After founding member Myles Goodwyn disbanded April Wine in 1986, Greenway embarked a solo career and recorded his debut album Serious Business, which continued the traditional April Wine mix of hard rock and ballads. It is often said that Greenway is responsible for giving April Wine their "harder edged" sound.

In 2016, Greenway formed a band called Brian Greenway's Blues Bus with former April Wine bandmate Gary Moffet (guitar/vocals), along with Craig Miller (harp/vocals), Mark Higden (drums), and Lloyd Dallaire (bass).

== Television special ==
In 1991, Greenway became the subject of his own hour-long television special entitled Brian Greenway and Friends. The show featured Greenway and his ensemble of friends (keyboardist Jimmy Tanaka, guitarist Jeff Smallwood, bassist Jeff Nystrom, supporting vocalist and percussionist Nanette Workman, and former Mashmakhan/April Wine drummer Jerry Mercer) performing songs from both his 1988 solo project and April Wine catalogue. This In-Concert special was video-taped live in Laval, Quebec by CFCF-Channel 12 Montreal, and broadcast nationally by CTV-Canada on August 7, 1991, and February 15, 1992.

== Discography ==
=== With April Wine ===
- First Glance (1978)
- Harder... Faster (1979)
- Monsters of Rock (1980)
- The Nature of the Beast (1981)
- Power Play (1982)
- Animal Grace (1984)
- Walking Through Fire (1985)
- The Hits (1987)
- All the Rockers (1987)
- We Like to Rock (1988)
- Oowatanite (1990)
- The April Wine Collection (1992)
- Attitude (1993)
- Frigate (1994)
- Champions of Rock (1996)
- Greatest Hits Live (1999)
- Rock Champions (2000)
- Back to the Mansion (2001)
- I Like to Rock (2002)
- Classic Masters (2002)
- Greatest Hits Live 2003 (2003)
- From the Front Row ... Live! (2003)
- Best of April Wine (2003)
- Roughly Speaking (2006)
- April Wine Rocks! (2006)
- First Glance / Harder.....Faster (2007)
- The Hard & Heavy Collection (2009)
- Animal Grace / Walking Through Fire (2009)
- The Nature of the Beast / Power Play (2012)
- Future Tense... Live In Toronto 21 Nov 82 (2015)

=== With Mashmakhan ===
- Mashmakhan (1970)
- The Family (1971)

=== With the Dudes ===
- We're No Angels (CBS/Columbia, 1975)
- All the Young Dudes, All the Old Demos (Pacemaker, 1997)

=== Solo ===
- Serious Business (1988)

== See also ==
- Music of Canada
