= Just Between You and Me (April Wine song) =

1981 single by April Wine

- 45 RPM picture sleeve

Single by April Wine

from the album The Nature of the Beast
- B-side: "Big City Girls"
- Released: February 1981
- Recorded: Le Manoir Studios 1980
- Genre: Arena rock
- Length: 3:56
- Label: Aquarius, Capitol
- Songwriter(s): Myles Goodwyn
- Producer(s): Myles Goodwyn, Mike Stone

April Wine singles chronology
"I Like to Rock" (1980)	"Just Between You and Me" (1981)	"Sign of the Gypsy Queen" (1981)

Audio
- "Just Between You and Me" on YouTube

"Just Between You and Me" is a single by Canadian hard rock band April Wine, from their ninth studio album The Nature of the Beast, released in 1981 (see 1981 in music).

== Background ==
The music video for this song was the fourteenth video played on MTV's first day of broadcast (August 1, 1981), making it the first video by a Canadian recording artist ever played on MTV.

The final chorus of the album version includes the song's title in French: "Seulement entre toi et moi".

== Chart performance ==
"Just Between You and Me" was a top 25 hit in the US (their only top 30 hit in the US and their third and final top 40 hit in the country), and peaked at No.13 on the CHUM Chart in Toronto, Canada. It was also a minor hit in the UK, where it went to No.52.
