= Jim Clench =

Canadian musician (1949–2010)

- Born: James Patrick Clench; May 1, 1949
- Died: November 3, 2010 (aged 61) Montreal, Quebec, Canada
- Genres: Rock
- Occupation: Musician
- Instruments: Bass, vocals
- Years active: 1971–2006

James Patrick Clench (May 1, 1949 – November 3, 2010) was a Canadian bassist, vocalist and songwriter known for his roles in the rock bands April Wine and Bachman–Turner Overdrive.

== With April Wine (first run) ==
Clench was asked to join April Wine after their original bassist Jim Henman decided to leave the band in October 1971. Although Myles Goodwyn was April Wine's primary lead singer, Clench was lead vocalist on songs such as the hit singles "Oowatanite" (which he also wrote) and "Weeping Widow". In 1975, after recording three studio albums and one live, Clench decided to leave April Wine and was replaced by former Mashmakhan bassist Steve Lang.

Early April Wine albums recorded with Clench include; On Record (1972), Electric Jewels (1973), Live! (1974), and Stand Back (1975), which was released just before he left the band.

== With Bachman–Turner Overdrive ==
In 1978, Clench was asked to join Bachman–Turner Overdrive to replace Randy Bachman, who decided to start a solo career. Clench was with BTO until its first breakup in 1979, appearing on the albums Street Action (1978) and Rock n' Roll Nights (1979). In addition to playing bass, Clench shared lead vocal duties with Fred Turner and wrote multiple songs for these two albums.

Shortly afterwards, Clench also appeared as a guest musician on Bryan Adams's 1980 debut album.

In 1980, Clench formed and toured with his own group, 451 Degrees. They released one album in Canada only. A video of their hit song, "Don't Walk", is available on YouTube.

Clench also appeared in Loverboy, who made their live debut opening for Kiss at Pacific Coliseum in Vancouver, British Columbia, on November 19, 1979. Shortly after this show, Clench was replaced by Scott Smith.

== With April Wine (second run) ==
In 1992, April Wine reformed and Clench accepted an invitation to rejoin. He then took part in four more studio albums recorded after the reformation. Those albums include; Attitude (1993), Frigate (1994), Back to the Mansion (2001), and Roughly Speaking (2006). Clench also appears on April Wine's Greatest Hits Live 2003.

In late 2006, Clench once again left April Wine, and was replaced by former Brutus/Offenbach bassist Breen LeBoeuf at the beginning of 2007.

== Death ==
On November 3, 2010, Clench died in a Montreal hospital after battling stage 4 lung cancer.
