= Steve Lang =

Canadian bassist (1949–2017)

- Born: Stephen Keith Lang; March 24, 1949; Montreal, Quebec, Canada
- Died: February 4, 2017 (aged 67)
- Genres: Rock; hard rock; blues rock
- Occupation: Bassist
- Years active: 1976–1984
- Formerly of: April Wine; Mashmakhan

Stephen Keith Lang (March 24, 1949 – February 4, 2017) was a Canadian bassist best known for his time and work with the rock band April Wine from 1976 to 1984 during the band's most successful years.

== Early life ==
Lang was born in Montreal, Quebec. He was the father of musician Erin Lang.

== Career ==
Lang joined April Wine in 1976, replacing then-bassist Jim Clench. That year he recorded with the band for their fifth studio album The Whole World's Goin' Crazy (1976).

Lang left April Wine in 1984 and pursued the financial field and former original bassist Jim Clench rejoined after Langs departure and took over bass duties until the band disbanded in 1986.

When April Wine reformed in 1992 for a tour, Lang was offered to rejoin the band but ultimately decided not to and stuck with his investment business. Jim Clench was then drafted back into the band. Clench died in 2010.

== Death ==
Although no official cause of death has been announced Lang reportedly suffered from Parkinson's disease. and died on February 4, 2017, at the age of 67.

== Discography ==
=== With April Wine ===
- The Whole World's Goin' Crazy (1976)
- Live at the El Mocambo (1977)
- Forever for Now (1977)
- First Glance (1978)
- Greatest Hits (1979)
- Harder... Faster (1979)
- Monsters of Rock (1980)
- The Nature of the Beast (1981)
- Live in London (1981)
- Power Play (1982)
- Animal Grace (1984)
- Classic Masters (2002)

== See also ==
- Canadian rock
- Music of Canada
