= April Wine =

Canadian rock band

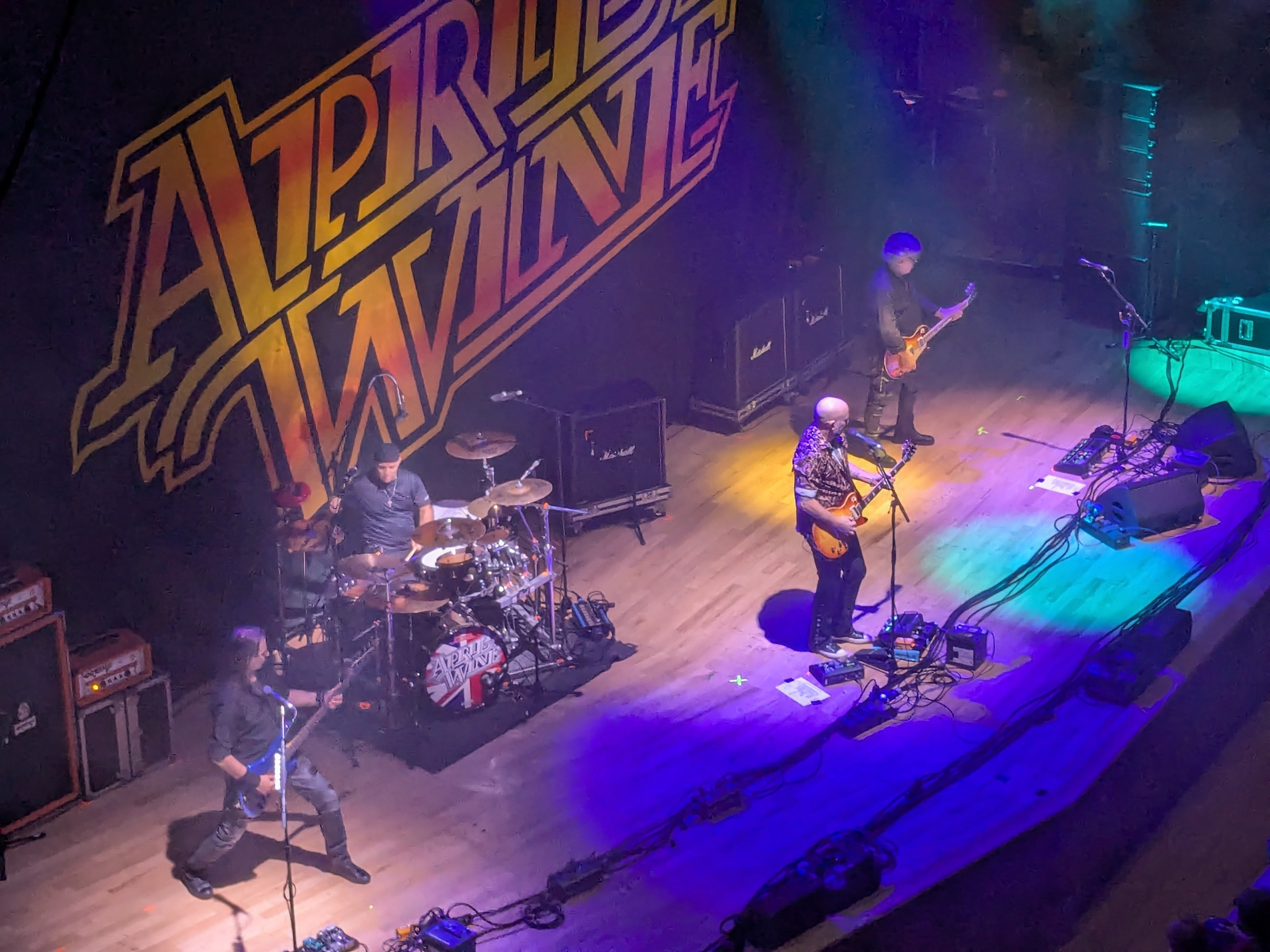
- April Wine performing in 2025

Background information
- Origin: Waverley, Nova Scotia, Canada
- Genre: Hard rock
- Years active: 1969–1985; 1992–present
- Labels: Aquarius; MCA; Capitol; DIR Broadcasting; Cherry Red; London; Flood Ross; Civilian; Universal; BGO.Telemedia Communications; PIAS
- Members: Brian Greenway; Richard Lanthier; Roy Nichol; Marc Parent
- Past members: Myles Goodwyn; Jim Henman; David Henman; Ritchie Henman; Gary Moffet; Steve Lang; Steve Segal; Carl Dixon; Jim Clench; Jerry Mercer; Breen LeBoeuf; Blair Mackay
- Website: aprilwine.ca

April Wine is a Canadian rock band formed in 1969 and originally based in Halifax, Nova Scotia, led by singer-guitarist-songwriter Myles Goodwyn until his death in 2023. April Wine first experienced success with their second album, On Record (1972), which reached the Top 40 in the Canadian album chart and yielded two hit singles: a cover of Elton John's "Bad Side of the Moon", a top 20 hit in Canada; and a cover of Hot Chocolate's "You Could Have Been a Lady", a number 2 song in Canada.

They have experienced only moderate international success, but great popularity in their home country of Canada, reaching the Top 40 singles charts with 21 different songs. Their greatest response internationally throughout the 1970s and early 1980s came with songs such as "You Could Have Been a Lady" (1972), "Tonite Is a Wonderful Time to Fall in Love" (1975), "Roller" (1979), "I Like to Rock" (1980), "Sign of the Gypsy Queen" (1981), and "Just Between You and Me" (1981). They have released 16 studio albums.

== History ==
=== Early years ===
Although April Wine officially began in late 1969 in Waverley, Nova Scotia, their roots can be traced to St. John's, Newfoundland and Labrador, in 1967/68, where brothers David and Ritchie Henman grew up playing music together before moving to Nova Scotia.

Three of the founding members - David Henman (guitar, vocals), Ritchie Henman (drums, keyboards) and their cousin Jim Henman (bass, guitar, vocals) - were originally in a band named Prism (not to be confused with the Vancouver-based band of the same name). After a brief break to attend university, the trio reformed with Myles Goodwyn on lead vocals and guitar. Goodwyn had previously played with Jim Henman in a group called the Termites. David Henman christened the new group "April Wine", and after they realized that Halifax did not provide opportunities to play and record, they sent a demo tape to Aquarius Records in Montreal. Aquarius managers Terry Flood and Donald K. Tarlton returned a rejection letter but the band mistook it for an invitation.

On April 1, 1970 April Wine went to Montreal, bringing with them their instruments and $100 in cash; Flood and Tarlton were persuaded to sign the band to a contract. They were set up in a chalet and booked at a local comedy club, Café André. They spent the next five months touring eastern Canada with Mashmakhan.

The band recorded and released their self-titled debut album April Wine in September 1971. The album included a single, "Fast Train", which was a top 40 hit in Canada and peaked at No. 38 on the RPM Singles Chart.

The album did not sell all that well. Nonetheless, the success of the single led the band's label to ask for a second album. However, after deciding that the rock band touring lifestyle was not for him, bassist Jim Henman left the band in September of 1971 and was replaced by Jim Clench. In the meantime, the group spent 1971 touring the college circuit, with the exception of July 30, when they opened at Montreal's Place des Nations for The Guess Who. 1972 was much the same, although they began to play larger venues and opened for other big acts, like Ike & Tina Turner, Jethro Tull, Badfinger and Stevie Wonder.

=== Mainstream success ===
Under the guidance of producer Ralph Murphy, April Wine recorded their second album, On Record, in 1972. The first single was a cover version of the Hot Chocolate song "You Could Have Been a Lady". The record was a commercial success, hitting number two for a single week on the RPM Canadian charts, as well as cracking the Billboard Hot 100 chart in the United States where it stayed for 11 weeks, peaking at No. 32. A second single, a cover of "Bad Side of the Moon" by Elton John and Bernie Taupin, also got much airplay on Canadian radio and was a minor charter (No. 106) in the U.S. Both tracks remain staples on classic rock radio stations in Canada. On Record was certified Gold in Canada and the band, along with Murphy, returned to the studio.

While the band was recording their third album in 1973, Ritchie Henman decided to leave after a falling out with Goodwyn and Clench, followed by his brother David. Goodwyn and Clench then held auditions and the replacements were drummer Jerry Mercer (formerly of Mashmakhan) and guitarist Gary Moffet. They finished the album, Electric Jewels, with the songs "Weeping Widow," "Just Like That" and "Lady Run, Lady Hide", which would stay in April Wine's set lists for many years.

In support of this album, the band embarked on the Electric Adventure Tour where nearly every Canadian arena or concert hall that seated more than 2,500 saw the band play. The tour also featured a massive lighting and pyrotechnic show.

Touring proved successful; Gene Cornish and Dino Danelli of The Rascals attended a 1974 concert in Massey Hall, and were so impressed they offered to record and produce a live album of the band. The one-night recording session was something of a rushed enterprise; they wanted the album to be released by the end of the tour. Goodwyn wasn't happy with the sound, but April Wine Live went gold.

=== Gold and platinum years ===
The band's fifth release, 1975's Stand Back, went double platinum in Canada, riding on the success of the singles "Tonight Is A Wonderful Time To Fall In Love" and "I Wouldn't Want To Lose Your Love". April Wine then went on tour with Heart, then Thundermug.

After the tour for Stand Back in 1975, Jim Clench left and formed the Jim Clench Band. He went on eventually to join Bachman–Turner Overdrive (in 1977); he was replaced by Steve Lang.

In April 1976 April Wine became the first band to sell out Regina Stadium and the first band to sell out Edmonton's Kinsmen Field House two nights in a row.

The band's next release, in 1976, was The Whole World's Goin' Crazy. It was the first April Wine release to hit platinum status based on advanced sales orders alone. The album contained the popular title track as well as a hit single, the ballad "Like A Lover, Like A Song".

Their sixth album, Forever for Now, was another platinum seller and contained the band's biggest single to date, "You Won't Dance With Me".

On March 4 and 5, 1977 April Wine was booked to play a charity concert at Toronto's famed El Mocambo Club. The co-headliner on the bill was a band called "The Cockroaches", which turned out to be The Rolling Stones. The pseudonym was a poorly kept secret and huge crowds turned out for the event. April Wine's performance was captured and released as the album Live at the El Mocambo. The band then got its first chance at touring the U.S., opening for The Rolling Stones, Styx and Rush.

Also in 1977, Brian Greenway of The Dudes (the Henmans' new band) was brought in as a third guitarist and co-vocalist. This allowed Goodwyn to switch to keyboards for ballads. They also signed to Capitol Records (in addition to Aquarius).

1978 saw continued Canadian success and the beginning of international success. The band's seventh album, and the first with Capitol, was First Glance, which had an immediate impact and the singles "Let Yourself Go" and "Get Ready For Love" were successful on Canadian radio. It was the third single, the raucous "Roller", that brought the band mass appeal across North America—it stayed on the Billboard Hot 100 for eleven weeks. First Glance stayed on the Billboard album chart for many weeks, making it April Wine's first gold record outside of Canada.

Constant touring helped propel the band to greater success, as Americans embraced the hard rock of this "new" band from Canada—in 1978, they toured with Rush and played with Triumph, Starcastle, and Teaze and, in July, played a concert with the Rolling Stones, Journey and the Atlanta Rhythm Section.

Following on the popularity of First Glance, April Wine released Harder ... Faster in 1979. "Say Hello" and "I Like to Rock" were popular hits on both sides of the border and Harder ... Faster proved to be yet another multi-platinum release for the band. It would stay on the Billboard top album chart for 40 weeks. 1979 was spent touring with Styx, Rush, Toto, Boston, Squeeze and Blue Öyster Cult.

By now, the band had accumulated enough hits that Aquarius was able to release the album Greatest Hits. In 1979, the BBC released In Concert for international distribution; in 1981 Aquarius released another compilation album, The Best of April Wine Rock Ballads.

=== 1980s ===
On August 16, 1980 the band performed at the inaugural Monsters of Rock festival in Castle Donington, England.

The Nature of the Beast was released in January 1981. Riding on the popularity of the hit single "Just Between You and Me" and the band's cover of the Lorence Hud song "Sign of the Gypsy Queen", the album hit multi-platinum success in Canada and was the first April Wine album to reach platinum status internationally.

April Wine embarked on an extensive support tour, performing to their largest crowds ever. In addition to a packed schedule of solo concerts, they toured with Diamond Head, Harlequin, Krokus and Franke and the Knockouts, played five concerts with Loverboy and travelled to Germany to play a show with Neil Young, Jethro Tull, the Michael Schenker Group (MSG) and King Crimson. The band then went on an eighteen-month hiatus.

In July 1982 April Wine released their tenth studio album, Power Play. The album included the singles "Enough is Enough", "If You See Kay" and "Anything You Want, You Got It". The latter would become the band's opening number on the supporting tour, while the "Enough is Enough" video started receiving frequent rotation on MTV.

Despite decent sales, Power Play was not met with the same critical acclaim the prior two albums had received; both the album and its singles charted well on Billboard's lists, but for shorter periods of time than their earlier albums and singles. Still, it was certified gold, and then platinum, in October.

The Power Play tour in 1982 was the band's most extensive—three months, with Saga, Eddie Money and Uriah Heep. The New York concerts with Saga and Money resulted in separate Live From Central Park albums.

The band started writing and recording their next album, Animal Grace, but by this time, the members were not getting along, and Myles Goodwyn moved from Canada to the Bahamas. Both Animal Grace and its single "This Could be the Right One" rose quickly on the charts, but stayed only for a short time.

In 1984 the band got together for an announced "Farewell Tour", which was a month-long trek across Canada. The tour was successful enough to spawn another live album, One for the Road.

April Wine still owed Capitol Records one more album. Greenway flew down to join Goodwyn in Nassau, along with Montreal session musicians Daniel Barbe (keyboards), Jean Pellerin (bass) and drummer Marty Simon, to record what was supposed to be the band's final album, Walking Through Fire. It was released in September 1985 under the April Wine name.

=== Rebirth ===
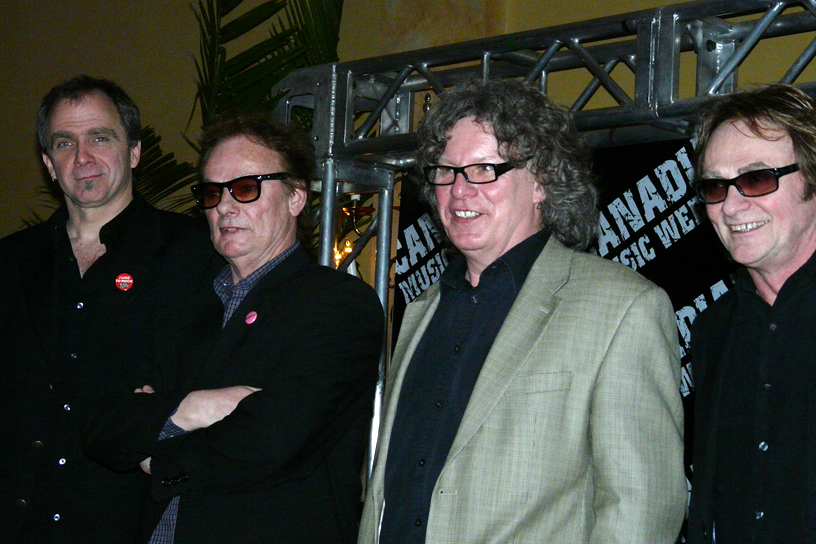
The band in 2009

In 1988 Goodwyn moved back to Canada. Although there was interest in an April Wine reunion, and the subject was discussed among the former members, other commitments prevented them from getting the band back together at that time.

April Wine finally reunited in 1992, starting with a free concert in June 1992 in Portage la Prairie, Manitoba at the city's annual Strawberry festival.

The reunited band consisted of Goodwyn, Greenway, returning drummer Jerry Mercer and bassist Jim Clench, who returned after Steve Lang had initially expressed interest but ultimately passed after his schedule became too busy. Clench hadn't played with the band since 1975. Filling out the act was third guitarist Steve Segal, coming in for Gary Moffet, who declined to return. The band then toured in both Canada and the US.

In 1993, now with Flood Ross Entertainment, they released the first "true" April Wine album in a decade, Attitude. It was certified gold in Canada soon after its release. Segal remained with the band through one more studio release, 1994's Frigate. And each year, for the next five years, they went out on tour, playing with, among others, Def Leppard, Foreigner, Meat Loaf, Loverboy, Peter Frampton, Blue Öyster Cult and Nazareth.

The band released another album in 2001, entitled Back to the Mansion.

Also in 2001, the band's song "Roller" was featured in the movie Joe Dirt. Then in 2003, they released the live album called Greatest Hits Live 2003. In the meantime, various labels released several compilation albums.

In 2004 Silverline released April Wine's first DVD-A called From the Front Row ... Live!. From 2001 to 2004 their live shows included Carl Dixon (formerly of the bands Coney Hatch and The Guess Who) on guitars, keyboards and backing vocals.

April Wine entered into its 37th year as a band in 2006. On October 31 of that year, Aquarius Records released April Wine Rocks!, a new compilation of April Wine favourites, including a bonus live tune and a new album, entitled Roughly Speaking, that was released on November 28, 2006. By the end of that year, Clench had left the band for the second time. In his 2016 autobiography, Just Between You And Me, Myles Goodywn stated that Clench was let go when he became angry and belligerant and impossible to deal with. Clench was replaced by bassist Breen LeBoeuf.

A year later, Jerry Mercer was fired as well. In his aforementioned autobiography, Goodwyn said that Mercer's drug use, which had become seriously problematic, had gotten out of hand, but that Mercer had refused to curb it; his scheduled final show in Calgary, Alberta, ringing in the 2009 new year, was cancelled due to inclement weather. Mercer was then replaced by drummer Blair Mackay.

April Wine was inducted into the Canadian Music Hall of Fame at the Juno Awards of 2010 in St. John's, Newfoundland and Labrador. Goodwyn and Greenway accepted the honour.

On November 3, 2010 Jim Clench died in Montreal, of lung cancer, at 61.

LeBoeuf, who wanted to explore other musical ventures, decided to leave April Wine the following July. He suggested Richard Lanthier, from the Yes tribute band Close to the Edge, as his successor. Mackay, who had been attempting several times to form side bands against Goodwyn's wishes, was let go by Goodwyn in March 2012. Mackay was succeeded by Roy "Nip" Nichol, of the band SamHill.

Sadly, April Wine's former bassist Steve Lang died on February 4, 2017, at age 67, of Parkinson's disease.

Labels continued to release their music; BGO Records released a re-mastered The Nature Of The Beast / Power Play in 2020. April Wine continued to tour across Canada annually and to play festivals in Europe and in the United States, with the group consisting of Goodwyn, Greenway, Lanthier and drummer Roy "Nip" Nichol. They played a concert in Ottawa in September 2021.

Their song "Sign of the Gypsy Queen" can be heard in the background in the penultimate Breaking Bad episode Granite State; the guitar solo is playing behind Jesse's recorded confession tape being watched by Todd and Uncle Jack in the neo-Nazi compound.

In December 2022 Myles Goodwyn announced that he would no longer be touring with the band, turning over his vocal and guitar duties to Marc Parent (previously with Eight Seconds):

"I've had a long career, happy, fulfilling. I've seen much of the world and I'm grateful to continuing support of radio and our fans worldwide, but touring has been very difficult in recent years because of my diabetes and my health comes first, so unfortunately, my touring days are officially over."

From this point on, Goodwyn planned to focus on writing and recording only, and he played his final show with the group in early March 2023, with original April Wine member Jim Henman coming out on stage to take a bow during his farewell speech.

Goodwyn died in Halifax, Nova Scotia on December 3, 2023, at the age of 75. His departure and death left the band without any original members.

During the spring and summer of 2026, the band toured the US and Canada as the special guests of reunited fellow Canadian band Triumph.

== Band members ==
Current

- Brian Greenway – guitar, harmonica, vocals (1977–1985, 1992–present)
- Richard Lanthier – bass, backing vocals (2011–present)
- Roy Nichol – drums, percussion, backing vocals (2012–present)
- Marc Parent – lead vocals, guitar (2022–present)

== Awards ==
April Wine has never won a Juno despite 11 nominations. However, they were inducted into the Canadian Music Hall of Fame at the Juno Awards of 2010.

Myles Goodwyn was awarded the Dr. Helen Creighton Lifetime Achievement Award from the East Coast Music Awards in 2003.

In 2008, April Wine was inducted into the East Coast Music Hall of Fame.

April Wine was also inducted into the Canadian Music Industry Hall of Fame and awarded with its Lifetime Achievement Award on March 13, 2009.

== Discography ==
Studio albums

- April Wine (1971)
- On Record (1972)
- Electric Jewels (1973)
- Stand Back (1975)
- The Whole World's Goin' Crazy (1976)
- Forever for Now (1977)
- First Glance (1978)
- Harder ... Faster (1979)
- The Nature of the Beast (1981)
- Power Play (1982)
- Animal Grace (1984)
- Walking Through Fire (1985)
- Attitude (1993)
- Frigate (1994)
- Back to the Mansion (2001)
- Roughly Speaking (2006)

== See also ==
- Canadian rock
- Music of Canada
- List of bands from Canada
