= Jerry Mercer =

Canadian drummer (born 1939)

- Born: April 27, 1939 (age 87); Dominion of Newfoundland
- Genres: Rock, hard rock, blues rock
- Occupation: Drummer
- Years active: 1957–2009
- Website: aprilwine.ca

Gerald Mercer (born April 27, 1939) is a Canadian drummer, best known for his work with the rock groups Mashmakhan, April Wine as well as Offenbach.

== Personal life ==
Mercer was born in Dominion of Newfoundland. Prior to becoming a full-time musician, Mercer worked both as a cattle farmer and as an IBM computer programmer.

== Career ==
Mercer's start in the music industry was as a singer, but quickly moved to drums while still a teenager. He played several different styles in his early years, including Latin and jazz, Jerry Mercer was the drummer for Trevor Payne and The Soul Brothers in the early 1960s in Montreal. With the departure of Trevor Payne the group became known as The Triangle, who later changed their name to Mashmakhan upon obtaining a record deal in Toronto. Mercer's work can be heard on the band's most successful single "As the Years Go By". As part of Mashmakhan, Mercer played on the Festival Express tour and was interviewed for the 2003 documentary.

Following Mashmakhan's dissolution in the early 1970s, Mercer played for Roy Buchanan, and then The Wackers, before joining April Wine, who were in the process of changing their line-up following the departure of two founding members in 1973. His first public performance with the band was as an opening slot for T. Rex and Three Dog Night at Toronto's Exhibition Stadium. Shortly thereafter, he completed his first album with the band, Electric Jewels, which contained the hit "Weeping Widow". Mercer remained with the band consistently since joining, and played on all their subsequent albums and tours. In November 2008, he stated that he was retiring at the end of the year. He was replaced by Blair Mackay in January 2009. In May 2010, Mercer became the first Canadian to receive a Legends Award at the 10th annual Cape Breton International Drum Festival.

In his live shows, Mercer was known for lengthy drum solos (often during April Wine's cover of King Crimson's "21st Century Schizoid Man") which frequently include a strobe light show.

In addition to performing, Mercer was also involved in manufacturing drums with a company he co-founded with Bill Hibbs called Monolith Drums. Briefly assuming the brand name "Solstice Drums", now back to Monolith and about to celebrate 20 years of drum making. Mercer is no longer involved with Monolith Drums.

At the end of 1980, Mercer played briefly with Offenbach, a French-Canadian blues-rock outfit. He played on the band's 1980 album Offenbach Live à Montreux.

== Discography ==
=== Le Triangle ===
Trio formed by Pierre Senecal on organ, Rayburn Blake on guitar and Jerry Mercer on drums who would later form Mashmakhan.

Single

- 1969 : 2 Miroirs/Les Montagnes Russes

=== Mashmakhan ===
- 1970 : Mashmakhan
- 1971 : The Family

=== April Wine ===
Studio albums

- Electric Jewels (1973), Aquarius Records
- Stand Back (1975), Aquarius Records
- The Whole World's Goin' Crazy (1976), Aquarius Records
- Forever for Now (1977), Aquarius Records
- First Glance (1978), Aquarius Records
- Harder ... Faster (1979), Aquarius Records
- The Nature of the Beast (1981), Aquarius Records, Capitol Records
- Power Play (1982), Aquarius Records, Capitol Records
- Animal Grace (1984), Capitol Records
- Walking Through Fire (1986), Aquarius Records, Capitol Records
- Attitude (1993), Flood Ross Entertainment
- Frigate (1994), Flood Ross Entertainment
- Back to the Mansion (2001), Civilian Records
- Roughly Speaking (2006), Universal Music Canada

Live albums

- April Wine Live (1974), Aquarius Records
- Live at the El Mocambo (1977), Aquarius Records
- In Concert (1980), BBC Transcription Services
- Live in London, on VHS (1981), Picture Music
- Live From Central Park, split with Saga (1982), Telemedia Communications, TBS Syndications
- Live From Central Park, split with Eddie Money (1982), Telemedia Communications
- One For The Road (1985), Aquarius Records
- From the Front Row ... Live! (2004), Silverline
- Live in London (2009), Cherry Red Records

Compilation albums

- Greatest Hits (1979), Aquarius Records
- The Best of April Wine Rock Ballads (1981), Aquarius Records
- King Biscuit Flower Hour, split with Michael Stanley Band (1981), DIR Broadcasting
- King Biscuit Flower Hour, split with John Waite (1983), DIR Broadcasting
- All the Rockers (1987), Aquarius Records
- The Hits (1987), Aquarius Records
- The First Decade (1989), Aquarius Records
- Oowatanite (1990), Aquarius Records
- Rock Ballads (1990), Aquarius Records
- The April Wine Collection (1991), Aquarius Records
- Champions of Rock (1996), Disky
- Back to Back Hits split with Great White (1996), CEMA Special Markets
- King Biscuit Flower Hour Presents...April Wine (1999), DIR Broadcasting
- Rock Champions (2000), EMI
- Classic Masters (2002), Capitol Records
- Best of April Wine (2003), Aquarius Records
- Greatest Hits Live 2003 (2003), Civilian Records
- April Wine Rocks! (2006), Aquarius Records
- Animal Grace / Walking Through Fire (2009), BGO Records
- First Glance / Harder... Faster (2007), BGO Records
- The Hard & Heavy Collection (2009), Micro Werks
- The Best of April Wine Rock Ballads (2009), Aquarius Records
- The Nature of the Beast / Power Play (2012), BGO Records (re-released 2020)
- Classic Album Set (2016), Caroline Records

=== Offenbach ===
- 1980 : Offenbach Live à Montreux

=== Buzz Band ===
- 1980 : Buzz Band

=== Collaborations ===
- 1972 : Shredder by The Wackers
- 1973 : Second Album by Roy Buchanan

== Health ==
In 1997, Mercer was diagnosed with prostate cancer, but finished treatment for it the following year.

== See also ==
- April Wine
- Mashmakhan
