= Myles Goodwyn =

Canadian rock musician (1948–2023)

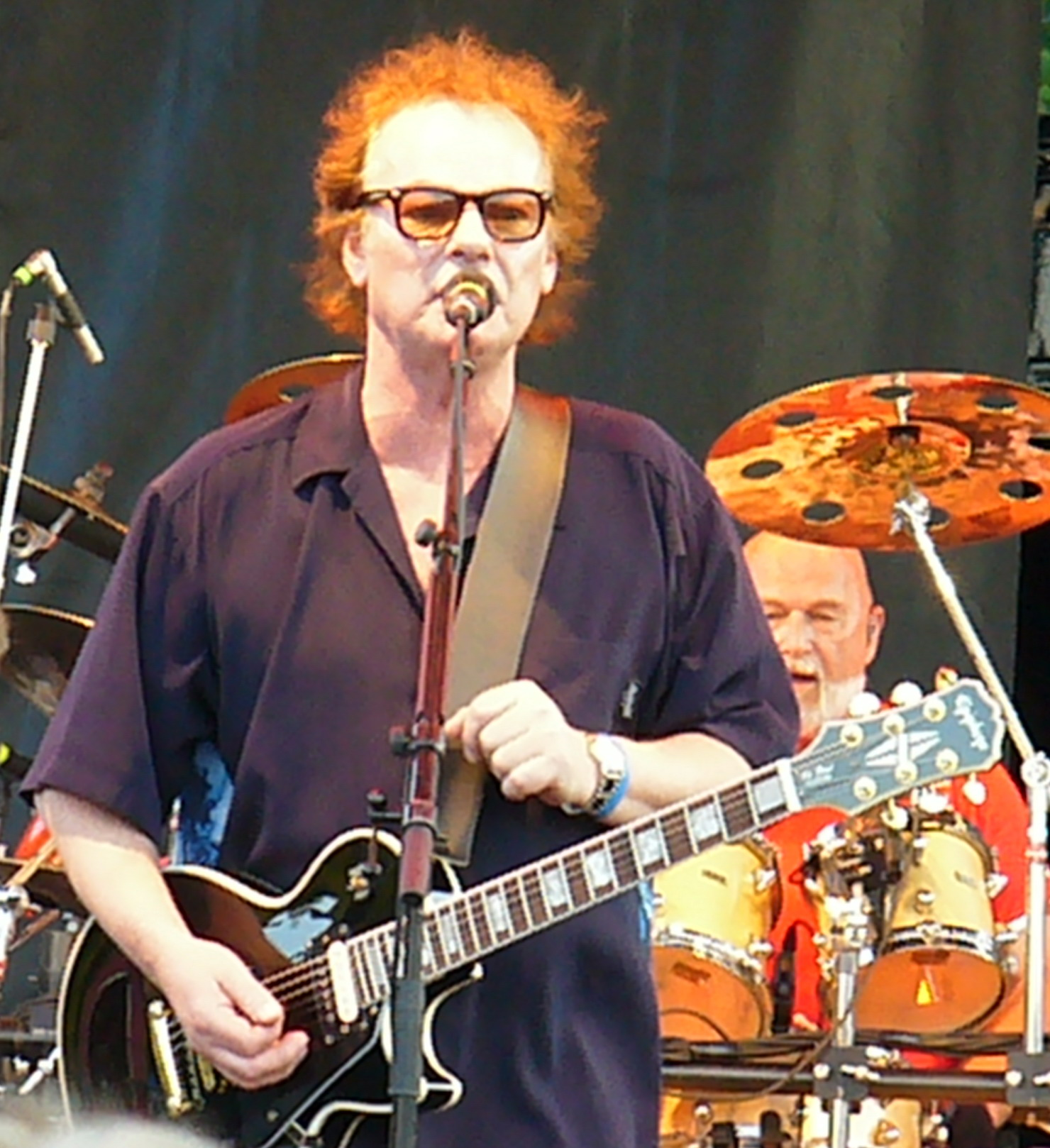
- Goodwyn in 2008

Background information
- Born: June 23, 1948; Woodstock, New Brunswick, Canada
- Died: December 3, 2023 (aged 75) Halifax, Nova Scotia, Canada
- Genres: Rock; hard rock; blues; blues rock
- Occupations: Musician; songwriter; record producer
- Instruments: Vocals; guitar; keyboards
- Years active: 1969–2023
- Formerly of: April Wine
- Website: aprilwine.ca

Myles Francis Goodwyn (June 23, 1948 – December 3, 2023) was a Canadian musician. He was the lead vocalist, guitarist, and principal songwriter of the rock band April Wine. He released 16 studio albums with April Wine, and four albums as a solo artist. Goodwyn led the group from its inception and garage band roots to its multiplatinum sales peak. He received the National Achievement Award at the 2002 SOCAN Awards, an ECMA Lifetime Achievement Award, and was inducted into the Canadian Songwriters Hall of Fame. He was inducted into Canada's Walk of Fame and the Canadian Music Hall of Fame as a member of April Wine.

== Early life ==
Goodwyn was born on June 23, 1948, in Woodstock, New Brunswick. He grew up in Waverley, Nova Scotia, and recalled hitchhiking to church on Sundays.

== Career ==
Goodwyn helped form April Wine in 1969, with David Henman (guitar), Ritchie Henman (drums), and Jim Henman (bass). He led the group from its inception and garage band roots to its multiplatinum sales peak. Following the band's peak and commercial success during the 1970s and early 1980s, Goodwyn also pursued a solo career.

In 2002, Goodwyn won the National Achievement Award at the annual SOCAN Awards held in Toronto. In January 2003, he received an ECMA Lifetime Achievement Award for his impact on the music industry of Atlantic Canada.

In March 2008, Goodwyn stated in an interview that he had been in the studio recording his second album Myles Goodwyn & Friends of the Blues. It was to be an all-blues album featuring guest performers such as Amos Garrett, David Wilcox, Frank Marino, Kenny "Blues Boss" Wayne and Rick Derringer. Goodwyn stated that the record was an opportunity to rediscover a passion for blues music, and that he was inspired by the music of Taj Mahal.

In 2010, Goodwyn and April Wine were inducted into the Canadian Music Hall of Fame. In 2016, his autobiography, Just Between You and Me, was released. In 2018, his second book was published–Elvis And Tiger. His second album Myles Goodwyn and Friends of the Blues was released in 2018, and earned an ECMA award for "Blues Recording of the Year" in 2019. He subsequently released Myles Goodwyn and Friends Of The Blues 2 in 2019, which also earned the same ECMA award for "Blues Recording of the Year" in 2020. In 2022, Goodwyn received the Singapore International Festival of Arts award for his song "For Ukraine", judged in the "best social impact music/art" category.

On December 20, 2022, Goodwyn retired from touring with April Wine due to his diabetes and poor health. As of 2022, Goodwyn was the only original member of April Wine to be active with the band. He continued to write material for the band, and gave his final live performance with April Wine on March 2, 2023, in Truro, Nova Scotia.

Goodwyn was inducted into the Canadian Songwriters Hall of Fame in 2023, and April Wine was inducted into Canada's Walk of Fame in 2023. During his career, April Wine sold more than 10 million albums, and were nominated 11 times for Juno Awards. Goodwyn felt that his induction into the Canadian Songwriters Hall of Fame was his greatest achievement.

== Personal life and health issues ==
Goodwyn was raised in Nova Scotia, then lived in Quebec for decades. Later in life, he lived in the Halifax area.

He had abused alcohol for many years, finally having it catch up to him when he collapsed and nearly died from internal bleeding in 2008. After months of rehab, he committed to publishing his memoir titled Just Between You And Me, telling the story of his life and his career. In 2014, he decided to take a step back from April Wine, the band started playing fewer shows while Myles searched for a replacement for himself in the group; he cited health reasons and a desire to no longer be on the road. Goodwyn announced that he would be retiring due to health concerns in March 2023, having found what he viewed as a suitable replacement for himself within the group and no longer wanting to travel frequently. He continued to perform as an acoustic solo artist for the remainder of 2023. He died at age 75 on December 3, 2023, in Halifax. No cause of death was officially announced but a band member stated the cause as cancer.

== Discography ==
Discography of Goodwyn:

=== with April Wine ===
==== Studio albums ====
- April Wine (1971)
- On Record (1972)
- Electric Jewels (1973)
- Stand Back (1975)
- The Whole World's Goin' Crazy (1976)
- Forever for Now (1977)
- First Glance (1978)
- Harder ... Faster (1979)
- The Nature of the Beast (1981)
- Power Play (1982)
- Animal Grace (1984)
- Walking Through Fire (1985)
- Attitude (1993)
- Frigate (1994)
- Back to the Mansion (2001)
- Roughly Speaking (2006)

=== Solo ===
- Myles Goodwyn (1988)
- Myles Goodwyn and Friends of the Blues (2018)
- Myles Goodwyn and Friends of the Blues 2 (2019)
- Myles Goodwyn Long Pants (2022)

=== Singles ===
- "Do You Know What I Mean" (with Lee Aaron) (1988) [No. 47 CAN]
- "My Girl" (1988) [No. 41 CAN]
- "Are You Still Loving Me" (1988) [No. 88 CAN]

== Production credits ==
Year	Album	Artist	Co-produced with
1975	"Lady Lover" (45 single)	Bronze	-
1976	The Whole World's Goin' Crazy	April Wine	-
1977	Forever for Now	April Wine	-
1978	First Glance	April Wine	-
1979	One Night Stands	Teaze	-
1979	Harder ..... Faster	April Wine	Nick Blagona
1980	Ladies Man	April Wine	Nick Blagona
1980	Body Shots	Teaze	-
1981	The Nature of the Beast	April Wine	Mike Stone
1982	Power Play	April Wine	Mike Stone
1984	Animal Grace	April Wine	Mike Stone
1985	One for the Road	April Wine	Mike Stone
1986	Walking Through Fire	April Wine	Lance Quinn
1988	Myles Goodwyn	Myles Goodwyn	Lance Quinn
1990	The Best of Teaze (Over 60 Minutes With...)	Teaze	-
1993	Attitude	April Wine	George Lagios
1994	Frigate	April Wine	-
2001	Back to the Mansion	April Wine	April Wine
2002	Bulletproof	Julian Austin	-
2006	Roughly Speaking	April Wine	-
