= Magic Management =

Music management company

- Type: Music group management
- Industry: Music
- Founded: 1970, 1971
- Founder: Peter Francey, Clark Spencer
- Headquarters: London Ontario, then Toronto, Canada
- Key people: Peter Francey, Clark Spencer
- Parent: Truck Music Ltd.

Magic Management was a music management company that managed Canadian acts such as Jay Telfer, Truck, Christopher Kearney, Terry Dee and The Good Bros. during the 1970s. They also managed English group Hit & Run which was based in Toronto. They became involved with an exercise involving Prime Minister Pierre Trudeau to encourage young people to vote. They became one of the few music-related companies at the time who were able to incorporate management and creative requirements for their acts. Their subsidiary Slic Brothers was nominated three times for a Juno Award in the mid-1970s.

== Background ==
Described as a group of companies, they operated on several fronts. In 1972, Magic Management was also a division of the Toronto-based company, Truck Music Ltd. Truck Music Limited also handled the PR work for some acts on their level. One of them was the jazz rock folk duo Aarons & Ackley who were signed to the Capitol label. In August, 1973, Magic Management was described as the PR arm of Consolidated Entertainment whose directors were Craig Nicholson, Clark Spencer, Jim Skarrate and Peter Francey. There weren't many companies around at the time who could incorporate the creative services and management requirements for musical artists. Magic Management was able to take care of the requirements on various levels.

A subsidiary of Magic Management was Slic Brothers. They designed the covers for artists Peter Foldy, Greaseball Boogie Band, Moe Koffman, The Stampeders and Jay Telfer.

== History ==
=== 1970 to 1972 ===
Formed by Peter Francey and Clark Spencer in 1970 / 1971, the company was based in London Ontario. They started out representing non-recording musical acts.

On April 19, 1972, an event for the group Truck was organized by promoter Michele Frank. A celebration was held at Thunder Sound Studios in honor of Sundog Production's acquisition of the group. In addition to organizing the event, Frank's efforts had been put into sorting the public relations and getting the key music industry people to come. Another attendee invited to witness the event was Skip Prokop from the group Lighthouse. Music magazine RPM Weekly reported on the event. It also published a photo in its May 6 article. Members, Brian Wray, Jimmy Roberts, Larry Ernewein, Joey Miquelon, Mike Curtis, Graham Lear appeared in the photograph with the group's managers Clark Spencer, Peter Francey and Dennis Murphy of Sun dog Productions. It was also noted by RPM Weekly, the expectation of Murphy and Sun Dog Productions would soon be releasing an album of the group.

Also in 1972, they were regularly enlisting the services of artist John Martin who was the cousin of Peter Francey. Martin an Ontario Art College graduate was living in Vancouver. He was called to Toronto where he set about on his task of designing promo material for Truck, Christopher Kearney and The Good Brothers. With a solid reaction to his work, a company Slic Brothers was created and operated as a subsidiary of Magic Management.

In September, 1972, a full page Magic Management advertisement appeared in Billboard. It listed some of their acts, Christopher Kearney, Truck and The Good Bros. Included was M. Frank Associates handling publicity and promotion and the field representative, Tim Lawrence.

In November, two Magic Management acts had been roped into an exercise to pull in the youth vote. Band Truck and The Good Brothers were to be utilized by Prime Minister Pierre Trudeau's First-Time Voter Committee to be part of a youth-oriented tour. Starting in Ottawa, the four day venture was to take them via Yukon, Winnipeg, Thompson, Calgary, Whitehorse, Vancouver and Regina.

=== 1973 ===
In January 1973, it was announced that Magic Management were going forward in negotiating with a UK company for a European tour for Christopher Kearney. At that time Kearney had two albums under his belt, both produced by Sundog Productions. Kearney was also set to tour Western Canada that month.

In February 1973, they pulled one of their groups, Truck off the road for a month. The group who already had a single "Get it Together Out" had to use the down time to rehearse new material, polish their stage presentation and get ready for heavy schedule related to the release of their Capital album that was due for release that month.

It was mentioned in the March 31, 1973 issue of Billboard that Magic Management had been acquired by Consolidated Entertainment Corporation Inc. By August, 1973, Karen Quee had recently been appointed to the position of director of public relations. At the time she was working closely with Capitol Records, coordinating publicity for acts Truck and Christopher Kearney. In addition to Truck and Christopher Kearney, their Roster included The Good Brothers, Terry Dee, The Toronto-based English group, Hit & Run and Touchstone, a group featuring Polydor artist, Lisa Hart.

=== 1974 ===
One group that auditioned for them was West that featured Paul Sanderson. Magic Management took them on board with Truck. Through the company they ended up auditioning for Shawne Jackson, backing her for three months, just before she had her Domenic Troiano-penned hit "Just as Bad as You" in 1974. By May, 1974, Axe Records artist Jay Telfer had signed on to Magic Management for an exclusive management agreement. Kangi Records artist Jeff Addams had also signed up around the same time. Some time prior to June 7, they lost two of their acts from their roster, Christopher Kearney and Hero.

By October 1974, Magic Management and Slic Brothers had re-located to 49 Wellington Street, E. Toronto.

== Slic Brothers ==
Slic Brothers was an independent promotion-design company. It was originally formed by Peter Francey and Clark Spencer's Toronto-based company, Truck Music Limited. The company came about as a result of the positive reaction to the work of design artist John Martin. It worked as a subsidiary of Magic Management. Two creative people that came on board to work in Slic were John Hanna and Brian Cranley.

In May 1973, it was reported that they were expanding and moving to produce press kits for all Magic Management acts as well as moving into producing promotional films with the first a sixty-minute film of Magic Management acts. In 1973, they designed LP covers for the Greaseball Boogie Band, Moe Koffman and the Stampeders, completing the task by December. Their parent company, Truck Music Limited had already produced a 20-minute documentary for the promotion of their acts to potential clients and booking agencies earlier that year.

By 1975, the staff included Peter Francey, artists, John Martin, John Hanna, Jeanette Hanna and David Wyman, photographer Gerrard Gentil and project co-ordinator Clark Spencer. For the team's efforts they had three Juno nominations. This included nomination for best LP graphics, and a "service publication acknowledging Toronto as the entertainment capital of Canada, Night Out magazine. By December that year, Slic had moved out from their old studio to a larger area of 3,500 square feet at their new premises, 75 Sherbourne Street in Toronto's down town.

== Magic Management roster (partial list) ==
- Jeff Addams
- Terry Dee
- The Good Bros.
- Hero
- Hit & Run
- Christopher Kearney
- Truck
- Jay Telfer
- Touchstone, Lisa Hart
- West

== Later years ==
Peter Francey was partner in the Spencer Francey Group who in 1986 were selected by Time Magazine for one of the Ten Best Designs on their package design for Ability Software. In the early 2000s, Peter Francey was an executive in the Toronto-based consultancy, Spencer Francey Peters which was founded in 1991 resulting from the merger of Michael Peters Group and Canadian design consultancy Spencer Francey. Also described as a graphic design firm specializing in corporate communications and package design, its roots went back to a Toronto company, Fifty Fingers that was founded in 1975. In 2004, Francey and co. sold the business to Cundari SFP. They left in November 2009 and formed Trajectory, a new independent branding agency.

Jeannette Hanna, one of the artist team of Slic Management co-wrote the book, Ikonica: A Field Guide to Canada's Brandscape, published by Douglas & McIntyre in 2008.

== Links ==
- Discogs: Slic Bros.
- Discogs: Slic Bros II
