= Truck (Truck album) =

Studio album by Truck
- Released: 1973
- Studio: Thunder Sound
- Genre: Jazz rock
- Label: Capitol ST 6388
- Producer: Dennis R. Murphy

Truck is the debut album by Canadian jazz rock band, Truck. Consisting of original compositions, it was produced by Dennis R. Murphy of Sundog Productions. Released in early 1973 on the Capitol label, it made the Canadian charts and hung around for about a month and a half.

== Background ==
The possibility of Truck releasing an album was noted in an issue of RPM Weekly dated May 6, 1972. At the end of June was when they were to start work on the album with producer Dennis Murphy.

According to the January 6, 1973 issue of Billboard, Truck's debut album was to be released by Capitol in mid-January. From early February to early March the group was taken off the road by their bosses at Magic Management to work on various aspects of their performances as well as the preparation for the heavy schedule coinciding with the release of the album.

When the album was released, the line-up included Graham Lear on drums and percussion, Larry Ernewein on bass and backing vocals, Bill Usher on congas and bongos, Joey Miquelon (aka Joey Roberts) on guitar, Brian Wray on keyboards, flute and backing vocals, Michael Curtis on lead vocals, flute, acoustic guitar and percussion and James Roberts on tenor saxophone, flute and organ. The opening track on the album, "Rollin's On My Mind" was co-written by Graham Lear with keyboardist Brian Wray. The rest of the tracks on Side A were "Rain", "People", "Can't Wait (Until Tomorrow)", "Please Don't Come Shining Your Light" and on Side B, "Sing a Song", "Get it Together", "Take a Look", "Ernie" and "Another Dream". The rest of the tracks were composed by members of the group.

A press party scheduled for April was organized by Capitol Records to commemorate the release of the album.

The album includes the songs from the two singles, "Rain", "Get It Together" and "Can’t Wait Until Tomorrow", except for "Canada".

== Airplay and charting ==
By April 7, it had been getting airplay on Harvey MacKinnon's list at DAL Radio in Halifax, and Charlotte Baxter's list at Radio Erindale in Clarkson. The following week, it was on Steve Shacher's play list at Radio Brockist in Catharines. For the week of April 21, the album was still on Charlotte Baxter's list. It was also when the album made its first appearance in the charts. It entered the RPM100 Albums Chart at #100. The following week it was at #98. By May 26, having spent six weeks in the charts it was at #85.

== Track listing ==
Truck, Capitol ST 6388
No.	Track	Composer	Time	Notes
A1	"Rollin's On My Mind"	Brian Wray, Graham Lear	3:02	
A2	"Rain"	Michael Curtis	3:21	
A3	"People"	Truck	3:32	
A4	"Can't Wait (Until Tomorrow)"	James Roberts	3:50	Lead vocals James Roberts
A5	"Please Don't Come Shining Your Light"	Joey Miquelon, Michael Curtis	6:00	
B1	"Sing a Song"	Brian Wray, Larry Ernewein, Michael Curtis	3:06	
B2	"Get It Together"	Brian Wray	2:48	
B3	"Take a Look"	Brian Wray, Michael Curtis	7:00	
B4	"Ernie"	Larry Ernewein	1:17	
B5	"Another Dream"	Michael Curtis	3:50	

== Personnel ==
Group personnel
Name	Role	Notes
Michael Curtis	Lead vocals, flute, acoustic guitar, percussion	
Larry Ernewein	Bass, backing vocals	
Graham Lear	Drums, percussion	
Joey Miquelon	Electric Guitar	
James Roberts	Tenor saxophone, flute, organ	
Bill Usher	congas, bongos	
Brian Wray	Keyboards, flute, backing vocals	

Non musical personnel
Name	Role	Notes
Don Dunsmore	Protography	
John Martin	Album cover design	(for Slic-Brothers, Canada)
Dennis R. Murphy	Producer	A Sundog Production
Phil Sheridan	Engineer	
Paul White	A&R	
