= Lisa Hartt =

- Also known as: Lisa Hartt Spillane
- Born: Lisa Eisenhardt
- Origin: Montreal
- Genres: Folk, Rock, vocal jazz
- Occupation: Musician
- Instruments: Vocals, guitar
- Years active: 1960 to present
- Labels: Polydor, Quality, Rising Records, Music For World Peace Records
- Formerly of: The Chrystal Staircase with ken Tobias, The Christine Lee Set, Gino Vanelli Band The Lisa Hartt Band Lisa Hartt & the Times, Lisa Hartt & the Muscles of Expression
- Spouse: widow of Michael Spillane
- Website: www.lisaharttmusic.com

Lisa Hartt is a Canadian singer and Juno Award nominee. She was the lead singer of The Lisa Hartt Band during the 1970s. They had a hit with "Old Time Movie". As a solo artist, she also had a radio hit with the single "Touch Me".

== Background ==
Lisa Hartt was born in Montreal in 1949 and grew up in La Tuque and Dorval, Quebec. She ventured into music at the age of ten. She was part of a choir in Dorval who was chosen to do a jingle and she was paid her first royalty of ten dollars at ten years of age. It was game on. She started her career in Montreal in the folk music cafes like Cafe Andre and the Yellow Door singing solo. At the age of 15 she was working as a backing singer for artists. Some years later, she was singing backup for Gino Vannelli. In addition to Vanelli, she has worked with April Wine, Rayburn Blake of the group Mashmakhan, Natalie Cole, David Foster, Ralph Murphy, Anne Murray, Phil Ramone, Brenda Russell, Ken Tobias, and Maurice White.

Her international career has seen her performing in various parts of the world. She was nominated for a Juno Award for Breakthrough Artist of the Year in 1976.

Her first band included musicians, Wayne Pilon on bass and Brian Wray on Keyboards. Wray had been a member of 70s groups, Natural Gas, Motherlode and Truck.

== Career ==
1960s to 1980s

In 1973, she recorded the single, "Touch Me" bw "Aftermath" which was released on Polydor 2065 182. Written by her, it was just credited to her first name. On August 11, it had moved from #60 to #56 on the RPM Weekly Programmers Pop Music Playlist. It managed to get to #41 on September 22.

In 1976, she was an artist on the Rockabye Hamlet cast album. It also featured, Rory Dodd, Cal Dodd, Cliff Jones and The Irish Rovers. She performed the songs, "If My Morning Begins", "The Last Blues I'll Ever Sing", and "Denmark Is Still".

=== Lisa Hartt Band period ===
In 1975, Lisa Hartt released the single, "The Last Blues I’ll Ever Sing" bw "Let’s Live Together" on Rising RI-001X.

Album

In 1976, the band released the album Starwatcher on Rising RRLP 104. The first single from the LP was "All Over the World" which was produced by Phil Ramone The band's album created enough noise to get her a Juno Award nomination in 1976. In 1977, it was an RPM Weekly "Feature Album" for March 12, a "Cancon LP" pick by the Steede Report on February 19, and a Record Week album pick for February 28. Additionally, the single "All Over the World" was a Steed Report "Top Pick" for March 5, and a Record Week "Single Pick" for February 28.

Further activities

Music magazine, Record World reported in its April 2 issue that "All Over the World" was getting heavy airplay.

They followed up that year with "Old Time Movie" bw "Starwatcher" on Rising RR-003. In late May, RPM Weekly reported that Rising Records were promoting three singles, "Everyone's Gone to the Movies" by Rockgarden, "Old Time Movie" by The Lisa Hartt Band, and "Let The Games Begin" by Kidstuff. In June, the single peaked at #12 on Vancouver's CKLG chart and spent a total of eight weeks in the chart. The band released "Dream Me Away" bw "Sweet Serenade" on Rising RR-010 in 1977.

In mid-July 1977, RPM Weekly wrote that it was confirmed the band would tour with Aquarius Records recording act, April Wine and open for them. At that time the band consisted of Hartt on guitar and vocals, Rayburn Blake on guitar, Richard Yuen on keyboards, Marty Cordrey on drums, and their newest member Ray Hands on bass who had replaced Denny Gerrard.

In the February 18, 1978, issue of Billboard, there was a report of a suggestion by an earlier article that the group had left the Rising Records label and were in negotiations with other companies. Robert Hahn of Champlain Productions was not impressed and claimed that the band had a "subsisting agreement" with the label.

=== Post Lisa Hartt Band ===
1990s to 2000s

On November 22, 2018, she was at a Cashbox Canada Legacy award presentation for John Harris, a prominent figure in the Canadian music industry. He was also her manager at one stage. She performed her hit, "Old Time Movie" and "Tower of Song" which was composed by Leonard Cohen.

In 2022, she recorded a 4-track EP titled Arrival which includes the song "Don't Tell Me How I Feel" which is a tribute to her late brother, Christopher who died in 2015. Joan Prowse of Cinefocus created, produced and directed the video for the song. The single was released on November 11. The EP is due for release in January, 2023. It contains another song "Wasted" which is an account of her life on the road and the toll it took.

== Discography Selective ==
=== Solo ===
Singles
Act	Release	Catalogue	Year	Notes
Lisa	"Touch Me" bw "Aftermath"	Polydor 2065 182	1973	
Lisa Hartt	"Don’t Tell Me How I Feel"	Music For World Peace Records	2022	

Album
Act	Release	Catalogue	Year	Notes
Rory Dodd, Cal Dodd, Lisa Hartt, Cliff Jones, The Irish Rovers	Rockabye Hamlet	Rising Records RILP 103	1976	

=== Lisa Hartt Band ===
Singles
Act	Release	Catalogue	Year	Notes
The Lisa Hartt Band	"The Last Blues I'll Ever Sing" / "Let's Live Together"	Rising Records RI 001X	1975	
The Lisa Hartt Band	"All Over the World" / "Didn't You Know"	Rising Records RR. 008	1976	
The Lisa Hartt Band	"Old Time Movie" / "Starwatcher"	Rising Records RI 003X	1976	
The Lisa Hartt Band	"Easy Come, Easy Go" / "Dream Me Away"	Rising Records RR. 006	1976	
The Lisa Hartt Band	"Dream Me Away" / "Sweet Serenade"	Rising Records RR. 010	1977	

Album
Act	Release	Catalogue	Year	Notes
The Lisa Hartt Band	Starwatcher	Rising RR-104-M	1977	
