= Carol McCartney =

- Origin: Canada
- Genre: Jazz
- Occupation: Musician
- Instrument: Vocals
- Labels: Century Recording And Productions Inc., ZSP, Moxy

Carol McCartney is a singer on the Canadian jazz scene and a former Canadian beauty competition winner.

== Family and early life ==
McCartney grew up on Verobeach Blvd, Toronto. She went to Gulfstream Public School and then later Emery Collegiate Institute. At the age of 16 her father entered her in the Miss Toronto pageant. She won the 1978 title and was the third runner up in the Miss Canada event. She got her Bachelor of Music Theatre Performance degree from Sheridan college in 1981.

She has been the featured singer with the Toronto, Vancouver, Nashville and Detroit orchestras and at least twenty more. Her album A Night in Tunisia was very well received and was in good standing with the critics.

She has had a street named after her. In 2013, The City of Toronto named a Weston Street "McCartney Street", as she grew up there.

She has been nominated for a Juno Award and the Mississauga Arts Council presented her with a Marty Award from the for best Established Artist in 2014.

She is married to Jesse Collins.

== Career ==
=== 1980s to 1990s ===
Sometime in the 1980s McCartney recorded the album Stop Foolin' Around for the Century Recording And Productions Inc. label. The title song was written by Paul Zaza and featured him on keyboards. It was from the film Breaking All the Rules and that version was sung by Yvonne Murray. She also had two 12-inch singles released. They were "Slow Down" bw "I Can't Understand" on ZSP ZSP-2348 and "If You Love Me Like You Say You Love Me" bw "If You Love Me Like You Say You Love Me" (Instrumental Version) on Century Recording And Productions Inc. ACR-5042.

In September 1987, she was at the Miss Canada Pageant with Michael Danso singing a Gershwin melody as part of the musical entertainment side that featured songs of Cole Porter and Gershwin.

=== 2000s ===
In February 2006, she fronted the Edmonton Symphony Orchestra in a tribute to Benny Goodman, featuring Bob DeAngelis; also with her and the orchestra were John McLeod on trumpet and Lorne Nehring on drums.

Her album A Night in Tunisia was released in 2007. It was a mixture of ballads, blues and up-tempo tracks, which included the songs "No More Blues" and "Ev'ry Time We Say Goodbye". Two musicians that guested on the album were vibes player Peter Appleyard and horn player Guido Basso. Reviewer Michael P. Gladstone for All About Jazz gave the album a 3 and a half star rating, saying that she could deliver ballads from the Great American Song Book as well as well as up-tempo jazz standards, giving "A Night in Tunisia" as an example.

In July 2011 she was set to appear at the Academy Theatre stage for the theater's 2011 Curtain's Up summer season. In December that year she appeared at The Jazz Room at the Huether Hotel in Uptown Waterloo with her group, the Carol McCartney Quartet.

She was one of the headline acts for The Brantford International Jazz Festival in 2013; her backing group was Brian Dickinson on piano, Kieran Overs on bass, Frank DiFelice on drums, and Chris Robinson on saxophone.

Be Cool album

In 2014, her album Be Cool was released. The musicians who played on it were,Terry Clarke on drums, Brian Dickinson on piano, Lorne Lofsky on guitar, Mike Malone on flugelhorn, Kieran Overs on bass, and Chris Robinson on tenor saxophone and alto saxophone. The majority of the arrangements were by Brian Dickinson. McCartney produced the album herself. However, Brian Wray who had been a member of 1970s groups Truck, Motherlode, and Natural Gas, did some arranging on this album.

In his review of the album, Edward Blanco of All About Jazz called it "An astonishing vocal jazz project" and "Well worth the wait". He also gave it a four star rating. The Metroland Media Group's Mississauga.com reviewer said that the album was the mature work of an assured pro.

Following the release of her album, she appeared at Toronto's Jazz Bistro for a three-night run. A reviewer noted the variation in material.

== Discography (selective) ==
Singles
Act	Release	Catalogue	Year	Notes
Carol McCartney	"Slow Down", "I Can't Understand" / "Slow Down", "I Can't Understand"	ZSP ZSP-2348	198?	12-inch 33 rpm
Carol McCartney	"If You Love Me Like You Say You Love Me" / "If You Love Me Like You Say You Love Me" (Instrumental Version)	Century Recording And Productions Inc. ACR-5042	198?	12-inch 45 rpm

Album
Act	Release	Catalogue	Year	Notes
Carol McCartney	Stop Foolin' Around	Century Recording And Productions Inc. ACR-5045	198?	Vinyl LP
Carol McCartney	Let The Girl Drive	Moxy MP2002CD	2002	CD
Bob Brough Quartet with Guest Vocalist Carol McCartney	Like a Spring Day	RHB C 80802	2004	CD
Carol McCartney	A Night In Tunisia	Moxy MOXY2007-01	2007	CD
Carol McCartney	Be Cool	Moxy	2014	CD
