= Truck (Canadian band) =

Canadian rock group (1966–1974)

- Also known as: Sound Spectrum
- Origin: Ingersoll, Ontario, Canada
- Genres: Jazz rock, rock
- Years active: 1966–1974
- Label: Capitol
- Past members: Michael Curtis; Larry Ernewein; Graham Lear; Joey Miquelon; James Roberts; Bill Usher; Brian Wray

Truck was a 1970s Canadian rock group with a musical style similar to Natural Gas and Lighthouse. Signed to the Capitol label, they released two singles and an album. The outfit started out as Sound Spectrum in 1966 and by the early 1970s they had absorbed experienced musicians from groups Natural Gas and Motherlode. Their name had also been changed to Truck! The 1970s lineup was completely different to what it was when the group began. A busy live attraction, they did reasonably well with their album Truck which had an unbroken run for about a month-and-a-half in the charts.

== Background ==
Beginning as Sound Spectrum, the early members were Dave Borland, Bill Caldwell, Bruce Fleming Sandy MacKay and Rob Oliver. In 1972, and now called Truck, they had a completely different line up. They were managed by Clark Spencer and Peter Francey. Their management company was Magic Management which was a division of the Toronto-based company, Truck Music Ltd. They were recorded and produced by Dennis Murphy of Sun Dog productions.

Michael Curtis was a founding member of the Goshen, Indiana band, These Vizitors which included Travis Rose, his brothers Rick Curtis, Tom Curtis and sister Patti Curtis. Relocating to Florida, they played at the Kandy Bar and played at local clubs in West Palm Beach area. They also opened for numerous touring bands. He co-wrote a single for the group, "Happy Man" bw "For Mary’s Sake" which was released on Capitol P-2163 in May 1968.

Larry Ernewein was a young man who was very passionate about music. He joined Truck when he left high school.

Graham Lear had been in George Olliver's group Natural Gas and Freedom North.

Saxophonist Jimmy Roberts was originally from Virginia, he came to Toronto in 1969 with a group made up of John T. Davis, George Brown and Doug Walker. William "Smitty" Smith got them a job at the Sapphire Club.

Joey Roberts aka Joey Miquelon had come in from Motherlode.

In the 1960s, Brian Wray was in the group Five Of a Kind which also had a pre-Mashmakhan Brian Edwards in their line up, and had been an arranger for some tracks on Freedom North's self-titled album that was released in 1970. He had also been in both Natural Gas and Motherlode.

Converting a trademark red school bus, they toured extensively throughout Ontario and other parts of Canada. The group gained a good amount of attention for their bold use of "Keep On Truckin'" posters and car-bumper stickers. The group performed every week from 1970 to 1973, until their management took them off the road for a short period in February that year.

During their time, Truck opened up for ELP, Deep Purple, and Fleetwood Mac. The biggest gig they played was to 20,000 people at the Rockwood Music Festival in Orangeville, Ontario.

== Career: Sound Spectrum ==
The group started in 1966 in Ingersoll, Ontario. The early line up consisted of Dave Borland, Bill Caldwell, Bruce Fleming, Sandy MacKay, and Rob Oliver. Drummer Sandy McKay was originally from Ingersoll. In 1969, he moved to London to play with the group.

In 1970, the group was located in London, Ontario. Still billed as Sound Spectrum, one event they played at was the Rock Hill Rock-In festival that ran from September 5 to September 6 that year. Other groups that were booked to appear there were Mud Flat from Toronto, Pour Soul from England, Madrigal from Hamilton, and April from Orangeville.

== Career: Truck ==
=== 1972 ===
With the Sound Spectrum name gone, they were now performing as Truck. They had also formed a working relationship with music producer Dennis Murphy and Sun Dog Productions. To celebrate Sundog Production's acquisition of the group and bring them to the attention of the right people in the music business, promoter Michele Frank had organized an event which took place on April 19, 1972. It was held at Thunder Sound Studios. In addition to the event's organization, Frank's efforts had been put into sorting the public relations and getting those key industry people to come. Another attendee was Skip Prokop from the group Lighthouse who was there to witness the occasion. Music magazine RPM Weekly reported on the event, and included a photo with the article in its May 6 issue. Pictured were members, Brian Wray, Jimmy Roberts, Larry Ernewein, Joey Miquelon, Mike Curtis, and Graham Lear. Also pictured were managers Clark Spencer, Peter Francey, and Dennis Murphy of Sun Dog Productions. There was also mention of Murphy and Sun Dog Productions releasing an album of the group in the near future.

Performing live, the group appeared at Ontario Palace. Their second appearance in 2 weeks was locked in for June 10 in an event MC'd by Wayne DeVeau of CFPL-TV. Other acts scheduled to appear included The Men's Chorus of S.P.E.B.S.Q.S.A and brother and sister comedy, act Paul Brothers and Shirley. At the end of the month they were expected to start work on their album with producer Dennis Murphy.

Along the way they had lost one of their members and he had joined the nine-piece group Young. It was noted by RPM Weekly in the August 12 issue that the group was made up of former members from Truck, Natural Gas, Brass Union, and the Tom Jones Las Vegas Review, and they were ready to have a single released on the Ampex label.

In September 1972, a full page Magic Management advertisement appeared in Billboard. In addition to Truck, the other Magic Management artists listed were Christopher Kearney and The Good Bros. Included were their managers, Peter Francey and Clark Spencer with M. Frank Associates handling publicity and promotion and field representative, Tim Lawrence. Another ad in the same issue showed that their booking was handled by Concept 376 who also handled booking for April Wine, Leigh Ashford, The Good Brothers, Brutus, and The James Hartley Band.

Debut single

Now signed to Capitol Records in Canada, the group had recorded the single "October in Canada" bw "Rain" which was produced by Dennis Murphy at Thunder Sound Studios. It was reported in the October 14 issue of Record World that it was due for release that week. The A side was composed by the group's lead singer, Michael Curtis. When it came out it was presented in a sleeve with a red maple leaf and the title, "October in Canada" with truck underneath the label hole. The label however simply had the title as Canada.

Political mission

The group became involved in an aspect of politics. By the end of October, they had kicked off on a four day musical trip that was to serve the needs of the Canadian prime minister. As reported the October 28, 1972, issue of Billboard, Truck and fellow Magic Management act, The Good Brothers had been engaged by the Prime Minister's First-Time Voter Committee to be part of a youth-oriented tour. The four day trip involved being flown on the Prime Minister's Jet to play concerts at Ottawa, the Yukon, Winnipeg, Calgary, Whitehorse, Thompson, Vancouver, and Regina. This ploy by prime minister Pierre Trudeau was to use Truck and The Good Brothers to lure the in young voters. In between the political music events, Truck were to visit stations on route and promote their new single, then called "October in Canada".

Further activities in 1972

In December, the word from their management was that they had a heavy schedule of gigs ahead of them which included touring for a week with group, White Trash in mid-January, headlining at McGill in mid-February and a tour of colleges in the United States.

In addition to "Canada" bw "Rain" on Capitol 72679, the other single released that year was the Latin flavored "Get It Together" bw "Can’t Wait Until Tomorrow" on Capitol 72687.

That year bass player Larry Ernewein had left the group and was replaced by Jim Crichton. Michael Curtis had also left that year and became a member of Crazy Horse. Both he and his brother Rick replaced Crazy Horse members, George Whitsell and John Blanton. They played on the album, At Crooked Lake, with Michael contributing vocals, piano, organ, guitar, and mandolin.

=== 1973 ===
As indicated by Billboard in its January 6, 1973 issue, Truck's debut album was to be released by Capitol in mid-January. It was also reported by Billboard in the January 27 issue that Truck Music Limited, the company headed by Peter Francey had produced a 20 minute 16mm film of performances by their Capitol signed artists, Truck, Christopher Kearney, and The Good Brothers. The film was intended to promote the acts to potential clients and booking agencies.

Up until February 1973, the group had been playing weekly for three years. Now they had been taken off the road and placed into down-time by their bosses at Magic Management. According to the February 3, 1973, issue of Cash Box, they were to be unavailable for any personal appearances until after March 1. They were also relocating from London, Ontario, to Toronto. The time off was to be utilized with rehearsing new material, working on a professional stage presentation and preparing for the heavy schedule coinciding with the release of their album.

In early March, "Get it Together" was getting play on Ron Moore's play list at Radio Western in London, while "Can't Wait Until Tomorrow" was getting play on Ron Foster's play list at CKLW-FM in Windsor. By mid-March, "Get It Together" was on John Oliver's play list at CHEC in Lethbridge, a week later it was in the "Breakout Markets" section and on Ted Hayward's playlist at CJCJ Woodstock.

It was reported by the RPM Weekly in the March 17 issue that Ontario booking agency, Concept 376 would soon release an album featuring Truck and other acts, King Biscuit Boy, Leigh Ashford, Lighthouse, Ocean, and Pepper Tree.

The month of April saw the group ready to play at the "Save James Bay" fund benefit concert which was to include Peter, Paul & Mary, Ian and Sylvia, Joni Mitchell and some other Quebec acts. Indigenous presentations would also be part of the event. It was confirmed that Truck, Bruce Cockburn and Murray MacLauchlan did appear. The tour strategy had worked so far with the group going through eastern Canada and then to Ottawa throughout the Maritimes. They also had a date with the Musical Friends show on CFCF-TV. Then in mid-April, having been booked, they were to play at the Mad Mechanic in Toronto.

=== Album release ===
Also ahead of them in April was their press party which had been organized by Capitol Records to commemorate their album's release.

When their album, Truck was released, the credited musicians included Graham Lear on drums and percussion, Larry Ernewein on bass and backing vocals, Bill Usher on congas and bongos, Joey Miquelon (aka Joey Roberts) on guitar, Brian Wray on keyboards, flute and backing vocals, Michael Curtis on lead vocals, flute, acoustic guitar and percussion, and James Roberts on tenor saxophone, flute and organ. The album opened with "Rollin's On My Mind", which was co-written by Graham Lear with keyboardist Brian Wray. The rest of the tracks were all composed by the band. Side A tracks were "Rain", "People", "Can't Wait (Until Tomorrow)", "Please Don't Come Shining Your Light" and on Side B, "Sing a Song", "Get it Together", "Take a Look", "Ernie", and "Another Dream".

Airplay and charting

By April 7, it had been getting airplay on Harvey MacKinnon's list at DAL Radio in Halifax, and Charlotte Baxter's list at Radio Erindale in Clarkson. The following week, it was on Steve Shacher's play list at Radio Brockist in Catharines.

For the week of April 21, the album was still on Charlotte Baxter's list. That week marked the first charting of the album. It entered the RPM100 Albums Chart at #100. The following week it was at #98. By May 26, having spent six weeks in the charts it was at #85. With sales, the album had a fairly good run in the chart. Some members were at a record store in London. Keeping them in visually on the retail side and as well as in a magazine, two members of the group were pictured in the June 2 issue of RPM Weekly with Bob McBride and London's Mr. Sound store manager, Dave Redgers.

=== Further activities in 1973 ===
There had been some changes within the structure of their management company. By August 1973, Karen Quee had recently been appointed to a senior position in Magic Management, Toronto as director of public relations. She was coordinating publicity for the group as well as artist, Christopher Kearney. Working with Quee was Clark Spencer. Armed with promo kits and video tapes, they were launching a promotion campaign to get Truck, Craig Nicholson, Doug Brittain, Christopher Kearney, and the Good Brothers to the attention of more than 400 colleges in Canada as well as the US. They were also looking at setting up a US tour in the fall.

New line up

The December 22 issue of RPM Weekly listed a different line up from the one that recorded the album. The members at that time were Mike Langford on vocals, Neil Chapman on guitar, Marty Morin on drums, Jim Crichton on bass, and Todd Booth on keyboards and synthesizer. In November, they had been at the National Entertainment Conference that was held just outside New York at Grossinger's. Backstage after their set, they received in-person complements from Dave Brubeck. Having been on the road for two months, they just had a booking to play at the Abbey Road Pub from December 17 from through to the 22nd. Their plan was to stay in their home area for the remainder of the year, and prepare for their new show in 1974, and at the end of January, appear in New York for a series of dates.

- Guitarist Neil Chapman, drummer and vocalist Marty Morin had come in from a group called Heat Exchange.

=== 1974 ===
In June, they had some appearances lined up at the Piccadilly Tube in Toronto from the 24th to the 29th. In July, they were quite busy with dates set up to play at The Gasworks in Toronto from the 8th to the 13th, then Quebec City in Quebec from the 15th to the 21st. Then the New Electric Circle in Quebec City from the 22nd to the 28th and finally that month at Toronto's Abbey Road Pub from July 29 to August the 3rd. The band was booked in September to play at The Gasworks in Toronto from the 9th to the 14th.

Two members had left the band that year. They were drummer Marty Morin and vocalist Mike Langford.

Break up

After a series of line-up changes the group was said to have broken up in 1974.

== Discography ==
Singles
Act	Release	Catalogue	Year	Notes
Truck	"Canada" / "Rain"	Capitol 72679	1972	
Truck	"Get it Together" / "Can't Wait (Until Tomorrow)"	Capitol 72687	1972	

Album
Act	Release	Catalogue	Year	Notes
Truck	Truck	Capitol ST 6388	1973	

Various artists compilation appearances
Title	Track	Catalogue	Year	Notes
Concept	"People"	Concept 376 Limited PRP 171	1972	

== Later years ==
=== Sound Spectrum ===
After his time with the group, Sandy McKay played with the groups Persuasion, Tanis and Terry Dee's Flying Rock and Roll Circus. From 1980 to 1983, he was a regular on Janice Zolf hosted "Live from the Marienbad" show on FM96.

McKay would eventually go the jazz-direction like former truck members Brian Wray and Larry Ernewein. From 1984 to 1989, he played drums in The Oliver Whitehead Quintet. He also played drums from 1983 to 1998 with dance band, Hawthorne. In the mid-1980s, he appeared at various prestigious Canadian jazz festivals. Since 1986, he has been the Artistic Director of the Jazz for the People concert series which is held at the Wolf Performance Hall in London, Ontario. He also received a Forest City London Music Award in 2011.

Into the 2020s, he has been playing in an ensemble that includes Larry Ernewein.

=== Truck ===
By 1974, Graham Lear was a member of Gino Vannelli's backing band.

Brian Wray played on Moe Koffman's If You Don't Know Me By Now album which was released in 1982.

Percussionist Bill Usher was the 1987 winner of the Juno Award for Children's Album of the Year. In 2014, he received the Presenter of the Year award at the Pacific Contact booking conference and trade show in Burnaby.

Larry Ernewein would become a pilot after losing his main interest in music. It was in the mid-1970s that he started his learning to fly. He finally got his first real job as a flight instructor. In 1979, he became a pilot for Air Canada. In later years, he became the first Canadian to win the L. Paul Soucy award, and at age 67, one of the oldest recipients. He also ended up doing the aerobatic flying maneuvers for the film Amelia that starred Hilary Swank and Richard Gere. Even though he has pursued his interest in flying, he did continue his interest in music and played with various jazz bands. He is also the operator of Innerkip Aerodrome which is located 1.4 nautical miles north of Innerkip, Ontario, Canada.

== Line ups ==
Sound Spectrum early line up

- Dave Borland - trumpet
- Bill Caldwell - guitar
- Bruce Fleming - keyboards
- Sandy MacKay -drums
- Rob Oliver - saxophone

Truck album credited musicians May, 1973

- Michael Curtis - lead vocals, flute, acoustic guitar,
  percussion
- Larry Ernewein - bass, backing vocals
- Graham Lear drums, percussion
- Joey Miquelon (aka Joey Roberts) - guitar
- James Roberts - tenor saxophone, flute, organ
- Bill Usher - congas, bongos
- Brian Wray - keyboards, flute, backing Vocals

Truck later 1973 line up

- Neil Chapman - guitar
- Jim Crichton - bass
- Mike Langford - vocals
- Todd Booth - keyboards, synthesizer
- Marty Morin drums

Truck line up changes etc.

- Gord McKinnon - keyboards, vocals (replaced Wray)
- Mike Langford - vocals (replaced Curtis)
- Jim Crichton - bass (replaced Larry Ernewin 1972)
- Marty Morin - drums (replaced Graham Lear 1973)
- Todd Booth - keyboards (replaced McKinnon 1973)
- Neil Chapman - guitar (replaced Miquelon 1973)
- Paul DeLong - drums (replaced Marty Morin 1974)
- Michael Sadler - vocals (replaced Langford 1974)
