= Natural Gas (album) =

Studio album by Natural Gas
- Released: 1970
- Studio: RCA Studios, Montreal, Canada
- Label: Firebird FB 18
- Producer: Pat Jaques, Fran White

Natural Gas is an album by Canadian jazz rock group Natural Gas. It was their only album. It stayed in the Canadian charts for a period of time in 1970.

== Background ==
Natural Gas' debut album was recorded at RCA studios in Montreal in October, 1969. It was produced by the group's managers, Pat Jaques and Fran White who the group met in March that year. It was also mixed in New York. It was released in January, 1970. It was released in the United States some time before it got a Canadian release. It was also a front page pick by music magazines, Record World and Billboard.

A party was held in January at Broadway Recording Studios for the release of the group's album. It was attended by Gus Gossart, WCBS-FM Program Director, Dick Bozzi, WCBS-FM Music Director, Dan Goldberg, Music Editor of Record World, plus hosts, George and Sam Goldner of Firebird Records. Their song, "What Do You Want From My Life" was also getting attention. By March, that year, Modern Tape's Promotional Director, John Driscoll was ready to tour the Western Provinces to promote the group's LP album and their single, "All Powerful Man".

== Charts ==
For the week ending March 14th, the album entered the RPM100 albums chart at #82. For the week ending April 18, 1970 the album was at #66 on the RPM100 albums chart. For the week ending May 16, it was at the #55 spot.

The album also made the Top 50 in the United States.

== Release ==
Natural Gas Firebird FB 18 Track listing and details
| No. | Track | Composer | Time | Notes |
|---|---|---|---|---|
| A1 | "The All Powerful Man" | George Olliver | 6:04 | Arranged by Carl Watral |
| A2 | "What Do You Want From My Life" | George Olliver | 3:12 | Arranged by Carl Watral |
| A3 | "Live And Learn" | George Olliver | 6:29 | Arranged by Carl Watral |
| A4 | "Tribute To Rubber Boots" | George Olliver, Joey Chirowski | 4:40 | Arranged by Carl Watral, Dave Berman |
| B1 | "Eleanor Rigby" | Lennon & McCartney | 3:56 | Arranged by Brian Wray |
| B2 | "Leaders Of The World" | George Olliver | 4:45 | Arranged by Brian Wray, Dave Berman |
| B3 | "I Don't Want To Be Left Outside" | Ellie Greenwich, Mike Rashkow | 3:20 | Arranged by Carl Watral, Dave Berman |
| B4 | "Rameses I" | Carl Watral | 9:09 | Arranged by Brian Wray, Carl Watral, Graham Lear |

Group personnel
| Name | Role | Notes |
|---|---|---|
| Dave Berman | Soprano saxophone, alto saxophone, tenor saxophone, baritone saxophone, vocals | |
| Dave Classic | Trombone, bass trombone, vocals | |
| Leon Feigenbaum | Electric bass, fender bass, string bass | |
| Graham Lear | Percussion | |
| George Olliver | Lead vocals, organ | |
| Dave Tamblyn | Guitar, vocals | |
| Carl Watral | Trumpet, flugelhorn, vocals | |
| Brian Wray | Organ, piano, flute, vocals | |

Non musical personnel
| Name | Role | Notes |
|---|---|---|
| The Forlenza Group | Cover design | |
| Sam Goldner | Album coordinator | |
| William Hoffman | Liner notes | |
| Pat Jacques | Producer, mixer | |
| Idris Karp | Artwork | |
| Andre Sevigny | Audio engineer | |
| Fran White | Producer | |
