= Christopher Kearney =

Canadian singer and songwriter

- Also known as: Christopher Kearney
- Born: 6 December 1948 (age 77)
- Origin: Toronto, Ontario, Canada
- Genres: Rock music, folk music
- Occupation: Musician
- Instrument: Guitar
- Years active: 1970s to 2000s
- Labels: Apex, MCA, Capitol,
- Formerly of: China

Christopher Kearney is a Canadian singer and songwriter who kicked off his career after military service. He had a hit in 1970 with "Theme for Jody". He had more chart success with the single "Loosen Up".

== Background ==
Born in Toronto, Ontario, he was raised in the San Francisco Bay area. After military service in the Vietnam war, he returned to Toronto in the early 1970s. With some assistance from Gordon Lightfoot, his debut single was "A Theme for Jody", released in 1970. The follow-up single was "Country Lady" in 1971.

Having signed with Capitol and recorded three albums for the label, Christopher Kearney, Pemmican Stash and Sweetwater. He later joined with Danny McBride and Bill King to form the group China.

In 1972, he was chosen to represent Canada at the Brazil Song Festival.

He was managed by Magic Management which was formed in 1971 by Peter Francey and Clark Spencer. In addition to Kearney, they also managed Jay Telfer, The Good Brothers and Truck. Their subsidiary Slic Bros. took care of his promotion design and designed the cover for his album. He stayed with Magic management until around mid-1974.

== Career ==
By August, 1970, he was signed to Early Morning Productions and scheduled to appear at the Mariposa Folk Festival. Also in that month, his single "Theme for Jody" had been released on Apex 77113. By September 12, the song had moved from the previous position of #15 to #13 in the MAPL Top 50 Canadian chart. It was also at #71 in the RPM100 Singles chart.

=== 1972 ===
For the week ending June 24, 1972 his song "Loosen Up" was at #84 in the RPM100 singles chart. His album, Christopher Kearney was at #70 in the RPM100 album chart.

In September, 1972, a full page advertisement for Magic Management appeared in Billboard magazine showing their acts, Kearney, Truck and The Good Bros. being managed by Peter Francey and Clark Spencer, with M. Frank Associates handling publicity and promotion. It also had Tim Lawrence down as the field representative. By December 1972 it was noted by Billboard that he had been in the studio for the past two weeks with Dennis Murphy of Sundog Productions cutting his second album for Capitol. His latest single "Country Lady" was picking up speed at secondary stations. Capitol was planning a heavy promotion action with him appearing at Grumbles Coffee House. Michele Frank (M. Frank Associates) was handling his press publicity. A party for him and Ronnie Abramson was hosted by Capitol at the coffee house in mid December.

=== 1973 ===
In late January, 1973, it reported by Billboard in the January 27 issue that Magic Management's umbrella org., Truck Music Limited, the company headed by Peter Francey had produced a 20 minute 16mm film of performances by their Capitol signed artists, Truck, Christopher Kearney and The Good Brothers. The film was intended to promote the acts to potential clients and booking agencies.

By May, Dennis Murphy of Mattawa Publishing and Nigel Haines of Chrysalis Music Ltd. had cemented the agreement between the two companies for representation of Kearney in the UK with a view to expanding more internationally. Mattawa also handled publishing for Josh Onderisin, Truck and Jason.

As of August, Magic Management had placed Karen Quee as director of public relations. She was coordinating publicity for Kearney as well as the group Truck. Working with Quee was Clark Spencer. Armed with promo kits and video tapes, they were launching a promotion campaign to get Kearney, Truck, Craig Nicholson, Doug Brittain and the Good Brothers to the attention of more than 400 colleges in Canada as well as in the United States. They were also looking at setting up a US tour in the fall.

By September, the success that he had with his two Capitol LPs and his performance at the 1972 Maple Music Junket concert in Toronto had been noted. He was also set to take his first major United States tour. A song from his album, Pemmican, "Sarah's Stash" was being prepared for a September release.

=== 1974 to 1979 ===
Some time prior to June 7, Kearney and another act Hero left the Magic Management roster. In 1975, his single "Runnin' Child" was released.

== Later years ==
In 1993, Kearney he attracted publicity when he wrote "A Letter From Sarajevo" with Scott Lane and Neil Dobson. It appeared with a video about the plight of the children in war ravaged Sarajevo, Bosnia.

In 2008, he released his Just A Step Away album.
