= Rockabye Hamlet =

Rock musical

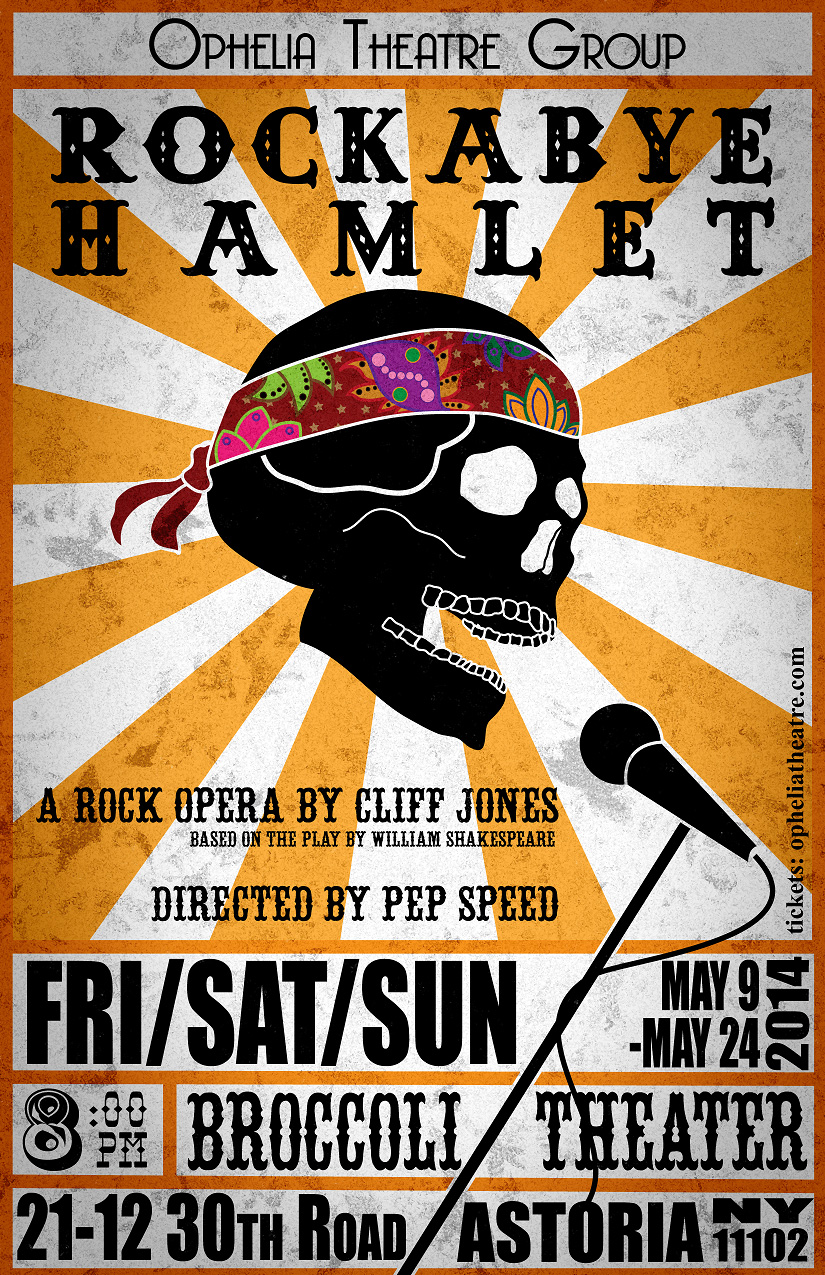
Rockabye Hamlet 2014 Ophelia Theatre Group poster

Rockabye Hamlet is a rock musical with a book, lyrics, and music by Cliff Jones. It is based on the classic tragedy by William Shakespeare and tells the story of a Danish prince who plots revenge on his uncle for killing his father.

== Production history ==
The show's original title was Kronborg: 1582. It was commissioned by the Canadian Broadcasting Corporation, which first broadcast it as an episode of the radio series The Entertainers on December 1, 1973. The cast included Cal Dodd as Hamlet and Nancy White as Ophelia. It was staged by the Charlottetown Festival in 1974 and 1975, then toured eastern Canada with Brent Carver as Hamlet and Beverly D'Angelo as Ophelia.

Jones revised the show and retitled it Rockabye Hamlet for a Broadway production that was staged as an all-out rock concert directed and choreographed by Gower Champion. After 21 previews, it opened on February 17, 1976 at the Minskoff Theatre and closed after seven performances. D'Angelo reprised her role of Ophelia, and the rest of the cast included Larry Marshall as Hamlet, Alan Weeks as Claudius, Leata Galloway as Gertrude, Kim Milford as Laertes, Rory Dodd as Horatio, Meat Loaf as the Priest, and Christopher Chadman and Winston DeWitt Hemsley as Rosencrantz and Guildenstern.

A studio cast recording featuring ten songs from the score was released on the Rising label. Vocals were provided by Cliff Jones, Rory Dodd, Cal Dodd, Lisa Hartt, and The Irish Rovers.

In 1981, Jones revised the show once again. It was staged as Somethin' Rockin' in Denmark at the Odyssey Theatre in Los Angeles. It had an 18-month run.

In the summer of 2008, with a revised script and score by Jones, it was presented at the St. Lawrence Centre for the Arts in downtown Toronto by Larry Westlake and capricorn 9 productions.

In September 2013, a revival workshop was produced through the Performing Arts Department at SUNY Cortland, directed by composer Cliff Jones and original cast member Terrie Robinson.

In May 2014, Ophelia Theatre Group based in Astoria, NY produced the first full revival of "Rockabye Hamlet" in Queens, directed by Pep Speed.

In July 2014, the Bizarre Noir Theatre Company staged the first Manhattan revival at The Players Theatre in Greenwich Village. Directed by P. William Pinto, this darker version of the piece utilized a combination of the original score, unused songs from the concept album, and newer compositions by Jones.

In the summer of 2017, The Charlottetown Festival produced a concert version of a completely reworked "Kronborg: 1582" at The Indian River Festival. With new orchestrations by Craig Fair, and starring Aaron Hastelow as Hamlet, Kristen Pottle as Ophelia, Cam MacDuffee as Claudius, Alanna Hibbert as Gertrude, and Connor Lucas as Laertes. The concert was restaged on the Mainstage of The Charlottetown Festival a month later with Adam Brazier as Laertes.

== Broadway song list ==
Act I

- Why Did He Have to Die?
- The Wedding
- That It Should Come to This
- Set It Right
- Hello-Hello
- Don't Unmask Your Beauty to the Moon
- If Not to You
- Have I Got a Girl for You
- Tis Pity, Tis True
- Shall We Dance
- All My Life
- Something's Rotten in Denmark
- Denmark Is Still
- Twist Her MInd
- Gentle Lover
- Where Is the Reason
- The Wart Song
- He Got It in the Ear
- It Is Done

Act II

- Midnight-Hot Blood
- Midnight Mass
- Hey....!
- Sing Alone
- Your Daddy's Gone Away
- Rockabye Hamlet
- All By Yourself
- The Rosencrantz & Guildenstern Boogie
- Laertes Coercion
- The Last Blues
- Didn't She Do It for Love
- If My Morning Begins
- Swordfight
