= As the Years Go By =

- The 45rpm vinyl cover of "Days When We Are Free / As the Years Go By".

Single by Mashmakhan

from the album Mashmakhan
- A-side: "Days When We Are Free"
- Released: 1970
- Recorded: 1970
- Studio: Columbia B Studios
- Genre: Rock fusion
- Length: 3:03
- Label: Columbia (Canada); Epic (US); CBS (Netherlands and Spain); CBS/Sony (Japan)
- Songwriter: Pierre Sénécal
- Producer: Billy Jackson

Mashmakhan singles chronology
"As the Years Go By" (1970)	"Gladwin" (1970)

Japanese cover
- Cover as used in Japan: "Kiri no Naka no Futari" (霧の中の二人; lit. "Two in the Fog")

Spanish cover
- Cover as used in Spain: Según pasan los años

"As the Years Go By" is the first single by rock fusion band Mashmakhan from their self-titled debut album. The single was recorded in Columbia B Studios and was released as the first single to Mashmakhan's self-titled debut album. The other single "Days When We Are Free" was used as the A-side to the 45rpm. "As the Years Go By" was also fit into several compilation albums of '70s songs.

The single, which sold over one million copies worldwide and received a gold disc, was very well received by the public and the critics, despite its eerie minor key tune. Allmusic critic Lindsay Planer also praised the single's sales and its lyrics, which touch on the meaning of love at various ages in life.

The song spent 18 weeks on the Billboard Hot 100 and peaked at number 31 on November 21 and 28, 1970. It reached as high as number 75 in Australia.

The single was released as "Kiri no Naka no Futari" (霧の中の二人; lit. "Two in the Fog") in Japan.

== History ==
In 1970, "As the Years Go By" was originally recorded by Mashmakhan in Columbia B Studios. "As the Years Go By" was released as the debut single of Mashmakhan's upcoming self-titled album. "As the Years Go By" was released in an edited form, with the latter single "Days When We Are Free" as the A-side. Following "As the Years Go By" the previously mentioned single and "Gladwin" were released. The self-titled debut Mashmakhan was released as an LP album in 1970. Later the single appeared on several rock compilation albums. "As the Years Go By" was first included in Rock Artifacts, Vol. 1 in 1990. On November 9, 1995, "As the Years Go By" plus the whole Mashmakhan album and its follow up album The Family were included in the compilation Mashmakhan/The Family. On April 24, 2001, "As the Years Go By" was also released on the Rock Treasures compilation by the Sony Music Entertainment. And lastly, "As the Years Go By" was used in the Japanese compilation The 70's, Vol. 3 by Universal Music Group of Japan on December 15, 2007.

The song was covered by the Florida-based salsa/funk band Coke on the 1972 self-titled debut, for which the lyrics and title were translated into Spanish: "Que Seria de Mi".

== Track listing ==
Both of the songs were produced by Billy Jackson.

A-side
No.	Title	Composers	Length
1.	"Days When We Are Free"	Rayburn Blake, Brian Edwards, Jerry Mercer, Pierre Sénécal	6:11

B-side
No.	Title	Composers	Length
2.	"As the Years Go By"	Pierre Sénécal	3:03
Total length:			9:14

== Reception ==
At its release, the single sold 100,000 copies in Canada, 500,000 copies in the United States, and over 1,000,000 copies in Japan. The single cracked the national charts in both Canada (#1 – singles (RPM 100) chart 2 weeks, CatCon chart 7 weeks) and the United States (#31). "As the Years Go By" sold over one million copies globally and received a gold disc. The single was generally well received by critics. Allmusic critic Lindsay Planer stated that "As the Years Go By" not only became their biggest hit but it also became "a million-seller in (of all places) Japan" and that the lyrics "are undeniably puerile," and texturally the "connotations of the word 'love' remain eternal."
