= Peter Francey =

Music director

Peter Francey was the co-director of a music management company, Magic Management who in the early to mid-1970s managed some prominent Canadian rock music artists. He was the publisher of at least two magazines relating to entertainment. He later moved into software package design and consultancy as co-director of several companies. In the 1970s one of his companies was nominated three times for a Juno Award in relation to their work. During the 1980s, another company of his was selected by Time Magazine for one of the top ten designs in the software field.

== Background and career ==
Francey and partner Clark Spencer formed Magic Management in 1970. It was the umbrella org. for Slic Brothers, a company that designed music promotion paraphernalia and album covers. The company designed record jackets for artists such as Peter Foldy, Greaseball Boogie Band, Moe Koffman, The Stampeders and Jay Telfer

His company Magic Management has the following artists on their roster, Jeff Addams, Terry Dee, The Good Bros., Hero, Hit & Run, Christopher Kearney, Truck, Jay Telfer, Touchstone, Lisa Hart, and West.

In February 1974, Billboard wrote that Francey had published the first issue of an entertainment magazine called Night Out. The editor was Margo Raport.

For the work that his company, Slic-Bros. produced, they had three Juno nominations. These included nominations for best LP graphics, and a "service publication acknowledging Toronto as the entertainment capital of Canada, Night Out magazine.

== Post music ==
Francey was a partner in the Spencer Francey Group who were selected by Time Magazine in 1986 for producing one of the Ten Best Designs on their package design for Ability Software. In the early 2000s, Peter Francey was an executive in the Toronto-based consultancy, Spencer Francey Peters which was founded in 1991 resulting from the merger of Michael Peters Group and Canadian design consultancy Spencer Francey. Also described as a graphic design firm specializing in corporate communications and package design, its roots went back to a Toronto company, Fifty Fingers that was founded in 1975. In 2004, Francey and co. sold the business to Cundari SFP. They left in November, 2009 and formed Trajectory, a new independent branding agency.

As of 2006, he was the president of president of Cundari SFP.
