= Brian Dickinson =

Canadian pianist (born 1961)

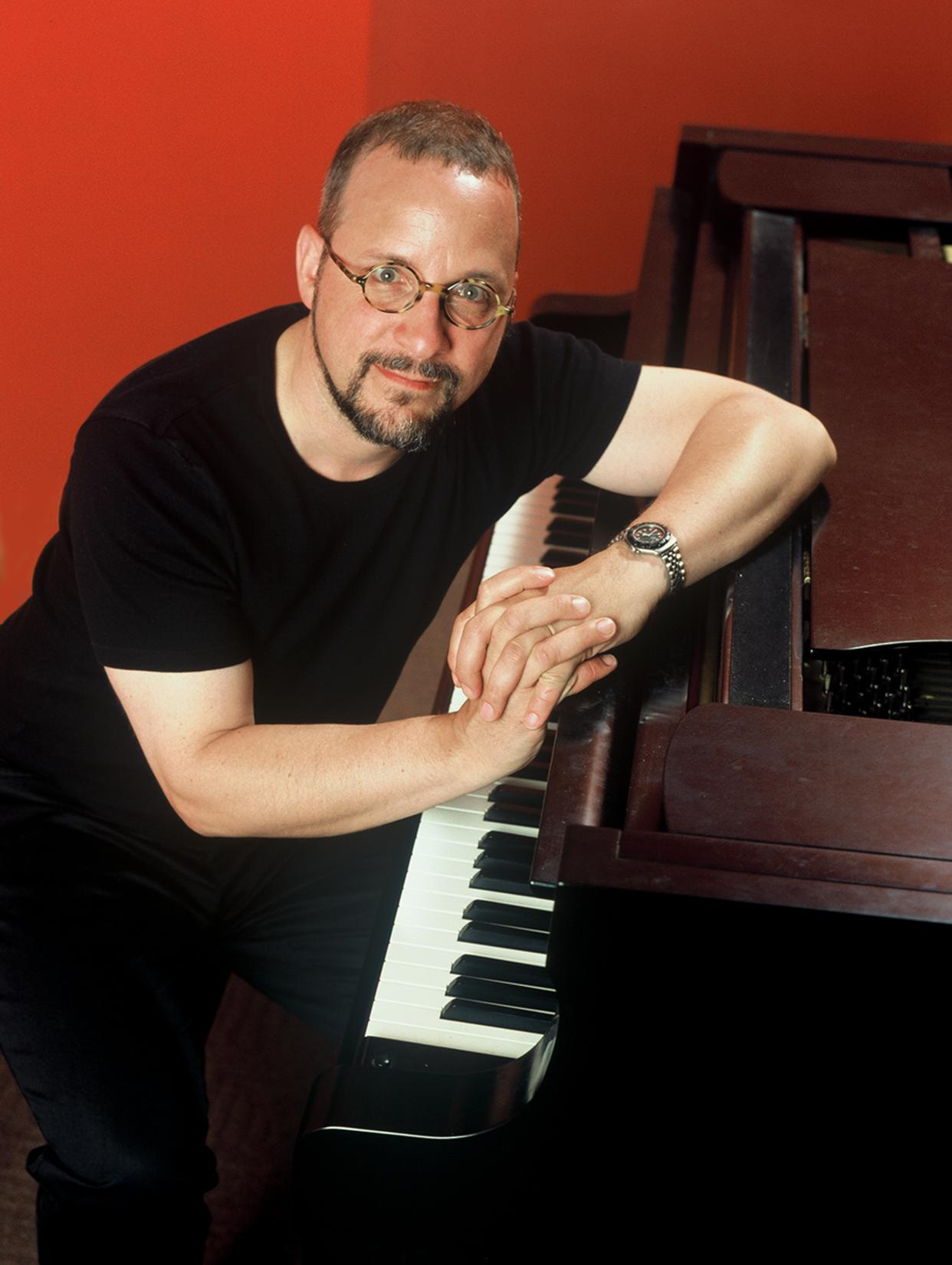

Background information
- Born: 1961 (age 64–65); Guelph, Ontario, Canada
- Genres: Jazz
- Occupations: pianist; composer; musician

Brian Dickinson (born 1961 in Guelph, Ontario) is a Juno Award-winning pianist.

== Career ==
Dickinson was part of the backing group for Carol McCartney. Other musicians were Kieran Overs on bass, Frank DiFelice on drums and Chris Robinson on saxophone. McCartney was one of the headline acts for The Brantford International Jazz Festival that ran from the 14th to 16 September 2013.

Along with Terry Clarke on drums, Lorne Lofsky on guitar, Mike Malone on flugelhorn, Kieran Overs on bass, and Chris Robinson on tenor saxophone and alto saxophone, He played piano on Carol McCartney's Be Cool album. Which was released in 2014 Some of the arrangements were handled by Brian Wray. However the majority of arranging was taken care of by Dickinson.
