= Francey =

Francey is a Swiss German surname. Notable people with the surname include:

- David Francey (born 1954), Canadian folk singer-songwriter
- Micheline Francey (1919–1969), French film actress
- Peter Francey, Canadian music manager
