= Into Existence =

Studio album by Rides Again
- Released: October 2, 2007
- Genre: Rock; Pop
- Length: 33:01
- Label: Put It On
- Producer: Eric Ratz; Gavin Brown; Harry Hess

Rides Again chronology
Wonder Why (EP) (2006)	Into Existence (2007)	TBA (2008)

Professional ratings
Review scores
Source	Rating
eMusic	4.5/5 stars

Into Existence is the first full-length album by the Canadian rock band Rides Again. It was released on October 2, 2007, with the first single being "Wonder Why" which was produced by Gavin Brown, known for also producing for Billy Talent and Three Days Grace. Videos and singles followed for Infected and It's Too Late, which received play on MuchMoreMusic. "Infected" became a top 10 modern rock hit in Canada.

== Track listing ==
No.	Title	Length
1.	"It's Too Late"	3:24
2.	"Wonder Why"	3:26
3.	"Infected"	2:53
4.	"Apology"	3:41
5.	"Love Again"	3:38
6.	"Let Down"	3:08
7.	"Fly Away"	4:27
8.	"Bury Your Own"	4:16
9.	"Faces"	4:05

=== Bonus Tracks (Japanese Import) ===
No.	Title	Length
1.	"Hey Amber (Demo)"	2:56
2.	"Inside Out (Live)"	3:44

== Singles ==
- "Wonder Why"
- "Infected"
- "It's Too Late"

== Personnel ==
- Chad Peyton – vocals, bass guitar
- Mike McElroy – drums
- Nathan Peyton – vocals, guitar
- Pete Lesperance – acoustic guitar
- Produced by Rides Again, Eric Ratz, Gavin Brown and Harry Hess
- Engineered by Chad Peyton, Eric Ratz and Harry Hess
