= Mashmakhan (album) =

Studio album by Mashmakhan
- Released: 1970
- Recorded: 1970
- Studio: Columbia B Studios
- Genre: Progressive rock, psychedelic rock
- Label: Columbia (Canada); Epic Records (US); CBS (other regions)
- Producer: Billy Jackson

Mashmakhan chronology
Mashmakhan (1970)	The Family (1971)

Singles from Mashmakhan
- 1. "As the Years Go By" Released: 1970; 2. "Gladwin" Released: 1970; 3. "Days When We Are Free" Released: 1971

Mashmakhan is the debut studio album by Canadian rock band Mashmakhan. Mashmakhan debuted with the single "As the Years Go By" which became a major success selling millions of copies around the world. After three singles, Mashmakhan released their self-titled debut LP album. The album reached #10 on the Canadian RPM Singles Chart and stayed on the chart for 35 consecutive weeks. After the album was released the group released their second album entitled The Family. Later, tracks from the album were featured in several different '70s rock compilation albums as well as two were sampled in some rap tracks. The album was also well received by critics getting a four out of five star review from AllMusic.

== Release and promotion ==
Mashmakhan debuted with the single "As the Years Go By" which became a smash hit and was released in an edited form. The single sold 100,000 copies in Canada, 500,000 copies in the United States, and over 1,000,000 copies in Japan. The single was followed by the other singles, "Days When We Are Free" and "Gladwin." The self-titled debut album was released in 1970 in Canada in LP format as Columbia Records, catalog number ELS-365. US releases were on Epic Records number E 30235. After their debut album was released, the follow-up album The Family was released in 1971 and bombed. This was released in Canada on Columbia as ES-90000, and in the US as Epic E 30813. The group broke up shortly after.

Several songs were later included in different compilation albums with the first being "As the Years Go By" which was included in Rock Artifacts, Vol. 1 in 1990. On November 9, 1995, Mashmakhan and its follow-up album, The Family, were included in the compilation album Mashmakhan/The Family. On April 24, 2001, "As the Years Go By" was released on the Rock Treasures compilation by the Sony Music Entertainment. On July 1, "Days When We Are Free" was included as part of the compilation The Rubble Collection, Volumes 1-10. The song "Afraid of Losing You" was included in the David Holmes compilation Cherrystone: Hidden Charms on June 22, 2004. And lastly, "As the Years Go By" was used in the Japanese compilation The 70's, Vol. 3 by Universal Music Group of Japan on December 15, 2007.

== Critical reception ==
Professional ratings
Review scores
Source	Rating
AllMusic	4/5 stars
The Village Voice	D

In a retrospective review, AllMusic critic Lindsay Planer stated that Mashmakhan blended "intricate progressive rock" and "resilient jazz fusion-inspired rhythms" and that Mashmakhan "consistently came up with brilliant material, rivalling many of their American contemporaries." Lindsay stated that "Days When We Are Free" kicks off Mashmakhan with a "rousing and assertive groove" steeped in "percussive funk, showing off just what they are capable of." Lindsay also stated that "I Know I've Been Wrong" begins with a "moody introduction, dominated by Senecal's punctuating organ inflections" as they shore up the "mid-tempo backbeat" and that "As the Years Go By" not only became their biggest hit but it also became "a million-seller in (of all places) Japan" and that the lyrics "are undeniably puerile," and texturally the "connotations of the word 'love' remain eternal."

== Sampling in hip hop ==
Some songs from the album have been sampled by hip hop musicians. In 1991, the track "I Know I've Been Wrong" was sampled by rap duo Black Sheep, for the track "Gimme The Finga" from their album A Wolf in Sheep's Clothing. Also in 2004, the track "Happy You Should Be" was sampled by rapper MF Doom for the song "Vomitspit" from the album Mm..Food.

== Track listing ==
No.	Title	Writer(s)	Length
1.	"Days When We Are Free"	Rayburn Blake, Brian Edwards, Jerry Mercer, Billy Jackson	6:11
2.	"I Know I've Been Wrong"	Pierre Senecal	4:47
3.	"As the Years Go By"	Senecal	3:03
4.	"Shades of Loneliness"	Senecal	4:46
5.	"Afraid of Losing You"	Senecal	4:07
6.	"Gladwin"	Blake	4:23
7.	"If I Tried"	Senecal	4:33
8.	"Happy You Should Be"	Senecal	4:47
9.	"Nature's Love Song"	Senecal	3:49
10.	"Letter From Zambia"	Senecal	6:11

== Personnel ==
- Rayburn Blake – guitars, backing vocals
- Pierre Senecal – organ, backing vocals, piano, flute, soprano saxophone, arrangements
- Brian Edwards – bass, lead vocals
- Jerry Mercer – drums, backing vocals
