= Mashmakhan/The Family =

Compilation album by Mashmakhan
- Released: November 9, 1995
- Recorded: 1970, 1971
- Genre: Rock fusion
- Length: 74:03
- Label: Collectables
- Producer: Billy Jackson

Mashmakhan chronology
The Family (1971)	Mashmakhan/The Family (1995)

Alternative cover

Mashmakhan/The Family is a 1995 album by the Canadian rock band Mashmakhan, compiling both of their early 1970s albums.

== Production ==
Mashmakhan debuted in 1970 with three singles, "As the Years Go By", "Gladwin" and "Days When We Are Free", which were compiled into their self-titled debut album. Mashmakhan later launched their second album, The Family in 1971, which had little-to-no success, Mashmakhan started to realise that fact, and broke up shortly after. In 1995, both of the albums, were compiled into one compact disc for the first time. However, the last track of The Family, "Mr. Tree", was cut off due to time restraints.

== Track listing ==
No.	Title	Length
1.	"Days When We Are Free" (from the album Mashmakhan)	6:11
2.	"I Know I've Been Wrong" (from the album Mashmakhan)	4:47
3.	"As the Years Go By" (from the album Mashmakhan)	3:03
4.	"Shades of Loneliness" (from the album Mashmakhan)	4:46
5.	"Afraid of Losing You" (from the album Mashmakhan)	4:07
6.	"Gladwin" (from the album Mashmakhan)	4:23
7.	"If I Tried" (from the album Mashmakhan)	4:33
8.	"Happy You Should Be" (from the album Mashmakhan)	4:47
9.	"Nature's Love Song" (from the album Mashmakhan)	3:49
10.	"Letter From Zambia" (from the album Mashmakhan)	6:11
11.	"Children of the Sun" (from the album The Family)	3:29
12.	"The Family" (from the album The Family)	5:10
13.	"The Prince" (from the album The Family)	5:13
14.	"Come Again" (from the album The Family)	4:36
15.	"Children Laughing" (from the album The Family)	3:34
16.	"Couldn't Find the Sun" (from the album The Family)	2:41
17.	"Start All Over" (from the album The Family)	3:43

== Reception ==
Professional ratings
Review scores
Source	Rating
Allmusic	4.5/5 stars

The album was well received by critics, receiving a four and a half out of five star review from Allmusic. Allmusic critic and writer Keith Pettipas stated in his review, "Looking back, Mashmakhan was ahead of their time; they did progressive rock for a commercial audience," while progressive rock is primarily used for underground music. Pettipas went on and said Mashmakhan incorporated "flutes and strings" when "hard rock was dominant" and they were "one of the first Canadian acts to become international stars."

== Personnel ==
- Rayburn Blake – guitar, vocals
- Pierre Senecal – guitar, keyboards, saxophone, vocals, wind, woodwind
- Brian Edwards – bass, vocals
- Jerry Mercer – drums, vocals
