= Searching Tonight for Answers =

Searching Tonight For Answers

EP by Rides Again
- Released: 2006
- Genres: Alternative rock, punk rock
- Length: 23:03

Rides Again chronology
Rides Again (2004)	Searching Tonight For Answers (2006)	Wonder Why (EP) (2007)

Searching Tonight for Answers is the first EP by Rides Again. The album includes the first version of the song, "Bury Your Own", longer than the version included on the band's third album Into Existence. It also includes an earlier version of "Free Fall" that is included on the demo EP Wonder Why.

== Track listing ==
1. Bury Your Own – 4:21
2. How It Feels – 3:47
3. Free Fall - 3:12
4. Yours – 3:56
5. Searching Tonight for Answers – 3:34
6. Operator – 4:11

== Bury Your Own ==
The wailing in "Bury Your Own" on the album, Into Existence, is used as secondary sound. In this album, the track includes wailing as part of the vocals. The guitar solo at the end of the song is also longer on this album compared to Into Existence.
