= Larry Ernewein =

Canadian musician and pilot

- Origin: Canada
- Genres: Rock, jazz rock, jazz
- Occupations: Musician, pilot, aerodrome operator
- Instrument: Bass guitar
- Years active: 1970s to present
- Member of: The Nevin Campbell Trio
- Formerly of: Truck; Jennifer Thorpe Quartette

Larry Ernewein is an active jazz musician and a pilot. During the 1970s he was a member of the Canadian jazz-rock group, Truck. He is also the owner, operator of Innerkip Aerodrome. He is also a judge and competitor in aerobatic competitions.

== Background ==
In the early 1960s, as youngsters, Larry Ernewein and three of his friends were paid $5 a piece to pull down wrestling rings at the CKCO-TV studio and get bandstand sets in place.

Passionate about music at a young age, Larry Ernewein joined the rock group Truck when he left high school.

A former Air Canada pilot, he has been competing in flying completions since the mid-1980s. An aerobatic judge and contest director, he once directed the Canadian National Aerobatic Championships. In 2018, and at age 67, he won the L. Paul Soucy Award. He was also the first Canadian to do so.

== Music ==
By 1972, Ernewein was a member of Truck. Along with members, Brian Wray, Jimmy Roberts, Joey Miquelon, Mike Curtis and Graham Lear, he was pictured in the May 6 issue of RPM Weekly. While in the band, the album they recorded spent six weeks in the chart. He left the band in 1972 and was replaced by Jim Chricton.

Like former members of Truck, Sandy McKay (when Truck was Sound Spectrum) and Brian Wray, Ernewein would gravitate towards jazz.

In 2010, he was part of the backing band for After Four which was made up of Jenny Nauta, Theresea Wallis, Dave Nauta and Dave WIlliams. They recorded an album, An After Four Christmas. The backing band included Fred Blaumas on guitar, Don DiCarlo on piano, Alex Ernewein on piano, himself on bass, Ken Foster on saxophone, Rob Larose on percussion, Sandy McKay on drums, Rona Nauta on synthesizer, Charles Rallo on piano and Dave Williams on piano. The group were winners of the 1st Annual Jack Richardson Awards for Best Jazz Vocal Group. Drummer Sandy MacKay was from Sound Spectrum, the early version of Truck.

In 2018, Ernewein was pictured on Facebook with former Truck bandmate Jimmy Roberts, Dave Beatty and Neil Nickafor. The photo was in a studio where Beatty and Roberts had been recording.

In 2019, along with Chris Norley on guitar and Richard Brisco on drums, he was playing bass behind Jennifer Thorpe as part of the Jennifer Thorpe Quartet.

He was a Forest City London Music Awards nominee in 2020.

== Aviation ==
Having lost some of his passion for music, he turned his interests to flying. He started learning to fly in the mid-1970s. His first real job was working a flight instructor. In 1979, he became a pilot for Air Canada.

He worked on the 2009 film, Amelia that starred Hilary Swank and Richard Gere doing some of the aerobatic flying maneuvers.

In 2015, he was participating in the fifth-annual Bill Thomas U.S./Canada Aerobatic Challenge, flying thousands of feet of above the Cattaraugus County-Olean Airport. With a crowd of anxious onlookers on the ground, he cut the engine of his homemade Bücker-Jungmann and sent it into a free fall. A few seconds later the engine kicked in and he pulled the plane up safely. Also that year, Space Shuttle astronaut, Bjarni Tryggvason flew with him in his Bücker Jungmann.

== Current ==
He operates the Innerkip Aerodrome which is located 1.4 nautical miles north of Innerkip, Ontario, Canada.

He is now part of the Nevin Campbell Trio which is made up of Campbell on piano, himself of bass and former Sound Spectrum drummer Sandy McKay.

== Discography ==
Albums
Act	Release	Catalogue	Year	Role	Notes
Truck	Truck	Capitol ST 6388	1973	Bass guitar	Vinyl LP
After Four	An After Four Christmas	CD Baby 0829982113924	2010	Bass guitar	Compact disc
