= Marathon (Santana album) =

Studio album by Santana
- Released: September 1979
- Studios: The Automatt, San Francisco, California
- Genres: R&B; rock; jazz fusion
- Length: 40:37
- Label: Columbia
- Producers: Keith Olsen, Santana, David DeVore

Santana chronology
Inner Secrets (1978)	Marathon (1979)	Zebop! (1981)

Singles from Marathon
- 1. "You Know That I Love You" Released: 1979

Professional ratings
Review scores
Source	Rating
AllMusic	2/5 stars
Christgau's Record Guide	C
Rolling Stone	2/5 stars

Marathon is the eleventh studio album by Santana. This marked the beginning of the group's commercial slide, in spite of having the Top 40 hit "You Know That I Love You".

Alex Ligertwood, who would sing with the group throughout the 1980s, joined the group for this album.

== Track listing ==
=== Side one ===
1. "Marathon" (Carlos Santana) – 1:28
2. "Lightning in the Sky" (Santana, Chris Solberg) – 3:52
3. "Aqua Marine" (Alan Pasqua, Santana) – 5:35
4. "You Know That I Love You" (Alex Ligertwood, Pasqua, Santana, Solberg) – 4:26
5. "All I Ever Wanted" (Ligertwood, Santana, Solberg) – 4:02

=== Side two ===
1. "Stand Up" (Santana, Solberg) – 4:02
2. "Runnin" (David Margen) – 1:39
3. "Summer Lady" (Ligertwood, Pasqua, Solberg) – 4:23
4. "Love" (Santana, Solberg) – 3:22
5. "Stay (Beside Me)" (Santana) – 3:50
6. "Hard Times" (Ligertwood, Margen, Pasqua) – 3:57

== Personnel ==
- Alex Ligertwood – lead vocals
- Carlos Santana – guitars, backing vocals
- Chris Solberg – guitars, keyboards, backing vocals
- Alan Pasqua – keyboards, backing vocals
- David Margen – bass
- Graham Lear – drums
- Armando Peraza – percussion (timbales), backing vocals
- Raul Rekow – percussion (congas), backing vocals

== Charts ==
Chart (1979–1980)	Peak position
Australian Albums (Kent Music Report)	9
Canada Top Albums/CDs (RPM)	52
Dutch Albums (Album Top 100)	21
Finnish Albums (The Official Finnish Charts)	13
French Albums (SNEP)	5
German Albums (Offizielle Top 100)	40
Japanese Albums (Oricon)	31
New Zealand Albums (RMNZ)	14
Norwegian Albums (VG-lista)	14
Swedish Albums (Sverigetopplistan)	15
UK Albums (Official Charts)	28
US Billboard Top LPs & Tape	25
US Soul LPs (Billboard)	39

== Certifications ==
Region	Certification	Certified units/sales
France (SNEP)	Gold	100,000^{*}
United Kingdom (BPI)	Silver	60,000^{^}
United States (RIAA)	Gold	500,000^{^}
^{*} Sales figures based on certification alone.^{^} Shipments figures based on certification alone.
