= All Powerful Man =

Single by Natural Gas

from the album Natural Gas
- B-side: "What Do You Want From My Life"
- Released: 1970
- Label: Firebird FR 1806
- Songwriter(s): George Olliver
- Producer(s): Pat Jaques, Fran White; Arranger: A side Brian Wray, B side Carl Watral

"All Powerful Man" is a song by Canadian jazz-rock group, Natural Gas. Composed by George Olliver and released in 1970, it was the group's only single and only hit.

== Background ==
Music magazine Record World reported in their January 24, 1970 issue that the group's single "All Powerful Man" on "What Do You Want From My Life" would be released in the near future. A party for the release of the group's album was held at Broadway Recording Studios. The attendees were Gus Gossart, WCBS-FM Program Director, Dick Bozzi, WCBS-FM Music Director, Dan Goldberg, Music Editor of Record World, plus hosts, George and Sam Goldner of Firebird Records. Another song, "What Do You Want From My Life" from the group's album which was the B-side of the single was also getting attention.

A tour was planned for March 1970 to promote the group's LP album and the single. Modern Tape's Promotional Director, John Driscoll would undertake the task of visiting Western Provinces in the process.

== Charts ==
"All Powerful Man" spent a total of seven weeks in the Canadian charts, peaking at 76 on May 9, 1970. It did better in the Canadian Top 50 Content chart where it was at 12 on that date.
