= Freedom North =

1970s Canadian rock group

- Also known as: Freedom, Freedom of Choice
- Origin: Montreal, Canada
- Genre: Rock
- Years active: 1970s
- Label: Aquarius Records
- Spinoff of: The Munks
- Past members: Franki Hart; Bill Hill; Eddie Kaye; Les Leroux; Rick St. Jean

Freedom North was a Canadian rock group that was active in the 1970s. Recording for Aquarius Records, they had hits with "Doctor Tom" and "Losing You".

== Background ==
The group had evolved from a previous group called The Munks who were around from 1963 to around 1968. During that time they recorded three songs. Now in the 1970s the new group was billing themselves as Freedom. They released their first single under that name. Some months later they were calling themselves Freedom North. The band consisted of Franki Hart, Bill Hill, Eddy Kaye, Graham Lear, Les Leroux and Rick St. Jean.

== Career ==
In 1970, their single "Dr. Tom" was released on the Aquarius label. By August 1, it was at #20 on the RPM100 singles chart. It was also at #2 on the MAPL Top 50 Canadian Chart. It would eventually peak at #17.

On August 24, 1970 "Losing You" was at #47 in the MAPL Top 50 Canadian Chart. With their single "Losing You" being a recent happening, the group was set to play two nights at the Spectrum, a coffee hose at Bishop's University for the week ending November 21, 1970. The establishment was suffering due to lack of patronage, and it was hoped that a major group like Freedom North would encourage students to attend and remedy the situation. It was also to be the first time a major group was to play at the venue. At the time, the group's line up consisted of lead guitarist Billy Hill, guitarist Rick St-Jean, vocalist Franki Hart, drummer Graham Lear and a bass player who was formerly with The Buddy Miles Express.

=== Album ===
RPM Weekly wrote in the October 3 issue that Summerlea Music head, Brian Chater reported that a US release for "Losing You" was to be on the Scepter label. A simultaneous release for their album in Canada and the US was anticipated for the first part of October. The album was released on Aquarius AQR 501 that year. All the tracks but one was composed by the band. The non-band composition "Hey Carmen" was composed by R. Boileau. Produced by Bill Hill for Much Productions, the musicians playing on the album were, Franki Hart on vocals, piano and recorder, Bill Hill on lead guitar, Rick St. Jean on vocals and rhythm guitar, Eddie Kaye on drums, and Les Leroux on Bass. Additional musicians were Ron Dann on pedal steel, Brian Wray on piano and horn arrangements, Rayburn Blake on guitar, Carl Watral, Mike Berman and Dave Classic on horns.

=== Further activities ===
For the week ending, February 6, 1971, their single "Ordinary Man" had entered the RPM 100 Singles chart at #96.

== Post Freedom North ==
By 1973, Franki Hart was a member of the group, Riverson which also included Rayburn Blake and Brian Edwards who were from Mashmakhan, and Graham Lear. By February they had already played at the Place des Arts, the Grand Théâtre de Québec and in Toronto, and set to appear at the Drummondville Cultural Center on Thursday, February 8 at 8:30 a.m..

Bill Hill later produced the debut album for Aquarius label mates April Wine.

== Members ==
- Franki Hart: lead vocals, piano, recorder
- Bill Hill: lead guitar
- Rick St. Jean: rhythm guitar, vocals
- Eddie Kaye: drums
- Les Leroux: bass

== Discography ==
Canadian singles unless specified otherwise
Act	Song title	Release info	Year	Notes #
Freedom	"Doctor Tom" / "Fat Man"	Aquarius AQ 5005	1970	
Freedom North	"A Helping Hand" / "Le Jour De La Liberté"	Aquarius AQP 1000	197?	
Freedom North	"Losing You" / "Gone Forever"	Aquarius AQ 5006	1970	
Freedom North	"Ordinary Man" / "Sorry"	Aquarius AQ 5008	1970	
Franki Hart and Freedom North	"Gone Forever" / " Franki's Song"	Aquarius AQ 5015	1971	

Canadian album
Act	Song title	Release info	Year	Notes #
Freedom North	Freedom North	Aquarius Records AQR501	1970	
