= 11:30 =

Canadian dance-pop duo

- Born: November 30, 1980 (age 45)
- Genres: Dance-pop
- Years active: 1999–2001
- Label: Aquarius
- Past members: Toni Sherwood; Trish Sherwood

11:30 was a Canadian dance-pop duo from Montreal that consisted of identical twin sisters Toni and Trish Sherwood (born in 1980; the 11:30 refers to their birthdate, November 30).They are known for their hit single, “Olé Olé”.

== History ==
In 2000, the twins were signed to Aquarius Records and released their album, Olé Olé. The song "Olé Olé" was written and produced by their father, Dorian Sherwood, and was a Canadian top ten hit. "Let's Go All Night" was the second single released by the duo.

In 2001, 11:30 toured as an opening act for Aaron Carter. They also traveled to Sydney, Australia. Aquarius Records put together a group of musicians called 'Team Aquarius', which traveled to the 2000 Summer Olympics to help boost Toronto's bid for the 2008 Olympic Games.

In 2003, their song "Let's Go All Night" appeared on Latino Summer Dance 3, a dance album produced by the Russian label Tancevalnij Raj. "Olé Olé" and "Let's Go All Night" would appear on two other compilation albums by the same label.

In 2010, Toni Sherwood released the solo album Stop.

== Discography ==
=== Singles ===
Year	Song	Peak positions	Album
Year	Song	CAN	Album
2000	"Olé Olé"	10	"Olé Olé"
2000	"Let's Go All Night"	-	"Olé Olé"
"—" denotes a release that did not chart.
