= Brian Wray =

Canadian musician

- Born: Brian Francis Wray
- Origin: Canada
- Died: 2019
- Genres: Rock, jazz rock, jazz
- Occupation: Musician
- Instruments: Piano, organ, flute
- Years active: 1960s to 2010s
- Member of: Brian Wray Jazz Trio
- Formerly of: Five of a Kind; Natural Gas; Motherlode; Truck

Brian Wray was a veteran Canadian musician and musical arranger. He had been a member of three major Canadian bands, Natural Gas in the late 1960s, Motherlode and Truck in the early 1970s. He also worked with Lisa Hartt, Freedom North, Moe Koffman, David Johannesson and other artists. In later years he moved more towards the jazz genre.

== Background ==
Born Brian Francis Wray, coming from Montreal, he was an organ and piano player. He was once a member of the group Five of a Kind which also had a pre-Mashmakhan Brian Edwards in their line up. While he was a member of Natural Gas, he arranged the track "Eleanor Rigby", and arranged the band's hit "All Powerful Man". He had played piano and handled the horn arrangements on Freedom North's self-titled album that was released in 1970. He also played keyboards in Canadian singer, Lisa Hartt's first band.

Like former Truck members, Larry Ernewein and Sandy MacKay (When the band was called Sound Spectrum), Wray's later in life preference was playing jazz.

== Career ==
=== 1960s to 1970s ===
Five of a Kind

During the 1960s, Brian Wray was in the group Five of a Kind which also had a pre-Mashmakhan Brian Edwards in their line up.

Natural Gas

He joined George Olliver's group Natural Gas in May, 1969. In January, 1970 while Natural Gas were playing at the Laugh In on Victoria Street, Montreal, the group surprisingly played the "2001: A Space Oydessy" theme. Wrays keyboard playing was noted in an article, "Natural Gas a natural treat" by The Gazette with the writer saying "he plays piano and organ like a man who's being doing it for a long time" adding " adds just the right touch to the band". While in the band he played piano, organ, flute and added his vocals to the recordings. He did the arrangements on the A side of the single, "All Powerful Man" bw "What Do You Want From My Life" which was released on Firebird FR 1806. The single got to #76 on May 9, 1970, spending seven weeks in the Canadian charts. It also at #12 on the Top 50 Canadian Content chart on the same date. Their album that featured his arrangements on four tracks (two of them co-arrangements), got into the Canadian Top 10. It also made the Top 50 in the United States.

Motherlode

By March 1971, he was a member of the fifth version of Motherlode. The line up also included Dave Berman (saxophone), Brian Dewhurst (drums), Gerry Legault (bass, vocals), Joey Roberts aka Joey Miquelon (guitar). They didn't get around to recording any material and became part of Truck with the addition of Graham Lear.

Truck

In 1972, and now a member of Truck, he was part of the lineup which also included Jimmy Roberts, Larry Ernewein, Joey Miquelon, Mike Curtis and Graham Lear.

He composed the A side for the group's second single, "Get It Together" bw "Can't Wait (Until Tomorrow)", released on Capitol 72687 in 1972. The B side was composed by James O. Roberts. In early March, "Get it Together" was getting spun on Ron Moore's play list at Radio Western in London, while "Can't Wait Until Tomorrow" (the B side) was getting play on Ron Foster's play list at CKLW-FM in Windsor. By mid-March, "Get It Together" was on John Oliver's play list at CHEC in Lethbridge. The following week it was in the "Breakout Markets" section and on Ted Hayward's playlist at CJCJ Woodstock.

He also played on the album Truck which wasn't released until 1973. He co-wrote the opening track, "Rollin's On My Mind" with Graham Lear. The album entered the RPM100 Albums Chart at #100 on April 21, 1973. and at #85 was still charting on May 26.

At some stage in 1973, he left the band and was replaced by Gord McKinnon who was from the group Heat Exchange.

Further activities

In 1975, he was part of vocalist / flautist Jesse Foster's backing group that also included drummer Jim Norman, guitarist Mike Rodden and electric bassist Keith Jones. Their set called "Life Is Colour" was performed at the Percussion Festival, held at St. Pauls Annex Theatre in Toronto on June 29.

=== 1980s to 1990s ===
He played synthesizer on Moe Koffman's 1982 album, If You Don't Know Me by Now..., released in Canada on Elektra XE1-60046. The album which was produced by Domenic Troiano got a good review with Andy Gemza of Medium II saying that Brian Wray played superbly, finding a niche within the band which enabled him to be exploratory on the keyboards without taking anything away from the traditional jazz feel that is the norm for a Moe Koffman album. He added piano to Ralph Foster's Voice of Elvis album that was released in 1994. Along with vocalists Rena Gaile and Debbie Flemming, guitarist Brian Legere, bassist Jim Morgan, saxophonist John Macmurchy, Wray was one of the session men on David Johannesson's blues/rock album, Hard Times which was released on Mighty Joe Music MJM-CD111 in 1998.

=== 2000s ===
In December 2000, his group, The Brian Wray Jazz Trio was appearing at The Rex Jazz Bar. In June 2001, they were appearing at the Montreal Bistro. He helped with the arrangements on Canadian jazz singer, Carol McCartney's Be Cool album that was released in 2014.

== Death ==
According to George Olliver's post on 12 March 2019 at his George Olliver R&B/Blues Facebook page, Wray had died.

== Discography (selective) ==
Album
Act	Release	Catalogue	Year	Notes
Natural Gas	Natural Gas	Firebird FB 18	1970	Band member Arranger on "The All Powerful Man", "Eleanor Rigby", "Rameses I"
Freedom North	Freedom North	Aquarius Records AQR501	1970	Piano and horn arrangements
Truck	Truck	Capitol ST 6388	1973	Band member - keyboards, flute, vocals Co-composer "Rollin's On My Mind", "Sing A Song", "Take A Look"; Composer "Get It Together"
Moe Koffman	If You Don't Know Me by Now...	Elektra XE1-60046	1982	Synthesizer
Ralph Foster	Voice of Elvis	Snowball Records SBCD-9402	1994	Piano
David Johannesson	Hard Times	Mighty Joe Music MJM-CD111	1998	Keyboards, hammond organ
Carol McCartney	Be Cool	Moxy	2014	Arrangement on "'S Wonderful"
