= Hollowick =

Canadian rock band

- Origin: Oshawa, Ontario, Canada
- Genres: Rock
- Years active: 2004-current
- Label: Aquarius
- Past members: Nathan Peyton; Chad Peyton; Luke LeDoux; Frank Goerz; Mike McElroy; Bradley Christiansen
- Website: hollowickmusic.com

Hollowick is a Canadian rock band from Oshawa, formerly called Rides Again. It is composed of lead singer and guitarist Nathan Peyton, bassist and brother background vocalist Chad Peyton, and drummer Frank Goerz.

Their first full-length album, Into Existence, was released as Rides Again on 2 October 2007. The first single, "Wonder Why", was produced by Gavin Brown (known for producing other Canadian bands including Billy Talent and Three Days Grace). Videos and singles followed for Infected and It's Too Late, which received play on MuchMoreMusic. "Infected" became a top 10 modern rock hit in Canada. The band has toured with Theory of a Deadman, Social Code, The Trews and Hedley, Yellowcard among others.

A few years prior to Into the Existence, Rides Again gained recognition for their hit single “Geeze Louise,” a pop rock track that was particularly popular among young teens. At the time, the band was signed to Vodoo Records and performed across southern Ontario. The original drummer, Bradley Christiansen—cousin of Nathan and Chad—was part of the lineup but later left to pursue other career opportunities. By 2007, the band had gained wider exposure, with their music videos airing on MuchMusic and MuchMoreMusic, as well as receiving radio play across Canada.

In mid-2009, drummer Mike McElroy left the band to pursue other interests. He was briefly replaced by drummer Kelly Voelkel, who recorded all drum and percussion parts for Hollowick’s upcoming album. However, Voelkel departed in July 2009 to focus on professional opportunities. Anthony Moreino, a friend of the band and former merchandise manager, temporarily filled in on drums until a permanent replacement, Frank Goerz, was found.

By June 2010, the group began performing under the name “Hollowick,” with a revised lineup that included a new guitarist and drummer. Their album Beautiful People was released in 2011 and produced the singles “Time Bomb” and “There Goes Another One.”

Bassist Chad Peyton currently plays for Canadian country music award winner Meghan Patrick.

== Singles ==
- (Rides Again) "Wonder Why" - 2007
- (Rides Again) "Infected" - 2008
- (Rides Again) "It's Too Late" - 2008
- (Rides Again) "Apology" - 2008
- (Hollowick) "Time Bomb" - 2010
- (Hollowick) "There Goes Another One" - 2011

== Albums ==
- 2003 Save The World
- 2004 Rides Again
- 2006 Searching Tonight for Answers
- 2007 Into Existence
- 2011 Beautiful People
