= Hot Springs (band) =

Canadian indie rock band

- Hot Springs in performance

Background information
- Origin: Montreal, Quebec, Canada
- Years active: 2004-2008
- Past members: Rémy Nadeau-Aubin; Frédéric Sauvé; Giselle Webber

Hot Springs were a Canadian psychedelic indie-rock band based in Montreal, Quebec. They were unusual in the Montreal music scene, in that they had an equal fan-base within both the francophone and anglophone communities.

== History ==
Formed in the spring of 2004, Hot Springs featured Giselle Webber on vocals and guitar, Rémy Nadeau-Aubin on guitar, Frédéric Sauvé on bass and Anne Gauthier on drums (previously Karine Lauzon).

Hot Springs released their first EP, Rock Partouze in 2005. The band's track "Caco Disco" hit No. 1 on the local college charts, and they received MIMI (Montreal Independent Music Initiative) nominations in both the EP and Rising Star categories, and a number of radio and television spots within the francophone media circuit.

The band's first, and only, full-length album, Volcano was released on September 18, 2007, under Quire Records.

In October, 2008, Hot Springs disbanded when lead singer/songwriter Webber chose not to continue.

== Discography ==
=== EPs ===
Rock Partouze (2005)

1. Bacteria
2. Bet Number Two
3. Ici
4. Caco Disco
5. Kalamata

=== Albums ===
Volcano (2007)

1. Headrush
2. Cellophane
3. Fog and the Horn
4. Tiny Islands
5. Fantôme Dinosaure
6. Pink Money
7. Annimystique
8. Gotta DJ
9. Hary and Airee
10. 38th Adventure

== See also ==
- Music of Quebec
- Canadian rock
- List of Canadian musicians
- List of bands from Canada
- Category:Canadian musical groups
