= Amelia (film) =

- Theatrical release poster
- Directed by: Mira Nair
- Screenplay by: Ronald Bass; Anna Hamilton Phelan
- Based on: East to the Dawn by Susan Butler; The Sound of Wings by Mary S. Lovell
- Produced by: Ted Waitt; Kevin Hyman; Lydia Dean Pilcher
- Starring: Hilary Swank; Richard Gere; Ewan McGregor; Christopher Eccleston; Joe Anderson
- Cinematography: Stuart Dryburgh
- Edited by: Allyson C. Johnson; Lee Percy
- Music by: Gabriel Yared
- Production companies: Mirabai Films; 2S Films; Avalon Pictures; AE Electra Productions
- Distributed by: Fox Searchlight Pictures
- Release date: October 23, 2009
- Running time: 111 minutes
- Countries: United States; Canada
- Language: English
- Budget: $40 million
- Box office: $19.6 million

Amelia is a 2009 biographical film about the aviation pioneer Amelia Earhart. The film stars Hilary Swank as Earhart, and co-stars Richard Gere, Ewan McGregor, Christopher Eccleston and Joe Anderson. The film was directed by Mira Nair and based on The Sound of Wings by Mary S. Lovell. The film received negative reviews, with critics polarized over the performances and criticizing the film's story. It was also a box-office bomb, grossing $19.6 million against a budget of $40 million.

== Plot ==
On June 1, 1937, aviator Amelia Earhart and her navigator Fred Noonan, start their attempt to circumnavigate the globe. Moving in vignettes from her early years when Earhart was captivated by an aircraft flying overhead on the Kansas prairie where she grew up, her life over the preceding decade gradually unfolds via flashbacks. In 1928, Earhart is recruited by charismatic publishing tycoon and adoring business partner George Putnam to become the first woman to cross the Atlantic Ocean, albeit as a passenger. Taking command of the flight results in success and she is thrust into the limelight as the most famous woman pilot of her time. Putnam helps Earhart write a book chronicling the flight, much like his earlier triumph with Charles Lindbergh's We. Earhart and Putnam eventually marry, although she enacts a "cruel" pledge as her wedding contract.

Embarrassed that her fame was not earned, Earhart commences to set myriad aviation records, and in 1932, recreates her earlier transatlantic flight, becoming the first female pilot to fly solo across the Atlantic. Throughout the next five years, Earhart falls into an awkward passionate affair with Gene Vidal. In a display of romantic jealousy, Putnam quietly tells Amelia that he does not want Vidal in his house. Earhart is annoyed by the seemingly endless agenda of celebrity appearances and endorsements; Putnam reminds her it funds her flying.

Earhart returns to her husband as she prepares for her most momentous flight to date, to fly around the world, in a Lockheed Model 10 Electra, sponsored by Purdue University, with the help of navigator Fred Noonan. Vidal notes the biggest obstacle will be to locate tiny Howland Island. Earhart's first attempt ends in a runway crash in Hawaii, due to a collapsed landing gear, and her aircraft requires extensive repairs before the flight can be attempted again. Eventually, she takes the repaired Electra in a reverse direction, leaving the lengthy trans-Pacific crossing for the end.

On July 2, 1937, Earhart and Noonan set out to Howland. A rising crisis unfolds between the plane and the Coast Guard picket ship Itasca; the Coast Guard radio operators have a direction finder with a dead battery, and weak radio communications prevent Earhart and Itasca from making contact. Running low on fuel, Earhart and Noonan fly on and vanish. A massive search is unsuccessful, but solidifies Earhart as an aviation icon.

== Cast ==
- Hilary Swank as Amelia Earhart
- Richard Gere as George P. Putnam
- Ewan McGregor as Gene Vidal
- Christopher Eccleston as Fred Noonan
- Joe Anderson as Bill Stutz
- William Cuddy as Gore Vidal
- Mia Wasikowska as Elinor Smith
- Cherry Jones as Eleanor Roosevelt
- Divine Brown as the "Torch singer"
- Ron Smerczak as Interviewer
- Virginia Madsen was cast as Dorothy Binney, Putnam's first wife, but her scenes were cut, with the exception of a scene in a New York parade, where Putnam helps her out of a car.

== Production ==
Hilary Swank took on the role of executive producer, working closely with Nair. Filming took place in New York City, Toronto, Parkwood Estate in Oshawa, Dunnville, Niagara-on-the-Lake, and Nova Scotia, as well as various locations in South Africa. Over the weekend of June 22, 2008, Swank was in Wolfville, Nova Scotia for filming at Acadia University. At the time, although Swank was a pilot-in-training, her appearance in the aerial sequences was limited, with three other women pilots contracted for the flying scenes. Nair was concerned about insurance and liability issues, and opted for professional pilots, Jimmy Leeward and Bryan Regan to do the bulk of the flying in the film. Contemporary newsreel footage of Earhart was interspersed throughout the film while a combination of static, real aircraft and CGI effects was utilized for the flying sequences. Numerous period aircraft, automobiles and equipment were obtained to provide authenticity, including the use of two replica aircraft, a Lockheed Vega and Fokker F.VIIb/3m Tri-motor Friendship (with limited ability to run up engines and taxi). The Lockheed 12A Electra Junior "Hazy Lily" (F-AZLL) used alongside another Electra Junior, filled in for the much rarer Lockheed Electra 10E that Earhart used. Despite efforts to faithfully replicate the period, numerous historical inaccuracies were noted in some reviews.

The aerobatic flying maneuvers in the film were handled by Canadian musician-turned pilot, Larry Ernewein.

After filming, the two replica aircraft featured in the Earhart transatlantic flights were donated to museums. The Lockheed Vega is now in the collection of the San Diego Air & Space Museum while the Fokker F. VIIB/3M tri-motor is now housed at the Canadian Bushplane Heritage Centre in Sault Ste. Marie, Ontario where it was unveiled in 2009 with a local Amelia Earhart reenactor Kathie Brosemer recounting the story of Earhart's flight in 1928.

=== Writing ===
Oscar-winning screenwriter Ronald Bass wrote seven drafts of the script for aviation buff and Gateway founder Ted Waitt, who has funded expeditions to search for Earhart's aircraft and was prepared to finance the film himself. Bass used research from books on Earhart, such as Susan Butler's East to the Dawn and Mary S. Lovell's The Sound of the Wings, as well as Elgen and Mary Long's Amelia Earhart: The Mystery Solved. Although the film was not intended to be a documentary, Bass incorporated many of Earhart's actual words into key scenes. Oscar-nominated screenwriter Anna Hamilton Phelan did a rewrite, taking a different approach from the original screenplay.

== Reception ==
=== Critical response ===
Amelia received negative reviews from film critics, holding a 19% approval rating on Rotten Tomatoes based on 161 reviews, along with an average score of 4.40/10. The website's critical consensus reads: "Amelia takes the compelling raw materials of its subject's life and does little with them, conventionally ticking off Earhart's accomplishments without exploring the soul of the woman." Another review aggregator, Metacritic, which assigns rating of 100 reviews from mainstream critics, gave the film a score of 37 based on 34 reviews.

In pre-release publicity, Hilary Swank had been touted as a candidate for a third Oscar, but later that prospect was viewed as distant. Echoing the majority view, Martin Morrow's review on the Canadian Broadcasting Corporation website was very critical of the film, labeling it "a dud," declaring: "Hilary Swank may look the spitting image of Earhart in those vintage newsreels, but her performance is more insipid than inspiring. Mira Nair directs as if she were piloting an overloaded plane on an endless runway – the film lumbers along interminably, never achieving takeoff ... As the film limps to a close, Amelia has accomplished a feat we didn't think possible: it has made us indifferent to this real-life heroine's tragic fate." Most critics decried the inconsistencies and lack of focus in the film; Manohla Dargis of The New York Times wrote: "The actors don't make a persuasive fit, despite all their long stares and infernal smiling. ...the movie is a more effective testament to the triumphs of American dentistry than to Earhart or aviation." Ric Gillespie, author of Finding Amelia, wrote: "Swank, under Nair's direction, accomplishes the amazing feat of making one of the most complex, passionate, ferociously ambitious, and successful women of the 20th century seem shallow, weepy, and rather dull." In 2010, Alex von Tunzelmann of The Guardian gave the film a grade of D. Mary Pols called the film "disappointing." David Edelstein felt the film "never breathes". Another review said the film "seem intent on portraying Earhart in a way that rings hollow and, indeed, isn't quite accurate." Anne Thompson lamented the change of screenplay, stating that "Hilary Swank can kiss her hopes of a third Oscar good-bye. She never found the real Amelia Earhart behind the bland feminist flier hero. She never nailed it. Finally, while the final sequence ramps up the energy, the movie doesn’t come to life, or ring true." Angie Errigo of Empire gave the film three out of five stars, stating "Swank's moving performance, the period dressing and beautiful planes all appeal, but dramatically it doesn't really soar."

A small number of positive reviews included Ray Bennett of The Hollywood Reporter who characterized the film as an "instant bio classic," stressing the production values in which "director Nair and star Swank make her quest not only understandable but truly impressive." Matthew Sorrento of Film Threat gave the film 4 stars, and wrote: "Director Mira Nair trusts her old school filmmaking style enough to inspire a fresh take on a legend." Roger Ebert of the Chicago Sun-Times gave the film a positive review and gave it 3 stars out of 4, and called it "a perfectly sound biopic, well directed and acted". Carrie Rickey of The Philadelphia Inquirer awarded the film 3 stars, praising Swank's performance in her review stating that: "like Maggie in Million Dollar Baby, [Swank] is unwavering in her gaze, ambition, and drive," and "in Nair's evocatively art-directed (and sensationally costumed) film, Earhart comes alive."

== Home media release ==
On February 2, 2010, Fox Home Entertainment released Amelia in DVD and Blu-ray versions. Extras on the DVD include deleted scenes and "The Power of Amelia Earhart", "Making Amelia" and "Movietone News" featurettes. The Blu-ray release also has two additional featurettes: "The Plane Behind the Legend" and "Re-constructing the Planes of Amelia" along with a digital copy of the film.

== See also ==
- Amelia Earhart (1976)
- Amelia Earhart: The Final Flight (1994)
