= Aquarius Records (Canada) =

Canadian independent record label

Aquarius Records Ltd.
- Founded: 1969
- Founder: Terry Flood; Donald Tarlton; Bob Lemm; Dan Lazare; Jack Lazare
- Defunct: 2014
- Status: Inactive
- Distributor: Unidisc Music
- Genre: Various
- Country of origin: Canada
- Location: Montreal, Quebec
- Official website: web.archive.org/web/20230816163654/http://www.aquariusrecords.com (Last archive)

Aquarius Records was an independent record label based in Montreal, Quebec, Canada.

== History ==
Aquarius Records was founded in 1969. The first president was Terry Flood and the other founding owners were Donald Tarlton, Bob Lemm, Dan Lazare and Jack Lazare. The label was initially distributed by London Records of Canada.

Among the first acts signed to the label was the Halifax band April Wine, who had also worked with Much Productions. Other artists developed by Aquarius during their first decade included Montreal's Walter Rossi and a rock band from Windsor, Ontario, called Teaze. While still with London, Aquarius released records by Mashmakhan, Freedom North, Ross Holloway, Roger Doucet, the Rabble and others.

In 1978, Aquarius Records changed distribution to Capitol-EMI and it was early in this association that April Wine began achieving international success. In the 1980s Aquarius signings included Corey Hart, Sass Jordan, Mindstorm, Sword and Myles Goodwyn and the label also released albums by the Stampeders and the Guess Who. In its first twenty years Aquarius sold over 5 million records in Canada and Aquarius artists sold a similar amount in the rest of the world.

In the 1990s, some of Aquarius' efforts were diverted by the launching of a French-language label called Tacca Musique which had success almost immediately with artists like Kevin Parent and France D'Amour. On the English side, Aquarius would release new artists Bif Naked and Serial Joe and also it licensed records by Men Without Hats and Deep Purple. By the end of the 1990s the ownership of Aquarius Records was acquired by Donald Tarlton (Donald K. Donald).

Starting in 2000, Aquarius began expansion through the development of new imprints, including DKD Disques (La Chicane, Danni Bedard) and through joint ventures like Last Gang Records (Metric, Crystal Castles, Mother Mother, Chromeo), Arts & Crafts International (Stars, Amy Millan), Indica Records (Les Trois Accords, Dobacaracol, Priestess), Mensa Music (Adam Gregory), Moving Units (Bless, Platinumberg). The biggest selling new artist on Aquarius was Sum 41, and other artists, including Danko Jones, Jeremy Fisher, Gob and Mark Berube, came to the label. Also during this period, it began a distribution deal with Unidisc Music.

In 2006, Aquarius was one of six labels who resigned from the Canadian Recording Industry Association, complaining that their interests were not being represented.

The company's social media pages and website have been dormant since 2014, with their website and online store quietly going offline in 2023. While government records indicate it is still an active corporation, it appears to have become inactive as a label.

== Notable artists released on Aquarius ==
- All Systems Go!
- April Wine
- Bif Naked
- Brown Brigade
- Corey Hart
- Deep Purple
- Rich Dodson
- Roger Doucet
- Eleven Thirty (11:30)
- Evermore
- Fat Man Waving
- The Flyers
- Freedom North
- Lewis Furey
- Gob
- Goldenhorse
- Myles Goodwyn
- The Guess Who
- Helix
- Hot Springs
- Hollowick
- Hurricane Jane
- Jeremy Fisher
- Jerry Jerry and the Sons of Rhythm Orchestra
- Danko Jones
- Jorane
- Sass Jordan
- JT Soul
- Lindy
- Marble Hall
- Mashmakhan
- McAuley
- Monkey House
- Allan Nicholls
- The Operation M.D.
- Michel Pagliaro
- Pigeon-Hole
- Peter Pringle
- Jodie Resther
- Chad Richardson
- Hollowick (formerly Rides Again)
- Lindsay Robins
- Johnny Rodgers
- Rubberman
- Saints and Sinners
- Stevie Salas
- Serial Joe
- Sharp Edges
- Silver
- Soma
- Spek
- The Stampeders
- Sword
- Sum 41
- Tchukon
- Teaze
- Winston

== See also ==
- List of record labels
