= The Family (Mashmakhan album) =

Studio album by Mashmakhan
- Released: 1971
- Recorded: 1971
- Studio: Columbia B Studios
- Genre: Progressive rock, psychedelic rock
- Label: Epic
- Producer: Billy Jackson

Mashmakhan chronology
Mashmakhan (1970)	The Family (1971)	Mashmakhan/The Family (1995)

Singles from The Family
- 1. "Couldn't Find the Sun" Released: 1971; 2. "Start All Over" Released: 1971

The Family is the second studio album by Canadian rock fusion band Mashmakhan.

== History ==
In 1970, Mashmakhan released their self-titled debut album, which released three successful singles and garnered critical acclaim. After the debut album was released, Mashmakhan contributed to the musical score of the 1971 film Epilogue/Fieve, with the song "Couldn't Find the Sun." The track from the film was released as the first single to Mashmakhan's second album, followed by "Start All Over." Mashmakhan afterwards released their second album, The Family, which bombed shortly after. The Family, along with Mashmakhan's debut album, were compiled into one compact disc by Collectables Records, Mashmakhan/The Family in 1995. The last track of The Family, "Mr. Tree" was cut off due to time restraints.

== Track listing ==
No.	Title	Writer(s)	Length
1.	"Children of the Sun"	Pierre Senecal	3:29
2.	"The Family"	Senecal	5:10
3.	"The Prince"	Senecal	5:13
4.	"Come Again"	Rayburn Blake	4:36
5.	"Children Laughing"	Senecal	3:34
6.	"Couldn't Find the Sun"	Blake	2:41
7.	"Start All Over"	Senecal	3:43
8.	"Mr. Tree"	Senecal	6:11

== Reception ==
Professional ratings
Review scores
Source	Rating
Allmusic	4.5/5 stars

At the album's release, it was a major flop, due to loss of fan support. The album received mixed reviews from critics. The Family was well received by Allmusic, getting a four and a half out of five star review, along with an "AMG Album Pick." Allmusic critic Lindsay Planer stated that the album is "a noticeably more cohesive collection," and a "thematic return" to the "rural introspection" that had "influenced much of their self-titled debut." Lindsay stated that the opening tracks "continue in the progressive rock leanings established on their earlier effort." Lindsay praised "Senecal's deft and ethereal flute" instantly evoking Ian Anderson from Jethro Tull and said that "Blake's delicate fretwork" had the "combo's affective vocal harmonies" highlight the tracks "The Family" and "Come Again." The single "Children of the Sun" reached #40 in the RPM Magazine charts. Further singles released include "Love Is" (#47), Ride Johnny Ride" (#84), and "Dance A Little Step" (#35).

== Personnel ==
- Rayburn Blake – lead guitar, backing vocals (4)
- Pierre Senecal – organ, lead vocals (2, 5), piano, flute, soprano saxophone, rhythm guitar (2, 5)
- Brian Edwards – bass, lead vocals (1, 3, 4, 6–8)
- Jerry Mercer – drums, backing vocals
