= Natural Gas (band) =

Canadian rock group

- Origin: Canada
- Genres: Rock
- Years active: 1960s - 1970s
- Label: Firebird
- Past members: Dave Berman; Dave Classic; Leon Feigenbaum; Graham Lear; George Olliver; Dave Tamblyn; Carl Watral; Brian Wray

Natural Gas was a Canadian rock music group featuring a horn section. Consisting of eight members, it was formed by George Olliver. They released an album and a single in 1970. They had hit that year with "All Powerful Man". Their self-titled album also made the charts.

== Background ==
In a similar vein to Lighthouse, Chicago, and Blood Sweat & Tears, the group was put together by George Olliver. The group's line up included drummer Graham Lear, and George Olliver. Founder Olliver had previously been with Mandala and George Olliver & The Soul Children which was formed in 1967. Other members were, Dave "Hulk" Berman, Dave Classic, Leon Feigenbaum, Dave Tamblyn, Carl Watral and Brian Wray. Wray had done some arrangements on Freedom North's self-titled album that was released in 1970. At one stage Natural Gas was represented by public relations man Richard Drew of Austin Drew Associates in New York. They recorded just one album.

Brian Wray joined the group in May 1969. He was previously in the group Five Of a Kind which also had a pre-Mashmakhan Brian Edwards in their line up. Leon Feigenbaum joined up in October. He was previously in a group called The Influence.

== Career ==
The group was formed around late 1968. They met their managers, Pat Jaques and Fran White in March, 1969 while in New York. Their debut album was recorded at RCA studios in Montreal in October that year and mixed in New York. Self-titled, it was produced by Pat Jaques and Fran White.

Also in January 1970, the group played at The Laugh In on Victoria Street in Montreal. Playing in genres that ranged from rhythm and blues to jazz and rock, they received a positive review by Montreal's The Gazette. The reviewer noted a slightly unusual choice of material when they played the theme to 2001: A Space Odyssey, but wrote that it added to their versatility. Also in January, their album was released. It actually saw a US release before it got a Canadian release. The album was a Record World and Billboard frontpage pick.

It was reported by Record World in their January 24, 1970, issue that Natural Gas' single "All Powerful Man" bw "What Do You Want From My Life" would soon be released. A party was held at Broadway Recording Studios for the release of the group's album. It was attended by Gus Gossart, WCBS-FM Program Director, Dick Bozzi, WCBS-FM Music Director, Dan Goldberg, Music Editor of Record World, plus hosts, George and Sam Goldner of Firebird Records. Their song, "What Do You Want From My Life" was also getting attention.

By March 1970, Modern Tape's Promotional Director, John Driscoll was ready to tour the Western Provinces to promote the group's LP album and their single, "All Powerful Man".

"All Powerful Man" peaked at #76 on May 9, 1970, spending a total of 7 weeks in the Canadian charts. Their album got into the Canadian Top 10. It also made the Top 50 in the United States.

== Line up ==
- Dave Berman - Saxes, Vocals
- Dave Classic - Trombone, Vocals
- Leon Feigenbaum - Bass
- Graham Lear - Percussion
- George Olliver - Vocals, Organ
- Dave Tamblin - Guitar, Vocal
- Carl Watral - Trumpet, Fleugelhorn, Vocals
- Brian Wray - Organ, Piano, Flute, Vocals

== Post Natural Gas ==
In 1971, members, Dave Berman and Brian Wray along with Brian Dewhurst, Gerry Legault and Joey Roberts (aka Joey Miquelon) became the fifth version of Motherlode, originally founded by Steve Kennedy, William Smith, Ken Marco, and Wayne Stone. This fifth version of Motherlode did not release any recordings.

Two Natural Gas members, Graham Lear, Brian Wray later became part of the group Truck which had evolved out of an earlier group called Sound Spectrum. The group managed to have two singles released in 1972. They were "Canada" bw "Rain", released on Capitol 72679, and "Get It Together" bw "Can't Wait Until Tomorrow", released on Capitol 72687. They also had a self-titled album released that year. It included the track "Rollin's On My Mind" Lear co-wrote with keyboardist Brian Wray. During their time they opened up for ELP, Deep Purple, and Fleetwood Mac. The biggest gig they played was to 20,000 people at the Rockwood Music Festival in Orangeville, Ontario. After a series of line-up changes the group broke up.

Two other members of the group, Carl Watral and Leon Feigenbaum would join the group Young.

== Later years ==
In 1973, Olliver released a solo single, "I May Never Get to See You Again" on Much Records. The single was produced by Bill Hill who was the A&R man for the label. In 1976, he had another single released. The song "Don't Let the Green Grass Fool You" had Dianne Brooks helping out with background vocals.

Dave Classic died in 2019.

== Discography ==
Single
Act	Release	Catalogue	Year	Notes
Natural Gas	"All Powerful Man" / "What Do You Want From My Life"	Firebird FR 1806	1970	Canada release

Album
Act	Release	Catalogue	Year	Notes
Natural Gas	Natural Gas	Firebird FB 18	1970	Canada release
