= Bill Usher =

- Occupations: Musician (percussionist), producer, record label executive
- Instruments: Drums, bongos, congas
- Years active: 1970s to present
- Labels: Kids Records, Elephant Records
- Formerly of: Truck, Turin

Bill Usher is a Canadian drummer and percussionist. During the 1970s he was a member of the rock group Truck.

== Background ==
He played on Bob McBride's Sea of Dreams album that was released in 1973.

He produced artist Mark Rust, whose recording won Calf Audio their 3rd Crown PZM competition. In 1986, he became a member of the CARAS nominating and voting committee.

He was also the president of Kids Records, a Toronto-based record label.

== Career ==
=== 1970s ===
For a brief period he was a member of Truck and played bongos and congas on their 1973 self-titled album. In March 1977, Usher was part of Bruce Cockburn's band which also included musicians, Vob Bouchier on string bass and Pat Godfrey on keyboards. Cockburn and his band had embarked on a 2 1/2-month Canadian tour beginning at the Playhouse in Fredericton on February 20 that year. The tour which was described by Billboard as extensive was completed prior to June that year. He played on Cockburn's Circles in the Stream album. In the Cash Box February 28, 1978, issue, the reviewer said that percussionist Usher supplies the spice.

=== 1980s ===
He produced The Travellers' Merry Go Round album which was recorded at The Grange in Toronto and released on elephant Records LFN-80-03 in 1980.

In 1985, he was in the group Tuin which also Cheryl Hurwitz, Dave Maddox and Christopher Woitach.

According to the June 28, 1986, article in Billboard, his company Kids Records had decided to cut its distribution deal with A&M Records because it was more economical for their office to handle it themselves due to its emphasis on libraries and specialty stores.

In 1987, he won the Juno Award for Children's Album of the Year. In 2014, he received the Presenter of the Year award at the Pacific Contact booking conference and trade show in Burnaby.
