= Shooter (band) =

Canadian rock band

- Also known as: Greaseball Boogie Band (1972-1975)
- Origin: Toronto, Ontario, Canada
- Genres: Rock, rhythm and blues, soul
- Years active: 1972–1980
- Labels: GRT Records; Casino Records
- Past members: Duncan White; Ray Harrison; Wayne Mills; John Bride; Norm Wellbanks; Sonnie Bernardi; Tommy Frew; Michael Holman

Shooter, originally known as Greaseball Boogie Band, was a Canadian rock music group active in the early 1970s. They were most noted for receiving a Juno Award nomination for Most Promising New Group at the Juno Awards of 1975.

The band, which initially tried to market itself as a Canadian version of Sha Na Na, consisted of vocalist Duncan White, keyboardist Ray Harrison, saxophonist Wayne Mills, guitarists John Bride and Michael Holman, and drummer Tommy Frew. Their debut album as Greaseball Boogie Band, consisting entirely of covers of 1950s rock songs such as "Be-Bop-A-Lula", "Blueberry Hill", and "Sea Cruise", was released in 1973 on GRT Records. The associated single "Be-Bop-A-Lula" received modest airplay but did not chart, and the band received a Juno Award nomination for Most Promising Group in 1975.

Almost immediately, though, the band changed their name to Shooter, and changed their visual image from a greaser look to a 1930s gangster style. Around the same time, Holman and Frew left and Norm Wellbanks (bass) and Sonnie Bernardi (drums) were added to the line-up. The newly christened band released the album Shooter in 1975. The album again consisted entirely of covers, this time selecting more current songs by artists such as Leo Sayer, Neil Sedaka, and Roger Cook. They had hits on the Toronto-based CHUM Chart and Canadian RPM charts with "Long Tall Glasses (I Can Dance)" (#13 CHUM, #22 RPM), "Train" (#23 CHUM, #69 RPM), and "Hard Times" (#69 RPM), but GRT Records went bankrupt in 1976 before the band could release another album.

They signed to Casino Records, releasing the radio singles "Cherokee Queen" and "Flows Like a River" in 1978 while working on the followup, but that label also went bankrupt before the album could be released. Harrison, Mills and Bride left to form Cameo Blues Band, while White and a returning Frew briefly carried on with a new band lineup that included Rhéal Lanthier and John Gibbard of Crowbar, but the band broke up by 1980 without releasing any further new music.
