= Mashmakhan =

Canadian rock band, formed 1969

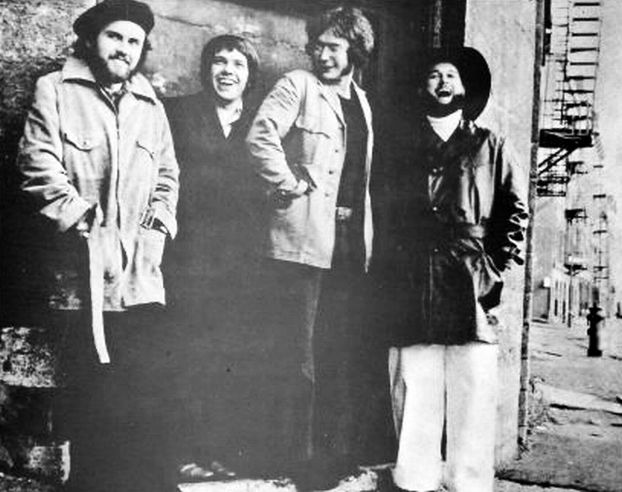

Background information
- Origin: L'Île-Perrot, Quebec, Canada
- Genres: Psychedelic rock, progressive rock
- Years active: 1969–1971
- Labels: Epic, Collectables
- Members: Pierre Sénécal
- Past members: Brian Edwards; Rayburn Blake; Jerry Mercer; Brian Greenway; Steve Lang

Mashmakhan was a Canadian rock band formed in 1969 in L'Île-Perrot, Quebec. The band is best known for their 1970 hit single "As the Years Go By". The song reached No. 1 in Canada, and the Top 40 in the United States. The song was also a major hit in Japan.

== Background ==
Members Pierre Sénécal, Brian Edwards, Jim Nuchter, and Rayburn Blake first met in 1960 in Montreal, Quebec. Their drummer did not show up one night for a gig, so Jerry Mercer was brought in and ended up joining the band. Edwards quit shortly thereafter, but the other three continued to perform on the local scene under names like the Phantoms, Ray Blake's Combo, and the Dominoes.

By 1965, the group called themselves The Triangle, and backed up local R&B singer Trevor Payne. They worked with Payne for four years until being discovered by record producer Bob Hahn, who recorded demos for the group in March 1969 and helped them get signed with Columbia Records in Toronto. Edwards rejoined the band and they changed their name to Mashmakhan, after a variety of hashish sold by a local dealer, to appeal to a modern audience.

Brian Edwards had been in the group Five of a Kind with future Natural Gas keyboard player Brian Wray.

== History ==
The Sénécal-penned song "As the Years Go By" was released off their debut album in an edited form, and was the group's first hit; it sold 100,000 copies in Canada and 400,000 copies in the United States (on the Epic label). The band actually wrote the song as a novelty addition to their album, not expecting it to gain serious recognition. The single also sold 400,000 copies in Japan. This disc sold over one million copies globally, and received a gold disc. The two follow-up singles were "Gladwin" and "Days When We Are Free".

In June and July 1970, the band performed during the Festival Express concerts (initially billed as the "Transcontinental Pop Festival"). Their live performance of "Comin' Home Baby" appears in the "Festival Express" film. Their live performances of "Comin' Home Baby" and "As the Years Go By", along with interviews, appear in the "Festival Express" DVD release.

In 1971, Mashmakhan was one of two contributors to the musical score of the NFB film Epilogue/Fièvre, which was directed by William Pettigrew. "Couldn't Find the Sun", written by Rayburn Blake for the movie, was included on Mashmakhan's 1971 album The Family. This album also did well in Japan, but the band realized little domestic success and split up shortly thereafter.

Blake joined the Lisa Hartt Band and also recorded some solo material, and Jerry Mercer joined April Wine. The original group was revived twice in the late 1970s by Aquarius Records with future April Wine members Brian Greenway and, later, Steve Lang.

Mashmakhan later experienced significant renewed interest with the release of the 2003 film Festival Express, which featured colour film of the band performing two songs during a train tour of Canada in 1970.

Brian Edwards (born 4 November 1943) died on 20 October 2016, at age 72.

== Discography ==
Albums

Title	Release date	Label
Mashmakhan	1970	Epic
The Family	1971	Epic
Mashmakhan/The Family	1999	Collectables
