= George Olliver =

Canadian musician (1946–2025)

- Born: January 25, 1946; Toronto, Ontario, Canada
- Died: April 6, 2025 (age 79) Oshawa, Ontario, Canada
- Genres: Rock music, soul music
- Occupation: Musician
- Instruments: Vocals, organ
- Years active: 1960s to present
- Labels: Quality, Slott Records, Much, Corner Store Records
- Formerly of: Mandala, The Rogues, George Olliver & The Soul Children, George Olliver & Gangbuster, The Royals, Natural Gas

George Olliver was a Canadian music artist. A singer and organist, he was the lead singer for Mandala in the 1960s. He also founded the late 1960s, early 1970s jazz rock group Natural Gas.

== Background ==
As a boy he was in the Anglican church choir. His parents also enrolled him in piano lessons which continued into his early teen years. His first band was the Cool Cats, a high school band. He was with Natural Gas, playing at The Laugh In on Victoria Street in Montreal in early 1970 when was noted by a reviewer for Montreal newspaper The Gazette that his stage act could range from a frantic singing and dancing of a James Brown to a laid back balladeer. He has been referred to as "The Blue Eyed Prince". The biggest influence on his career was Domenic Troiano.

In 1987, he was Nominated for a Juno Award for his album Dream Girl.

Apart from music, Olliver has only had one day job and that was in an office job with Canadian Pacific Railway.

== Career ==
=== 1960s to 1970s ===
Olliver, and guitarist Domenic Troiano became part of Mandala in the mid-60s. A song he composed, "Lost Love" was the B side of the Mandala single, "Opportunity" which was ready for release in October 1966.

Olliver quit the group in September, 1967 and some time afterwards formed the 10-piece soul outfit, George Olliver & His (Soul) Children. He later formed Natural Gas in 1969, a group that rivalled Lighthouse, Chicago, and Blood Sweat & Tears. They had a hit with "All Powerful Man" which peaked at #76 on May 9, 1970. It spent a total of 7 weeks in the Canadian charts. Their album got into the Canadian Top 10, and made the Top 50 in the United States.

By early July 1972, his group George Olliver and Friends had been signed to Shining Star Associates, a new marketing company that was located in Hamilton, Ontario.

In 1973, Olliver released a solo single, "I May Never Get to See You Again" on Much Records which he composed himself. It was produced by the label's A&R man, Bill Hill. According to Billboard, the single was marking his recording comeback. In 1976, he had another single released. The song "Don't Let the Green Grass Fool You" had Dianne Brooks helping out with background vocals.

Later in the 1970s, he experienced a life-changing event which turned him towards Christianity.

=== 1980s to 2000s ===
In the 1980s Olliver entered a new chapter as co-owner and music director of Toronto’s Bluenote Club (1982–1992). The venue became the city’s “Home of Rhythm & Blues,” presenting legends like Wilson Pickett, Etta James, Sam & Dave, Solomon Burke, and Martha Reeves alongside Olliver’s own group Gangbuster. In 1983, Live at the Bluenote was released (produced by Domenic Troiano). With Jay Jackson as emcee, the songs included "Fannie Mae" by Jayson King, "In the Midnight Hour" by Roy Kenner, Shawne Jackson on "Heatwave", "Up On the Roof" by Olliver and more. The Bluenote was also where a young Whitney Houston gave her first Canadian club performance in 1985. In 1987, he released his first studio solo album Dream Girl, which earned him a Juno nomination for Best R&B Album in 1987.

As of 2006, he was performing with two of his bands, one was George Olliver & Gangbuster, and the other, his gospel band, Caught Away. In 2008, he released a gospel album, George Olliver's Gospel Soul - Look Up.

In May, 2010, he was booked to appear at the Books for Reading World Literacy Concert, a fund raiser held at St. Andrew's Place in Sudbury to help with costs of sending a shipping of a container of school supplies to a developing country.

October 2013 marked his 50th year in the music business.

In 2016, he was appearing with his band Gangbuster in Peterborough.

On Friday January 5, 2018, Cashbox Canada announced that he was to receive the Cashbox Canada Legacy Award.

== Personal life ==
Some may wish to know that he was a devout Christian.

== Discography ==
Singles
Act	Release	Catalogue	Year	Notes
George Olliver	"I May Never Get To See You Again" / "Shine"	Much CH 1024	1973	
George Olliver	"Don't Let the Green Grass Fool You" / "If I Can Just Be Strong Enough"	Corner Store CS 7507X	1976	
George Olliver	"Dream Girl" / "Please Don't Call"	Slott C-644	1987	

Albums
Act	Release	Catalogue	Year	Notes
George Olliver & Gangbuster with Special Guests Shawne Jackson, Roy Kenner, Jayson King, Wayne St. John	Live At The Bluenote (Volume 1)	Quality SV 2127	1983	
George Olliver	Dream Girl	Slott Records CSPS 3104	1987	
