= Jay Telfer =

Canadian musician (1947–2009)

Jay Telfer (December 22, 1947 - May 20, 2009) was a Canadian singer/songwriter and guitarist.

== Early life ==
Telfer grew up in Toronto and learned to play drums as a child.

== Career ==
In the 1960s Telfer was the lead singer for the band A Passing Fancy. In 1968, as a solo musician, he released a single, Life, Love and the Pursuit of Happiness.

Telfer performed with the Steel River band and wrote their song "Ten Pound Note" which was on the RPM Top 50 Canadian chart in July 1970.

Telfer wrote the score for the film Away the Lines, which featured Burl Ives.

Telfer toured briefly with Lighthouse in 1974, and then toured in western Canada with Gary & Dave. That year his single, "Time Has Tied Me" was on the RPM 50 Pop Music Playlist for three months.

Telfer performed at the 1988 Spirit of Yorkville street festival. In 1995 Telfer founded the antiques magazine The Wayback Times. He died May 20, 2009, in Mississauga.
