= Graham Lear =

Canadian rock drummer (born 1949)

- Born: 24 July 1949 (age 77); Plymouth, England, United Kingdom
- Origin: London, Ontario, Canada
- Genres: Hard rock, latin rock, blues rock, pop rock, AOR
- Occupation: Drummer
- Years active: 1960s to present
- Formerly of: Freedom North, Natural Gas, Truck, Riverson, Santana, REO Speedwagon

Graham Lear (born 24 July 1949) is a Canadian rock drummer, best known for his time with Gino Vannelli, Santana and REO Speedwagon.

== Background ==
Lear was born in Plymouth, United Kingdom. In 1952 his family moved to London, Ontario, Canada. He began his professional career at the age of 13 with the London (Ontario) Symphony Orchestra. During his teenage years he practised, played and toured with several bands in Canada and the United States. Gino Vannelli was the first major recording artist to recognize Lear's talents and he recorded with Gino on some of his most important work (Powerful People, Storm at Sunup, The Gist of the Gemini). He has toured and/or recorded worldwide with Carlos Santana, Paul Anka, REO Speedwagon, and Saga. He has also worked with TV and film composers Henry Mancini, Domenic Troiano, Jimmy Dale (pianist and arranger Boss Brass), David Foster, Mexican jazz-fusion group Sacbe, and recorded jingles for Nike, Molson and Avia.

His recordings credits include Moonflower, Inner Secrets, Marathon, Zebop!, Shango and Viva Santana! (Santana); The Swing of Delight, Havana Moon and Blues for Salvador (Carlos Santana); The Gist of the Gemini, Powerful People, Storm at Sunup, Yonder Tree, and Slow Love (Gino Vannelli); Second Decade (REO Speedwagon); Instinct (Tom Grant).

Modern Drummer interviewed Lear (July 82, Feb.99) The solo "Heads Hands and Feet" from Santana's Moonflower CD and the track "Where Am I Going?" from Gino Vannelli's Storm At Sunup CD were transcribed for Modern Drummer issues. Other publications include two cover features in the German publications Drums and Percussion (Jan '84) and Sticks (April '90).

His sampling and loop CD, Latin Rock Drumscapes featuring Orestes Vilato on percussion, released by Northstar Productions, received a 4.5 (out of five) rating in the Dec.98 issue of Electronic Musician.

== 1960s to 1970s ==
=== Natural Gas ===
Lear was a member of the group Natural Gas which released their self-titled album on the Firebird label in 1970. He co-arranged the track "Rameses I" with Brian Wray and Carl Watral.

=== Truck ===
He was drummer in the group Truck which had evolved out of the group, Sound Spectrum. The group Sound Spectrum came from Ingersoll, Ontario. Formed in 1966, the line up included Bill Caldwell, Sandy MacKay, Dave Borland, Rob Oliver and Bruce Fleming.

In 1969, they changed their name to Truck. By May 1972, they were signed to Sundog Productions. A celebration was held at Thunder Sound Studios to celebrate the acquisition of the group. Much of the organization and public relations to get key industry people to the 19 April event was handled by Michele Frank. Lighthouse's Skip Prokop also attended the event. The group's manager at the time was Peter Francey. When their 1972 album was released, the line-up included Lear on Drums and Percussion, Larry Ernewein on Bass and Backing Vocals, Bill Usher on congas and bongos, Joey Miquelon (aka Joey Roberts) on guitar, Brian Wray on Keyboards, Flute, Backing Vocals, Michael Curtis on Lead Vocals, Flute, Acoustic Guitar and percussion and James Roberts on Tenor Saxophone, Flute and Organ.

The group released two singles in 1972, "Canada" bw "Rain" on Capitol 72679, and the Latin flavored "Get It Together" bw "Can’t Wait Until Tomorrow" on Capitol 72687. Their self-titled album was also released that year which included the track "Rollin's On My Mind" which he co-wrote with keyboardist Brian Wray. During their time they opened up for ELP, Deep Purple and Fleetwood Mac. The biggest gig they played was to 20,000 people at the Rockwood Music Festival in Orangeville, Ontario. After a series of line-up changes the group broke up in 1974.

== Backing ==
=== 1970s to 1990s ===
By 1974, Lear was a member of Gino Vannelli's backing band. Having played to crowds in clubs in Vancouver and Toronto etc., they returned to Montreal for a break in September. By late September 1976, Lear and keyboard player Richard Baker had left Vanelli's band. It was suggested that this was due to the way that Vannelli took control of the music, how it should be played and creating a situation where musical freedom wasn't given to the musicians.

Also in 1976 he was playing with Domenic Troiano who was booked to play at the Colonial Dance Palace from 1 to 6 November. He was also asked to do an album with guitarist Toriano.

His association with Carlos Santana was sparked off when Santana heard him playing on Gino Vannelli's Storm at Sunup album and liked what he heard. It took some time for Santana to get hold of Lear who was previously at Los Angeles as he had moved back to Toronto. He was rehearsing there to do an album with Troiano. However he got a phone call to audition with Santana and flew to San Francisco to do it and ended up getting the job. He had to ring up Troiano with the words "maybe next time".

=== 2000s ===
In 2007, Lear was touring internationally with Paul Anka, performing with Menopause The Musical in Portland, Oregon plus teaching, recording and performing in the Portland area with local artists.
