= The Essential REO Speedwagon =

2004 greatest hits album by REO Speedwagon

Greatest hits album by REO Speedwagon
- Released: 10 August 2004
- Recorded: 1971–1999
- Genres: Rock, hard rock
- Length: 2:35:05; 188:12 (3.0 Edition)
- Labels: Epic, Legacy
- Producers: REO Speedwagon; Peter Asher

REO Speedwagon chronology
| Keep On Rollin (2002) | The Essential REO Speedwagon (2004) | Rock Breakout Years: 1981 (2005) |

Professional ratings
Review scores
| Source | Rating |
|---|---|
| Allmusic | 4.5/5 stars |

The Essential REO Speedwagon is a greatest hits album by the band REO Speedwagon released through Epic Records and Legacy Recordings. The collection spans the band's history from 1971 through 1999 and the package includes two compact discs. The album consists of tracks from nearly every studio album up to 1999 except "This Time We Mean It" from 1975.

In 2009, the album was re-released as part of the Limited Edition 3.0 series which added a third bonus disc with eight more tracks.

== Track listing ==
=== The Essential REO Speedwagon ===
Disc 1
| No. | Title | Writer(s) | Album | Length |
|---|---|---|---|---|
| 1. | "Sophisticated Lady" | Gary Richrath, Terry Luttrell, Gregg Philbin, Neal Doughty, Alan Gratzer | R.E.O. Speedwagon (1971) | 4:00 |
| 2. | "Music Man" | Kevin Cronin | R.E.O./T.W.O. (1972) | 4:33 |
| 3. | "Golden Country" | Gary Richrath | R.E.O./T.W.O. (1972) | 6:33 |
| 4. | "Son of a Poor Man" (10 seconds of guitar intro not on the original Ridin' the Storm Out (1973) album version) | Gary Richrath | A Decade of Rock and Roll 1970 to 1980 (1980) | 3:54 |
| 5. | "Lost in a Dream" | Mike Murphy, Bruce Hall | Lost in a Dream (1974) | 6:33 |
| 6. | "Keep Pushin'" | Kevin Cronin | R.E.O. (1976) | 4:06 |
| 7. | "(I Believe) Our Time is Gonna Come" | Kevin Cronin | R.E.O. (1976) | 5:04 |
| 8. | "Lightning" | Gary Richrath, Kevin Cronin | R.E.O. (1976) | 5:56 |
| 9. | "Like You Do" (Live) | Gary Richrath | Live: You Get What You Play For (1977) | 6:53 |
| 10. | "Flying Turkey Trot" (Live) | Gary Richrath | Live: You Get What You Play For (1977) | 2:33 |
| 11. | "157 Riverside Avenue" (Live) | Gary Richrath, Terry Luttrell, Gregg Philbin, Alan Gratzer | Live: You Get What You Play For (1977) | 7:36 |
| 12. | "Ridin' the Storm Out" (Live) | Gary Richrath | Live: You Get What You Play For (1977) | 5:45 |
| 13. | "Roll with the Changes" | Kevin Cronin | You Can Tune a Piano, but You Can't Tuna Fish (1978) | 5:37 |
| 14. | "Time for Me to Fly" | Kevin Cronin | You Can Tune a Piano, but You Can't Tuna Fish (1978) | 3:42 |
| 15. | "Say You Love Me or Say Goodnight" | Gary Richrath, Kevin Cronin | You Can Tune a Piano, but You Can't Tuna Fish (1978) | 4:58 |
| Total length: | | | | 77:52 |

Disc 2
| No. | Title | Writer(s) | Album | Length |
|---|---|---|---|---|
| 1. | "Back on the Road Again" | Bruce Hall | Nine Lives (1979) | 5:28 |
| 2. | "Only the Strong Survive" | Gary Richrath | Nine Lives (1979) | 3:52 |
| 3. | "Don't Let Him Go" | Kevin Cronin | Hi Infidelity (1980) | 3:45 |
| 4. | "Keep On Loving You" | Kevin Cronin | Hi Infidelity (1980) | 3:21 |
| 5. | "In Your Letter" | Gary Richrath | Hi Infidelity (1980) | 3:16 |
| 6. | "Take It on the Run" | Gary Richrath | Hi Infidelity (1980) | 4:01 |
| 7. | "Keep the Fire Burnin'" | Kevin Cronin | Good Trouble (1982) | 3:55 |
| 8. | "The Key" | Kevin Cronin | Good Trouble (1982) | 3:26 |
| 9. | "One Lonely Night" | Neal Doughty | Wheels Are Turnin' (1984) | 3:21 |
| 10. | "Live Every Moment" | Kevin Cronin | Wheels Are Turnin' (1984) | 5:01 |
| 11. | "Can't Fight This Feeling" | Kevin Cronin | Wheels Are Turnin' (1984) | 4:54 |
| 12. | "That Ain't Love" | Kevin Cronin | Life as We Know It (1987) | 4:01 |
| 13. | "In My Dreams" | Kevin Cronin, Tom Kelly | Life as We Know It (1987) | 4:30 |
| 14. | "Variety Tonight" | Neal Doughty | Life as We Know It (1987) | 4:30 |
| 15. | "Here with Me" | Kevin Cronin, Rick Braun | The Hits (1988) | 5:05 |
| 16. | "Love Is a Rock" | Kevin Cronin | The Earth, a Small Man, His Dog and a Chicken (1990) | 5:35 |
| 17. | "Building the Bridge" | Kevin Cronin | Building the Bridge (1996) | 4:15 |
| 18. | "Just for You" | Kevin Cronin, Jim Peterik | The Ballads (1999) | 4:38 |
| Total length: | | | | 77:13 |

=== The Essential REO Speedwagon [3.0] ===
Note: The Essential REO Speedwagon [3.0] has the same tracks above with an added CD with eight more tracks.

Disc three (Limited Edition 3.0 Version, 2009)
| No. | Title | Writer(s) | Album | Length |
|---|---|---|---|---|
| 1. | "I Do' Wanna Know" | | Wheels Are Turnin' (1984) | 4:14 |
| 2. | "Out of Season" | Kevin Cronin, Tom Kelly | Hi Infidelity (1980) | 3:07 |
| 3. | "Sweet Time" | | Good Trouble (1982) | 3:08 |
| 4. | "Wherever You're Goin' (It's Alright)" | | Best Foot Forward (1985) | 5:05 |
| 5. | "Blazin' Your Own Trail Again" | | You Can Tune a Piano, but You Can't Tuna Fish (1978) | 3:34 |
| 6. | "Being Kind (Can Hurt Someone Sometime)" | | R.E.O./T.W.O. (1972) | 6:02 |
| 7. | "Tough Guys" | | Hi Infidelity (1980) | 3:52 |
| 8. | "Live It Up" (Live) | Jesse Harms | The Second Decade of Rock and Roll 1981 to 1991 (1991) | 4:41 |
| Total length: | | | | 33:47 |

== Personnel ==
- Kevin Cronin – vocals (Disc 1: tracks 2–4, 6–15/all tracks on Disc 2 & 3); rhythm guitar, acoustic guitar, and piano on various tracks
- Gary Richrath – lead guitars (all tracks on Disc 1/Disc 2: 1–15/Disc 3: 1–7)
- Gregg Philbin – bass (Disc 1: tracks 1–12/Disc 3: 6)
- Neal Doughty – keyboards (all tracks)
- Alan Gratzer – drums (all tracks on Disc 1/Disc 2: 1–15/Disc 3: 1–7)
- Terry Luttrell – lead vocals (Disc 1: track 1)
- Mike Murphy – lead vocals (Disc 1: track 5)
- Bruce Hall – bass (Disc 1: tracks 13–15/all tracks on Disc 2/Disc 3: 1–5, 7–8), lead vocals on "Back on the Road Again"
- Dave Amato – lead guitar (Disc 2: tracks 16–18/Disc 3: 8)
- Bryan Hitt – drums (Disc 2: tracks 16–18/Disc 3: 8)
- Jesse Harms – keyboards (Disc 2: tracks 16/Disc: 3: 8)

== Release history ==
| Region | Date | Label | Format | Catalog # |
|---|---|---|---|---|
| USA | August 10, 2004 | Epic/Legacy | 2-CD | E2K 86015 |
| USA | September 1, 2009 | Epic/Legacy | 3-CD (Limited Edition 3.0) | 88697 54093 2 |
