= The Hits (REO Speedwagon album) =

1988 greatest hits album by REO Speedwagon

Greatest hits album by REO Speedwagon
- Released: May 31, 1988 (US); April 30, 2002 (Remastered)
- Recorded: January 1976–April 1988
- Genre: Rock
- Length: 52:55
- Label: Epic
- Producers: Keith Olsen; John Stronach; John Henning; Gary Richrath; Kevin Cronin; Kevin Beamish; Alan Gratzer; David DeVore

REO Speedwagon chronology
Life as We Know It (1987)	The Hits (1988)	The Earth, a Small Man, His Dog and a Chicken (1990)

Singles from The Hits
- 1. "Here with Me" Released: June 1988; 2. "I Don't Want to Lose You" Released: November 1988

Professional ratings
Review scores
Source	Rating
Allmusic	4.5/5 stars
Robert Christgau	C

The Hits is a compilation album from REO Speedwagon. It contains hits such as "Can't Fight This Feeling" and "Keep on Loving You", as well as new tracks "Here with Me" and "I Don't Want to Lose You". "Here with Me" cracked the top 20 on the Billboard Hot 100. and the top ten on the Adult Contemporary chart; however, it would be the last single to feature drummer Alan Gratzer and guitarist Gary Richrath, as they each left the band within the year following this album's release. The album has sold over 4 million copies in the U.S. which led it to go 4× Platinum.

A conspicuous absentee from the album is "Keep the Fire Burnin'", which reached #7 on the Billboard Hot 100 in 1982. The collection is one of several released by the band's label. The album was remastered and reissued in 2002. The album was also re-released in 2020 on black and white vinyl.

Cash Box called "Here with Me" a "power ballad that lifts you up where you belong, a majestic and sweeping effort that has romanticism, leavened with pop sensibility." Cash Box called "I Don't Want to Lose You" a "hard-driving, corporate-sounding rocker."

== Track listing ==
Side one
No.	Title	Writer(s)	Album	Length
1.	"I Don't Want to Lose You"	Tom Kelly, Billy Steinberg		3:08
2.	"Here with Me"	Rick Braun, Kevin Cronin		5:05
3.	"Roll with the Changes"	Cronin	You Can Tune a Piano, but You Can't Tuna Fish (1978)	5:37
4.	"Keep on Loving You"	Cronin	Hi Infidelity (1980)	3:21
5.	"That Ain't Love"	Cronin	Life as We Know It (1987)	4:02
6.	"Take It on the Run"	Gary Richrath	Hi Infidelity	4:02

Side two
No.	Title	Writer(s)	Album	Length
7.	"Don't Let Him Go"	Cronin	Hi Infidelity	3:48
8.	"Can't Fight This Feeling"	Cronin	Wheels Are Turnin' (1984)	4:55
9.	"Keep Pushin'"	Cronin	R.E.O. (1976)	4:06
10.	"In My Dreams"	Cronin, Kelly	Life as We Know It	4:31
11.	"Time for Me to Fly"	Cronin	You Can Tune a Piano, but You Can't Tuna Fish	3:44
12.	"Ridin' the Storm Out" (live)	Richrath	Live: You Get What You Play For (1977)	5:51

CD edition track listing
No.	Title	Writer(s)	Producer(s)	Length
1.	"I Don't Want to Lose You"	Kelly, Steinberg	Keith Olsen	3:08
2.	"Here with Me"	Braun, Cronin	Olsen	5:05
3.	"Roll with the Changes"	Cronin	Kevin Cronin, Gary Richrath	5:37
4.	"Keep on Loving You"	Cronin	Kevin Beamish, Cronin, Richrath	3:21
5.	"That Ain't Love"	Cronin	Cronin, David Devore, Alan Gratzer, Richrath	4:02
6.	"Take It on the Run"	Richrath	Beamish, Cronin, Richrath	4:02
7.	"In My Dreams"	Cronin, Kelly	Cronin, Devore, Gratzer, Richrath	4:31
8.	"Don't Let Him Go"	Cronin	Beamish, Cronin, Richrath	3:48
9.	"Can't Fight This Feeling"	Cronin	Cronin, Gratzer, Richrath	4:55
10.	"Keep Pushin'"	Cronin	John Stronach	4:06
11.	"Time for Me to Fly"	Cronin	Cronin, Richrath	3:44
12.	"One Lonely Night"	Neal Doughty	Cronin, Gratzer, Richrath	3:23
13.	"Back on the Road Again"	Bruce Hall	Beamish, Cronin, Richrath	5:29
14.	"Ridin' the Storm Out" (live)	Richrath	John Henning, Richrath, Stronach	5:51
Total length:				61:07

== Personnel ==
REO Speedwagon

- Kevin Cronin – lead vocals, rhythm guitars, keyboards
- Gary Richrath – lead guitars
- Neal Doughty – keyboards, synthesizers
- Gregg Philbin – bass, backing vocals (tracks 9 and 12 on the original CD, tracks 10 and 14 on the reissue)
- Bruce Hall – bass, backing vocals (lead on track 13)
- Alan Gratzer – drums, backing vocals

Additional personnel

- Tommy Funderburk – backing vocals
- Eric Persing – additional synthesizers, programming

Production staff

- Keith Olsen – producer (1, 2)
- Kevin Cronin – producer (3–9, 11, 12, 13)
- Gary Richrath – producer (3–9, 11–14)
- Paul Grupp – producer (3, 11)
- John Boylan – executive producer (3, 11)
- Kevin Beamish – producer (4, 6, 8, 13)
- Alan Gratzer – co-producer (4, 6, 8), producer (5, 7, 9, 12), associate producer (13)
- David DeVore – producer (5, 7), production assistant (9, 12), package assembling, mastering
- John Stronach – producer (10, 14)
- Gary Lubow – production assistant (13)
- John Henning – producer (14)
- Joe Gastwirt – engineer
- Steve Hall – mastering
- Tony Lane – art direction
- Nancy Donald – art direction
- David Coleman – design
- Harry Mittman – photography
- Dennis Keeley – inner sleeve photography
- Malcolm Dome – liner notes
- Baruck-Consolo Management – management

Studios

- Recorded and Assembled at Pacific Studios (Chatsworth, California).
- Mastered at Future Disc (North Hollywood, California).

== Charts ==
Chart performance for The Hits
Chart (1988)	Peak position
Canada Top Albums/CDs (RPM)	62
US Billboard 200	56

== Certifications ==
Certifications for The Hits
Region	Certification	Certified units/sales
United States (RIAA)	4× Platinum	4,000,000^{‡}
United Kingdom (BPI)	Silver	60,000^{‡}
^{‡} Sales+streaming figures based on certification alone.

== Catalog numbers ==
- Original 1988 release: Epic Records OE/OET/EK 44202
- 2002 remastered CD release: Epic Records EK 86518
