= Arch Allies: Live at Riverport =

Live album by Styx and REO Speedwagon
- Released: September 26, 2000 (US)
- Recorded: June 9, 2000
- Venue: Riverport Amphitheatre, St. Louis, Missouri, USA
- Genre: Rock
- Length: 124:35
- Label: Sanctuary (US)
- Producer: James Young; Gary Loizzo; Joe Vannelli; Kevin Cronin

Styx compilations chronology
Extended Versions (2000)	Arch Allies: Live at Riverport (2000)	Styx World: Live 2001 (2001)

REO Speedwagon chronology
The Ballads (2000)	Arch Allies: Live at Riverport (2000)	Live:Plus (2001)

Arch Allies is a live album recorded by REO Speedwagon and Styx at Riverport Amphitheatre (now Hollywood Casino Amphitheater) in Maryland Heights, Missouri, a suburb of St. Louis. It was released on September 26, 2000, by Sanctuary Records, and a single DVD was also released on November 7, 2000.

Each band also released single live albums containing only their own tracks from this album. This includes songs cut from the combined release. The Styx songs were released alone as At the River's Edge: Live in St. Louis (also including the songs "Everything Is Cool" and "Lorelei") and the REO Speedwagon songs (including "Keep Pushin'", "Tough Guys" and "That Ain't Love") were released as Live Plus and Extended Versions.

== Background ==
According to REO Speedwagon vocalist/rhythm guitarist Kevin Cronin, the tour sampled on the album was the first time REO Speedwagon and Styx had ever played together, and "We hit it off so well, we ended up putting on a double live CD together. It’s just been a tremendous synergy between the bands on a personal level and on a musical level as well. Tommy Shaw and I have become really good friends."

== Reception ==
Professional ratings
Review scores
Source	Rating
Allmusic	3/5 stars
The Rolling Stone Album Guide	1/5 stars

Allmusic gave the video release a rave review, opining that both bands gave strong performances and gel together "surprisingly well" in the collaborative jam which ends the album. The review especially praised the performances of new Styx members Glen Burtnik, Todd Sucherman, and Lawrence Gowan, comparing the Styx lineup favorably to that of the band's commercial heyday.

== Track listing ==
=== Styx ===
Disc one
No.	Title	Writer(s)	Album	Length
1.	"Blue Collar Man (Long Nights)"	Tommy Shaw	Pieces of Eight (1978)	5:00
2.	"The Grand Illusion"	Dennis DeYoung	The Grand Illusion (1977)	5:39
3.	"Fooling Yourself (The Angry Young Man)"	Tommy Shaw	The Grand Illusion	6:18
4.	"Lady"	Dennis DeYoung	Styx II (1973)	4:47
5.	"Brave New World"	Tommy Shaw, James "J.Y." Young	Brave New World (1999)	5:43
6.	"Edge of the Century"	Glen Burtnik, Bob Burger	Edge of the Century (1990)	5:10
7.	"Heavy Water"	James Young, Tommy Shaw	Brave New World	5:50
8.	"Too Much Time on My Hands"	Tommy Shaw	Paradise Theater (1981)	5:23
9.	"Renegade"	Tommy Shaw	Pieces of Eight	7:24

Jam versions with REO Speedwagon
No.	Title	Writer(s)	Album	Length
10.	"Blue Collar Man (Long Nights)"	Tommy Shaw	Pieces of Eight	5:20
11.	"Roll with the Changes"	Kevin Cronin	You Can Tune a Piano, but You Can't Tuna Fish (1978)	5:58
Total length:				62:31

=== REO Speedwagon ===
Disc two
No.	Title	Writer(s)	Album	Length
1.	"Don't Let Him Go"	Kevin Cronin	Hi Infidelity (1980)	4:30
2.	"Music Man"	Kevin Cronin	R.E.O./T.W.O. (1972)	3:20
3.	"Take It on the Run"	Gary Richrath	Hi Infidelity	4:18
4.	"Can't Fight This Feeling"	Kevin Cronin	Wheels Are Turnin' (1984)	5:26
5.	"Time for Me to Fly"	Kevin Cronin	You Can Tune a Piano, but You Can't Tuna Fish	3:33
6.	"Back on the Road Again"	Bruce Hall	Nine Lives (1979)	7:09
7.	"Keep on Loving You"	Kevin Cronin	Hi Infidelity	3:26
8.	"Roll with the Changes"	Kevin Cronin	You Can Tune a Piano, but You Can't Tuna Fish	6:18
9.	"Ridin' the Storm Out"	Gary Richrath	Ridin' the Storm Out (1973)	5:11
10.	"157 Riverside Avenue"	Gary Richrath, Alan Gratzer, Terry Luttrell, Gregg Philbin, Neal Doughty	R.E.O. Speedwagon (1971)	7:39

Jam versions with Styx
No.	Title	Writer(s)	Album	Length
11.	"Blue Collar Man (Long Nights)"	Tommy Shaw	Pieces of Eight	5:20
12.	"Roll with the Changes"	Kevin Cronin	You Can Tune a Piano, but You Can't Tuna Fish	5:58
Total length:				62:04

The DVD of the show omits "The Grand Illusion" from the Styx set and "Roll With The Changes" from the REO Speedwagon set (although the jam version with Styx is still present at the end).

== Personnel ==
Styx

- Tommy Shaw - guitar, vocals
- Lawrence Gowan - keyboards, vocals
- James "J.Y." Young, guitar, vocals
- Glen Burtnik - bass, guitar, vocals
- Chuck Panozzo - bass
- Todd Sucherman - drums

REO Speedwagon

- Kevin Cronin - lead vocals, rhythm guitar, piano
- Dave Amato - lead guitar, backing vocals
- Bruce Hall - bass, backing and lead vocals
- Neal Doughty - keyboards
- Bryan Hitt - drums
