= List of first music videos aired on MTV =

This is a list of the first music videos broadcast on MTV's first day, August 1, 1981. MTV's first day on the air was rebroadcast on VH1 Classic in 2006 and again in 2011 (the latter celebrating the channel's 30th anniversary). The first hour on the air was broadcast again on August 1, 2016, and was called MTV Hour One, as part of VH1 Classic's planned re-launch as MTV Classic, MTV itself, and additionally streamed on the channel's Facebook page.

The first video to air on MTV was one emblematic of MTV's concept, the Buggles' "Video Killed the Radio Star", which was then immediately followed by a brief message about music and television coming together and then "You Better Run" by Pat Benatar. One hundred sixteen unique videos were played, spanning 209 spins over the first 24 hours; from the beginning, MTV used the rotation system and repeated popular videos throughout the day. "You Better You Bet" by the Who, which was also the first video to be repeated, "Just Between You and Me" by April Wine, and "In the Air Tonight" by Phil Collins were each played five times. Rod Stewart made the most total appearances that day with 16, with 11 of his videos being played.

Due to MTV being a brand new cable network, the first day featured numerous errors including playing clips at the wrong times, moments of dead air, videos that would not play correctly and other technical difficulties.

First music videos aired on MTV
Number	Song	Artist	Appearance (Note: This column indicates how many times the video was played on MTV's first day, and for videos with multiple plays on that day, which play it was. For example, an entry of "1/2" means that this was the first time the particular video was played that day out of two total plays.)	Notes
1	"Video Killed the Radio Star"	The Buggles	1/2	First music video ever aired on MTV
2	"You Better Run"	Pat Benatar	1/2	First female artist and first lead guitarist (Neil Giraldo)
3	"She Won't Dance With Me"	Rod Stewart	1/2	Bassist Phil Chen was the first non-white musician to appear on MTV
4	"You Better You Bet"	The Who	1/5	First top 5 US mainstream rock hit song on MTV
5	"Little Suzi's on the Up"	Ph.D.	1/3	
6	"We Don't Talk Anymore"	Cliff Richard	1/2	First Billboard Hot 100 Top 10 hit to play on MTV
7	"Brass in Pocket"	The Pretenders	1/2	
8	"Time Heals"	Todd Rundgren	1/3	
9*	"Take It on the Run"	REO Speedwagon	1/3	This was the first concert video to be aired on MTV, from REO Speedwagon's Live Infidelity home video release. The video was interrupted after 12 seconds due to technical difficulties. The technical difficulty moment contains only a blank black screen with a 200 Hz tone for a few seconds before going back to MTV's studio.
10	"Rockin' the Paradise"	Styx	1/3	
11	"When Things Go Wrong"	Robin Lane and the Chartbusters	1/2	
12	"History Never Repeats"	Split Enz	1/2	First song from an act from outside the United States or the United Kingdom
13	"Hold on Loosely"	.38 Special	1/3	
14	"Just Between You and Me"	April Wine	1/5	from Live in London, first Canadian song
15	"Sailing"	Rod Stewart	1/2	First artist to appear twice on MTV
16	"Iron Maiden"	Iron Maiden	1/2	1st Heavy Metal song to be played on MTV
17	"Keep on Loving You"	REO Speedwagon	1/3	First Billboard Hot 100 number-one hit to be played on MTV
18	"Bluer Than Blue"	Michael Johnson	1/2	
19	"Message of Love"	The Pretenders	1/4	
20	"Mr. Briefcase"	Lee Ritenour	1/2	
21	"Double Life"	The Cars	1/2	
22	"In The Air Tonight"	Phil Collins	1/5	
23	"Looking for Clues"	Robert Palmer	1/3	
24	"Too Late"	Shoes	1/1	
25	"Stop Draggin' My Heart Around"	Stevie Nicks and Tom Petty and the Heartbreakers	1/4	
26	"Da Ya Think I'm Sexy?"	Rod Stewart	1/2	Screen is blank while the audio still plays, stops after 27 seconds, next song plays.
27	"Surface Tension"	Rupert Hine	1/2	
28	"One Step Ahead"	Split Enz	1/3	
29	"Baker Street"	Gerry Rafferty	1/2	
30	"I'm Gonna Follow You"	Pat Benatar	1/3	
31	"Savannah Nights"	Tom Johnston	1/2	
32	"Lucille"	Rockestra	1/3	From Concerts for the People of Kampuchea
33	"The Best of Times"	Styx	1/3	
34	"Vengeance"	Carly Simon	1/1	
35	"Wrathchild"	Iron Maiden	1/4	
36	"I Wanna Be a Lifeguard"	Blotto	1/1	First surf rock song and first comedy rock song to play on MTV
37	"Passion"	Rod Stewart	1/2	
38	"Oliver's Army"	Elvis Costello	1/2	
39	"Don't Let Him Go"	REO Speedwagon	1/3	
40	"Remote Control / Illegal"	The Silencers	1/2	
41	"Angel of the Morning"	Juice Newton	1/1	First country video, and highest-ranking song on the Billboard Hot 100 for that week (#10)
42	"Little Sister"	Rockpile with Robert Plant	1/4	From Concerts for the People of Kampuchea
43	"Hold On to the Night"	Bootcamp	1/2	
44	"Dreamin'"	Cliff Richard	1/2	
45	"Is It You"	Lee Ritenour	1/3	
46	"Tusk"	Fleetwood Mac	1/1	
47	"He Can't Love You"	Michael Stanley Band	1/2	
48	"Tough Guys"	REO Speedwagon	1/2	
49	"Rapture"	Blondie	1/2	First rap music video on MTV
50	"Don't Let Go the Coat"	The Who	1/2	
51	"Ain't Love a Bitch"	Rod Stewart	1/1	
52	"Talk of the Town"	The Pretenders	1/3	
53	"Can't Happen Here"	Rainbow	1/3	
54	"Thank You for Being a Friend"	Andrew Gold	1/1	
55	"You Better You Bet"	The Who	2/5	First rerun music video to air on MTV
56	"Bring It All Home"	Gerry Rafferty	1/1	First fully animated music video to air on MTV
57	"Sign of the Gypsy Queen"	April Wine	1/2	from Live in London
58	"The Man with the Child in His Eyes"	Kate Bush	1/1	
59	"Message of Love"	The Pretenders	2/4	
60	"All Night Long"	Rainbow	1/2	
61	"Boys Keep Swinging"	David Bowie	1/2	
62	"Rat Race"	The Specials	1/2	First video to feature both black and white artists to air on MTV
63	"Just Between You and Me"	April Wine	2/5	from Live in London
64	"Once in a Lifetime"	Talking Heads	1/1	
65	"Victim"	Bootcamp	1/2	
66	"Tonight's the Night (Gonna Be Alright)"	Rod Stewart	1/1	
67	"Cruel to Be Kind"	Nick Lowe	1/1	
68	"A Little in Love"	Cliff Richard	1/2	
69	"Take It on the Run"	REO Speedwagon	2/3	
70	"Wild-Eyed Southern Boys"	.38 Special	1/2	
71	"Wuthering Heights"	Kate Bush	1/1	
72	"Celebrate the Bullet"	The Selecter	1/2	Second video to feature both black and white artists to air on MTV
73	"More Than I Can Say"	Leo Sayer	1/2	
74	"A Message to You, Rudy"	The Specials	1/1	
75	"In the Air Tonight"	Phil Collins	2/5	
76	"Heart of Glass"	Blondie	1/1	
77	"Oh God, I Wish I Was Home Tonight"	Rod Stewart	1/2	
78	"Kid"	The Pretenders	1/1	
79	"Wrathchild"	Iron Maiden	2/4	
80	"Come What May"	Lani Hall and Herb Alpert	1/2	
81	"I Got You"	Split Enz	1/1	
82	"Sister Disco"	The Who	1/2	From Concerts for the People of Kampuchea
83	"Fashion"	David Bowie	1/2	
84	"Stop Draggin' My Heart Around"	Stevie Nicks and Tom Petty and the Heartbreakers	2/4	
85	"Love Stinks"	J. Geils Band	1/1	
86	"Johnny & Mary"	Robert Palmer	1/2	
87	"Tomorrow Night"	Shoes	1/1	
88	"Lucille"	Rockestra	2/3	From Concerts for the People of Kampuchea
89	"Rockin' the Paradise"	Styx	2/3	
90	"Prime Time"	The Tubes	1/1	
91	"One Step Ahead"	Split Enz	2/3	
92	"Hold on Loosely"	.38 Special	2/3	
93	"Cruel You"	Shoes	1/1	
94	"Little Sister"	Rockpile with Robert Plant	2/4	From Concerts for the People of Kampuchea
95	"Calling All Girls"	Hilly Michaels	1/1	
96	"Keep on Loving You"	REO Speedwagon	2/3	
97	"I Was Only Joking"	Rod Stewart	1/1	
98	"You Better You Bet"	The Who	3/5	
99	"Time Heals"	Todd Rundgren	2/3	
100	"Let's Go"	The Cars	1/1	
101	"Just Between You and Me"	April Wine	3/5	from Live in London
102	"Mr. Briefcase"	Lee Ritenour	2/2	
103	"Fashion"	David Bowie	2/2	
104	"I'm Gonna Follow You"	Pat Benatar	2/3	
105	"Do You Remember Rock 'n' Roll Radio?"	The Ramones	1/1	1st punk band to be played on MTV
106	"Ridin' the Storm Out"	REO Speedwagon	1/1	
107	"Looking for Clues"	Robert Palmer	2/3	
108	"Little Suzi's on the Up"	Ph.D.	2/3	
109	"Is It You"	Lee Ritenour	2/3	
110	"You're in My Heart"	Rod Stewart	1/1	
111	"Talk of the Town"	The Pretenders	2/3	
112	"The Best of Times"	Styx	2/3	
113	"So Long"	Fischer-Z	1/1	
114	"In the Air Tonight"	Phil Collins	3/5	
115	"I Don't Want To Know"	Robin Lane and the Chartbusters	1/1	
116	"Don't Let Go the Coat"	The Who	2/2	
117	"Go Back Home Again"	Andrew Gold	1/1	
118	"Message of Love"	The Pretenders	3/4	
119	"Remote Control / Illegal"	The Silencers	2/2	
120	"Time for Me to Fly"	REO Speedwagon	1/1	
121	"Wrathchild"	Iron Maiden	3/4	
122	"She Won't Dance With Me"	Rod Stewart	2/2	
123	"Rough Boys"	Pete Townshend	1/1	
124	"History Never Repeats"	Split Enz	2/2	
125	"Dangerous Type"	The Cars	1/1	
126	"Turn It On Again"	Genesis	1/1	
127	"Rapture"	Blondie	2/2	
128	"Stop Draggin' My Heart Around"	Stevie Nicks and Tom Petty and the Heartbreakers	3/4	
129	"Can't Happen Here"	Rainbow	2/3	
130	"We're So Close"	Carly Simon	1/1	
131	"Tough Guys"	REO Speedwagon	2/2	
132	"Passion"	Rod Stewart	2/2	
133	"Kid Blue"	Louise Goffin	1/1	
134	"Little Sister"	Rockpile with Robert Plant	3/4	From Concerts for the People of Kampuchea
135	"Vienna"	Ultravox	1/1	
136	"Sign of the Gypsy Queen"	April Wine	2/2	from Live in London
137	"(What's So Funny 'Bout) Peace, Love, and Understanding"	Elvis Costello and the Attractions	1/1	
138	"Don't Let Him Go"	REO Speedwagon	2/3	
139	"I Won't Let You Down"	Ph.D.	1/1	
140	"Holiday"	Nazareth	1/1	
141	"You Better You Bet"	The Who	4/5	
142	"All Night Long"	Rainbow	2/2	
143	"Video Killed the Radio Star"	The Buggles	2/2	First music video ever aired on MTV
144	"You Better Run"	Pat Benatar	2/2	
145	"Surface Tension"	Rupert Hine	2/2	
146	"One Step Ahead"	Split Enz	3/3	
147	"Wild-Eyed Southern Boys"	.38 Special	2/2	
148	"In My Arms Again"	Shoes	1/1	
149	"Is It You"	Lee Ritenour	3/3	
150	"Oh God, I Wish I Was Home Tonight"	Rod Stewart	2/2	
151	"Passing Strangers"	Ultravox	1/1	
152	"Just Between You and Me"	April Wine	4/5	from Live in London
153	"Turning Japanese"	The Vapors	1/1	
154	"Rockin' the Paradise"	Styx	3/3	
155	"Bluer Than Blue"	Michael Johnson	2/2	
156	"Message of Love"	The Pretenders	4/4	
157	"Rat Race"	The Specials	2/2	First video to feature both black and white artists to air on MTV
158	"Roll with the Changes"	REO Speedwagon	1/1	
159	"In the Air Tonight"	Phil Collins	4/5	
160	"Hold On to the Night"	Bootcamp	2/2	
161	"Double Life"	The Cars	2/2	
162	"Take It on the Run"	REO Speedwagon	3/3	
163	"We Don't Talk Anymore"	Cliff Richard	2/2	
164	"Sister Disco"	The Who	2/2	From Concerts for the People of Kampuchea
165	"Celebrate the Bullet"	The Selecter	2/2	
166	"More Than I Can Say"	Leo Sayer	2/2	
167	"I Hope I Never"	Split Enz	1/1	
168	"Talk of the Town"	The Pretenders	3/3	
169	"Hold on Loosely"	.38 Special	3/3	
170	"Blondes (Have More Fun)"	Rod Stewart	1/1	
171	"Wrathchild"	Iron Maiden	4/4	
172	"Savannah Nights"	Tom Johnston	2/2	
173	"I'm Gonna Follow You"	Pat Benatar	3/3	
174	"Don't Let Him Go"	REO Speedwagon	3/3	
175	"Never Let Her Slip Away"	Andrew Gold	1/1	
176	"Time Heals"	Todd Rundgren	3/3	
177	"Brass in Pocket"	The Pretenders	2/2	
178	"Little Sister"	Rockpile with Robert Plant	4/4	From Concerts for the People of Kampuchea
179	"A Little in Love"	Cliff Richard	2/2	
180	"Da Ya Think I'm Sexy?"	Rod Stewart	2/2	
181	"Victim"	Bootcamp	2/2	
182	"Baker Street"	Gerry Rafferty	2/2	
183	"He Can't Love You"	Michael Stanley Band	2/2	
184	"Looking for Clues"	Robert Palmer	3/3	
185	"Stop Draggin' My Heart Around"	Stevie Nicks and Tom Petty and the Heartbreakers	4/4	
186	"Keep on Loving You"	REO Speedwagon	3/3	
187	"When Things Go Wrong"	Robin Lane and the Chartbusters	2/2	
188	"Little Suzi's on the Up"	Ph.D.	3/3	
189	"The Best of Times"	Styx	3/3	
190	"Sailing"	Rod Stewart	2/2	
191	"You Better You Bet"	The Who	5/5	
192	"Iron Maiden"	Iron Maiden	2/2	
193	"Can't Happen Here"	Rainbow	3/3	
194	"Oliver's Army"	Elvis Costello	2/2	
195	"Just Between You and Me"	April Wine	5/5	from Live in London
196	"Come What May"	Lani Hall and Herb Alpert	2/2	
197	"Tattooed Love Boys"	The Pretenders	1/1	
198	"In the Air Tonight"	Phil Collins	5/5	
199	"Peter Gunn Theme / Remote Control"	The Silencers	1/1	
200	"Dreamin'"	Cliff Richard	2/2	
201	"Lucille"	Rockestra	3/3	From Concerts for the People of Kampuchea
202	"Boys Keep Swinging"	David Bowie	2/2	
203	"Johnny & Mary"	Robert Palmer	2/2	
204	"Only the Strong Survive"	REO Speedwagon	1/1	
205	"Waiting for the Weekend"	The Vapors	1/1	
206	"You're Insane"	Rod Stewart	1/1	
207	"Kiss on My List"	Hall & Oates	1/1	
208	"Living in the Plastic Age"	The Buggles	1/1	
209	"Lonely Boy"	Andrew Gold	1/1	
