= Keep the Fire Burnin' (REO Speedwagon song) =

Single by REO Speedwagon

from the album Good Trouble
- B-side: "I'll Follow You"
- Released: June 1982
- Recorded: May 1982
- Genre: Rock
- Length: 3:53
- Label: Epic
- Songwriter: Kevin Cronin
- Producers: Kevin Beamish, Kevin Cronin, Alan Gratzer, Gary Richrath

REO Speedwagon singles chronology
"In Your Letter" (1981)	"Keep the Fire Burnin'" (1982)	"Sweet Time" (1982)

"Keep the Fire Burnin'" is a song by REO Speedwagon from their 1982 album Good Trouble. This single was the only track from the Good Trouble album to make the top ten on the pop charts, cresting at number seven.

== Background ==
It is also the only tune from the album to feature Kevin Cronin on keyboards (piano), which, although primarily the band's lead singer and acoustic/rhythm guitarist, he had begun using (in the studio) on the You Can Tune a Piano, but You Can't Tuna Fish album.

This is the only song from the band's Good Trouble album to have been performed live in its entirety following its supporting tour in 1983. Despite that fact, however, it is still a significant rarity in the band's setlists that has only been performed a handful of times over the last 35 years. In the past couple of decades, Kevin Cronin has played a shortened version of song during solo acoustic sets during REO concerts. More recently, in 2022 and 2023, the entire band has played a remixed version of the song in its entirety at select concerts. For unknown reasons, the song is the only one of the band's hit singles that was not included on their compilation album The Hits.

Cronin later said of the rushing to complete this song for the album:

I just wasn’t finished with the song, but we recorded it anyway. So I kind of took another look at it and changed a couple of chords. I didn’t even change the melody. All of a sudden the song came into focus. Now I actually really love the song and I really enjoy playing it. Sometimes, I’ll play it on acoustic guitar during the set and I really love it now. The problem is that I wasn’t ready yet. So I kind of finished the songs hurriedly and I wish I would have had a chance to really sit on them a little bit longer.

== Reception ==
Cash Box said that "the song isn't much different from a lot of the band's material since 'Roll with the Changes' and it's just a tad more melodic and uplifting than 'Don't Let Him Go.'" Billboard said that "urgent uptempo rhythms, surging organ and vaulting vocals all continue the platinum style perfected on Hi Infidelity."

== Personnel ==
REO Speedwagon

- Kevin Cronin – lead vocals, backing vocals, acoustic piano, acoustic guitar
- Gary Richrath – electric guitar
- Neal Doughty – organ
- Bruce Hall – bass
- Alan Gratzer – drums

Additional personnel

- Tom Kelly – backing vocals
- Richard Page – backing vocals

== Charts ==
=== Weekly charts ===
Chart (1982)	Peak position
Canada (CHUM)	2
Canadian RPM Singles Chart	10
Germany Media Control Charts	68
US Billboard Hot 100	7
US Top Rock Tracks	2
US Cash Box	10
US Radio & Records (R&R)	8

=== Year-end charts ===
Chart (1982)	Position
Canada (RPM Top 100 Singles)	88
US Billboard Hot 100	50
US Cash Box	63
