= In Your Letter =

- UK single cover

Single by REO Speedwagon

from the album Hi Infidelity
- B-side: "Shakin' It Loose"
- Released: July 1981
- Recorded: 1980
- Genre: Pop rock
- Length: 3:14
- Label: Epic
- Songwriter: Gary Richrath
- Producers: Kevin Beamish; Kevin Cronin; Gary Richrath

REO Speedwagon singles chronology
"Don't Let Him Go" (1981)	"In Your Letter" (1981)	"Keep the Fire Burnin'" (1982)

Music video
- "In Your Letter" on YouTube

"In Your Letter" is a song written by Gary Richrath that was first released on REO Speedwagon's 1980 album Hi Infidelity. It was released as the fourth single from the album and reached No. 20 on the Billboard Hot 100 chart. It peaked at No. 26 on the Billboard Adult Contemporary chart. It Canada, it reached No. 34.

== Lyrics and music ==
Richrath was inspired to write the song based on a real life incident. According to band member Kevin Cronin, at the end of a tour fellow band member Neal Doughty came home to find a letter from his wife on the kitchen table informing him that she had left him for another man. The other man turned out to be the person who supplied the band with their "illegal substances." According to Cronin, Doughty's response to the letter was "I'm really gonna miss that guy." Casandra Armour of vintagerock.com says that lyrics contain "cutting accusations with cruel alliteration like 'But you hid behind your poison pen and his pride' and 'You could have left him only for an evening let him be lonely.'"

Cronin has stated that the original version of the song very simple, very almost like '50s doo-wop melody and chord structure. The original chord structure was G Major, E Minor, C Major, D Major, similar to the Beatles' "This Boy".

The music of "In Your Letter" is a throwback to songs of the 1950s and 1960s. AllMusic critic Stephen Thomas Erlewine describes it as a "sun-kissed '60s homage." Billboard described it as having "the spunky charm of a 1960s pop song." Philippa Hawker of The Age describes it as "a grimly uptempo 60s style whinge." Leslie Michele Derrough of Glide Magazine describes it as sounding like a "1950s sock hop." Gerald Martineez described the song as "an uptempo tune about an angry lover complaining of the way he was dumped." Armour described the music as having a "dizzying doo-wop feel." Hawkins also noted a stylistic similarity with the Pointer Sisters' song "Should I Do It" from their 1981 Black & White album. In a demo version released on the 30th anniversary version of Hi Infidelity the guitar part has some rockabilly feel.

== Reception ==
Billboard said that "In Your Letter" is "filled with melody and solid hooks." Record World said that "a fluffy pop ditty straight from the early sixties." Erlewine calls "In Your Letter" a "great album track." KRTH program director Bob Hamilton felt that "In Your Letter" was "the most mass appeal cut" on Hi Infidelity and "the strongest cut on the album." Epic Records had originally wanted "In Your Letter" to be the follow-up single to the #1 "Keep on Loving You" until the band insisted that "Take It On The Run" should be the 2nd single from Hi Infidelity. Upon Richrath's death in 2015, Guitar Aficionado included "In Your Letter" as one of his top 10 finest moments with the band. Several of Richrath's obituaries acknowledged the song as one of REO Speedwagon's biggest hits. But Hawker complains that the song "is only bearable if you find the phrase 'In your letter, ooh ooh, in your letter' so filled with significance that you are happy to hear it repeated many, many times."

"In Your Letter" was included on several of REO Speedwagon's compilation albums, including The Essential REO Speedwagon.

== Personnel ==
REO Speedwagon

- Kevin Cronin – lead and backing vocals, acoustic guitar
- Gary Richrath – 6 and 12-string electric guitars
- Bruce Hall – bass
- Neal Doughty – acoustic piano
- Alan Gratzer – drums

Additional personnel

- Tom Kelly – backing vocal
- Richard Page – backing vocal
- N Yolletta – backing vocal

== Charts ==
Chart (1981–1982)	Peak position
Australia (Kent Music Report]	100
Canadian RPM Singles Chart	34
US Billboard Hot 100	20
US Adult Contemporary (Billboard)	26
US Cash Box	28
US Record World	28
US Radio & Records (R&R)	17

== Cover versions ==
- In 1982 the doo-wop group Randy and the Rainbows covered the song. It was featured on their album C'mon Let's Go.
- In 1989 the Japanese idol group Wink released a Japanese cover on their album Twin Memories.
- The song was recorded by Gary Richrath for his 1992 album Only the Strong Survive.
