= Don't Let Him Go =

Single by REO Speedwagon

from the album Hi Infidelity
- B-side: "I Wish You Were There"
- Released: June 1981
- Recorded: August 19, 1980
- Genre: Hard rock, power pop
- Length: 3:47
- Label: Epic
- Songwriter(s): Kevin Cronin
- Producer(s): Kevin Beamish; Kevin Cronin; Alan Gratzer; Gary Richrath

REO Speedwagon singles chronology
"Take It on the Run" (1980)	"Don't Let Him Go" (1981)	"In Your Letter" (1981)

Music video
- "Don't Let Him Go" on YouTube

"Don't Let Him Go" is a song written by Kevin Cronin. It was originally released as the opening song for REO Speedwagon's #1 album Hi Infidelity. It was also released as a single, reaching #24 on the Billboard Hot 100 chart. "Don't Let Him Go" has appeared on several REO Speedwagon greatest hits albums.

Cronin recalls "Don't Let Him Go" being the first song he wrote for Hi Infidelity. Like the #1 single from the album, "Keep on Loving You," the lyrics of "Don't Let Him Go" are about breaking up with a longtime girlfriend. According to Joseph Timmons of Seattle Post Intelligencer, the song is a "warning to not take the man you love for granted." Casandra Armour of vintagerock.com described the lyrics as having the singer pleading on behalf of a friend who has "a lot of swag but not much substance" but "just needs a chance to grow." Cronin has said that the song is based on the experiences of all the band members and is basically a plea to all their girlfriends to have patience with them.

Allmusic critic Stephen Thomas Erlewine remarked on the song's "insistent beat." He and other critics have also pointed out that the song was influenced by Bo Diddley. Cronin himself has stated that it is based on a slightly modified Bo Diddley beat. Author Chuck Eddy described it as a "Bo Diddleyed do-si-do." Armour describes the music as "a jaunty kind of hand-jive peppered with power chords." Pete Bishop of The Pittsburgh Press described "Don't Let Him Go" as a "straight-ahead melodic rocker." Allmusic critic Barry Weber described the song as an "underrated rocker." Record World said that "pounding drums, ringing guitars and synthesizer swooshes surround Kevin Cronin's lead vocal cry."

"Don't Let Him Go" was also included on the compilation albums The Hits and The Essential REO Speedwagon. A live version was included on The Second Decade of Rock and Roll, 1981-1991, Arch Allies: Live at Riverport, and Setlist: The Very Best of REO Speedwagon Live. In 1981, the band performed the song on the television show America's Top 10.

The band routinely opens its concerts with this song.

== Personnel ==
REO Speedwagon

- Kevin Cronin - lead and backing vocals, rhythm guitar
- Gary Richrath - lead guitar
- Bruce Hall - bass
- Neal Doughty - synthesizer
- Alan Gratzer - drums

== Charts ==
=== Weekly charts ===
Chart (1981)	Peak position
Canada (CHUM)	2
Canadian RPM Singles Chart	10
Belgium (Ultratop 50 Flanders)	27
Belgium (VRT Top 30 Flanders)	22
Netherlands (Dutch Top 40)	15
Netherlands (Single Top 100)	22
US Billboard Hot 100	24
US Top Tracks	11
US Cash Box	26
US Record World	22
US Radio & Records (R&R)	20

=== Year-end chart ===
Chart (1981)	Rank
Canada (RPM Top 100 Singles)	100
US (Joel Whitburn's Pop Annual)	146
