= Live Every Moment =

- UK cover

Single by REO Speedwagon

from the album Wheels Are Turnin'
- Released: July 1985 (US)
- Recorded: 1984
- Genre: Soft rock
- Length: 3:47
- Label: Epic
- Songwriter: Kevin Cronin
- Producers: Kevin Cronin, Gary Richrath, Alan Gratzer

REO Speedwagon singles chronology
"One Lonely Night" (1985)	"Live Every Moment" (1985)	"Wherever You're Goin' (It's Alright)" (1985)

"Live Every Moment" is a song written by Kevin Cronin that was first released on the band's 1984 album Wheels Are Turnin'. It was released as the fourth single from the album and reached the top 40 on the Billboard Hot 100.

== Lyrics and music ==
Creem critic Jon Young referred the opening lyrics of "Live Every Moment" – "Live every moment/Love every day/'Cause if you don't you just might throw your love away" – as "greeting card lyrics." Professor of Human Relations and Child Development F. Philip Rice described the song and these opening lyrics in particular as "a commentary on the shortness of life." Another theme of the song, and several others from Wheels Are Turnin', is Cronin's recovery from depression. Washington Post writer Tom Shales used the song as an example of how in 1985 MTV was reducing the time spent broadcasting "pseudo-macho" songs with "anti-social, pro-drug or satanic" messages in favor of "wholesome uplifter" songs. Shales regarded the lyrics of "Live Every Moment" (and another song he used as an example, Billy Joel's "You're Only Human (Second Wind)," as being "meant to discourage teenage suicide."

Billboard said that it is an "upbeat rock track" influenced by "country harmonies, Caribbean syncopation, [and] Latin percussion." Pittsburgh Press critic Pete Bishop also described the song as having a strong Latin music influence.

== Reception ==
Cash Box said that "with a tropical melody and a typically solid rock base [it] is an excellent summer single." Press staff writer Bill Novak said that it is "a lively upbeat song that gives you a good feeling inside," even though it has a "middle of the road sound." Charlotte Observer critic Kathy Haight described it as "pep-rallyish." Clarion-Ledger writer Billy Watkins later described "Live Every Moment" as one of REO Speedwagon's "major hits."

"Live Every Moment" was later released on the 2004 compilation album The Essential REO Speedwagon.

== Music video ==
John Weaver directed the music video for "Live Every Moment." The video uses footage from a live performance of the song from Kemper Arena in Kansas City that was shot using 10 cameras. It also incorporates behind-the-scenes footage of the band on tour. The post-production work was performed at the Unitel facility on the lot of Paramount Pictures.

The Paducah Sun reviewer Lydia Kolb said that the video "shows all the energy and fun" that REO Speedwagon puts into their live shows, and that "the positive message of the song is enhanced by lead singer Kevin Cronin's smiling deliverance and enthusiasm.

== Chart performance ==
"Live Every Moment" spent 11 weeks on the Billboard Hot 100 chart, peaking at number 34. It also reached number 34 on the Cash Box Top Singles list. In Canada, it peaked at number 83.
