= Richrath =

Richrath may refer to:

- Richrath (locality), locality in Langenfeld, Germany
- Gary Richrath (1949–2015), American guitarist
