= Good Trouble =

Good Trouble may refer to:

- Good Trouble (album), a 1982 album by REO Speedwagon
- Good Trouble (TV series), a 2019–2024 American drama series
- "Good trouble", a term used by American civil rights activist John Lewis
  - John Lewis: Good Trouble, a 2020 American biographical documentary film
