= I Do' Wanna Know =

Single by REO Speedwagon

from the album Wheels Are Turnin'
- B-side: "Rock 'n' Roll Star"
- Released: October 1984
- Recorded: 1984
- Genre: Rock, pop
- Length: 4:10
- Label: Epic
- Songwriter: Kevin Cronin
- Producers: Kevin Cronin, Gary Richrath, Alan Gratzer

REO Speedwagon singles chronology
"The Key" (1982)	"I Do' Wanna Know" (1984)	"Can't Fight This Feeling" (1984)

"I Do' Wanna Know" is a song written by Kevin Cronin that was the lead single from REO Speedwagon's 1984 album Wheels Are Turnin'. It was more of a rocker reminiscent of the songs REO Speedwagon had released in the 1970s than the ballads the band had been successful with in the early 1980s. It had limited success on popular music charts, which was blamed for delaying sales of the album until the release of the follow-up single, the ballad "Can't Fight This Feeling." The video to the song was nominated for several awards.

== Lyrics and music ==
"I Do' Wanna Know" was a throwback to the types of rockers REO Speedwagon had recorded in their earlier days. Allmusic critic Mike DeGagne described the song as "a turbulent ride of clean-cut guitar and up-and-down piano that comes off as well-crafted pop with a bite." Joel Draba-Mann of Johnston Publishing described the song as "a raw track that exhibits the transition the band was undergoing at the time, blending falling pop piano with crisp hard-rock guitar riffs. Digital audio's guide to compact discs described it as "rambunctious and danceable." Billboard writer Paul Grein described "I Do' Wanna Know" as being "bubblegum-edged."

The lyrics represent the singer's reproachment of a lover he believes is about to leave him. Draba-Mann points out that "Do'" in the title is not the affirmative "do" but rather an abbreviation for "don't."

== Reception ==
The single had only limited chart success. It peaked at #29 on the Billboard Hot 100, although it did better on the Billboard Mainstream Rock chart where it reached #5. The follow-up single from Wheels Are Turnin, "Can't Fight This Feeling," reached #1 on the Billboard Hot 100. Billboard writer Kim Freeman suggested that the release of "I Do' Wanna Know" before "Can't Fight This Feeling" could be regarded as an "oversight," However, lead singer Kevin Cronin, who authored both songs disagreed, stating that "At that point, we'd been out of the public eye for two years...and we wanted to re-establish ourselves as being back with our upbeat shuffle rock 'n' roll stuff," adding that the song "made its point" and that "not all singles are released to be hits." Cronin also said "We had a neat video for it. And it reminded us of our old bar band days, up-tempo, boogie, chugging rock 'n' roll type of stuff. We tried a wah wah pedal; it gets a great response live. Guitarist Gary Richrath expressed similar views, saying "I think it only got top 30 or so. To us it was a great record. We put out a rocker first because we are a live rock 'n' roll band; we wanted to reestablish that." Grein attributed the initial sluggish sales of Wheels Are Turnin prior to the release of "Can't Fight This Feeling" to the fact that "I Do' Wanna Know" "wasn't fully accepted at pop radio."

Despite its limited popularity, Musician magazine rated "I Do' Wanna Know" as REO Speedwagon’s "best single yet." Cash Box called the song "vibrant and hypnotic," saying that "REO Speedwagon is once again in top form" and that "the song seems to keep building all the way." Greg Kennedy of the Red Deer Advocate called it one of the few "winners" on Wheels Are Turnin', praising its "bouncy, hard-driving sound." UPI writer Frank Spotnitz said it's "the kind of song you're embarrassed to listen to – it's stupid but you find yourself tapping your foot anyway." Billboard called it "a spirited, exhuberant boogie."

"I Do' Wanna Know" was included on several REO Speedwagon compilation albums and several multi-artist compilation albums of hits from 1984. A live version was released on The Second Decade of Rock and Roll, 1981-1991, which DeGagne praised for being energetic while "keeping with [its] original form."

== Music video ==
Although "I Do' Wanna Know" was not the most successful single from the album, its video was nominated for four awards from the National Academy of Video Arts & Sciences (NAVAS), for performance by a group, direction, costumes and set design. The video was also nominated for a Billboard music video award for "Best Performance Group." "I Do' Wanna Know" video directors Sherry Revord and Kevin Dole also directed the video for "One Lonely Night," a later single release from Wheels Are Turnin', and made it as a sequel to the "comedic themes" of the "I Do' Wanna Know" video.

The campy-style video depicts a bratty youth who terrorizes his family and others, telling them that he does not want to know that they love him. When one of his terror attempts fail (he electrocutes himself with a toaster), he is immediately transported to a garden-like Heaven where God (Kevin in a "God 1" jacket), surrounded by his Angels (played by the other band members), wearing white uniforms like baseball players, tell the kid they do not want to hear how much he loves them. After some stop-animation during the guitar solo, they send him to Hell in a vertical-descending telephone booth, where the devil tells him the same thing.

== Personnel ==
REO Speedwagon

- Kevin Cronin – lead and backing vocals, acoustic guitar
- Gary Richrath – electric guitar
- Neal Doughty – organ
- Bruce Hall – bass
- Alan Gratzer – drums

Additional personnel

- Tom Kelly – backing vocals
- Richard Page – backing vocals

== Charts ==
Chart (1984)	Peak position
Canadian RPM Singles Chart	52
US Billboard Hot 100	29
US Top Rock Tracks	5
US Cash Box	28
US Radio & Records (R&R)	23
