= Roll with the Changes =

1978 single by REO Speedwagon

Single by REO Speedwagon

from the album You Can Tune a Piano, but You Can't Tuna Fish
- B-side: "The Unidentified Flying Tuna Trot"
- Released: May 1978
- Recorded: 1977–1978
- Genre: Rock
- Length: 3:49
- Label: Epic
- Songwriter: Kevin Cronin
- Producers: Kevin Cronin, Gary Richrath, Paul Grupp

REO Speedwagon singles chronology
"Ridin' the Storm Out (live)" (1977)	"Roll with the Changes" (1978)	"Time for Me to Fly" (1978)

"Roll with the Changes" is a song written by Kevin Cronin that was released on REO Speedwagon's 1978 album You Can Tune a Piano, but You Can't Tuna Fish. It was also released as the lead single from the album and reached number 58 on the Billboard Hot 100.

== Background ==
Cronin wrote "Roll with the Changes" after the release of REO Speedwagon's 1976 album R.E.O., for which Cronin had rejoined the band after a four year absence. He was inspired by a trip he took when the band moved from Illinois to California. He said that "I’m just driving along and started singing to myself, 'keep on rollin', keep on rollin', roll with the changes...' I didn't realize I was doing it, and I was like, 'Oh, wow, this is cool,' and some lyrics started coming to me and the next thing I know I’m steering with my knees." He eventually pulled over and wrote down the lyrics. He said that the song was autobiographical in the sense that "not only geographically but personally, emotionally I was rolling with the changes right about then."

When Cronin first presented the song to REO Speedwagon guitarist Gary Richrath, he was concerned that the song didn't have a chorus, but Richrath felt that it did. On Christmas Day 1977 while the rest of the band took the day off, Richrath recorded electric guitar solos that were used as fills between verses and for the intro and outro. Cronin added an acoustic rhythm guitar part that engineer Paul Grupp recorded to sound like a percussion instrument.

Cronin developed a piano part based on arpegiated chords and Cronin and keyboardist Neal Doughty developed a Hammond organ solo. Stephen Stills remarked that the organ solo had a vibe similar to his own song "Love the One You're With", and Cronin has acknowledged that Stills' song was probably an unconscious influence. Grupp said of the organ solo "We also realized, it would allow something magical to happen if Neal would hold one note, and play a solo around that. That note would drop in volume as the other notes hit, and then come back in volume as the other notes released, so it would intermodulate with them."

== Reception ==
Cash Box reviewed the single, saying that it "opens with a flowing piano riff that quickly develops into a dynamic, well-structured tune propelled by electrifying guitar licks." Billboard recommended the single. Allmusic critic Stephen Thomas Erlewine described it as REO Speedwagon's "first big anthem". The single peaked at number 58 on the Billboard Hot 100. It did better on the Cash Box Top 100, reaching number 48. In Canada, it peaked at number 65. Ultimate Classic Rock critic Matt Wardlaw rated it as REO Speedwagon's all-time 4th best song.

"Roll with the Changes" was included on several REO Speedwagon compilation albums, including The Hits in 1988 and The Essential REO Speedwagon in 2004. It was also included on the live album Arch Allies: Live at Riverport.

"Roll with the Changes" was included on the soundtracks for the 2011 film The Cabin in the Woods and for the 2013 film Jobs. It was also used in episodes of the TV shows The Neighborhood and For All Mankind. It was one of the songs played at the celebration in Chicago for Barack Obama's 2012 United States presidential election victory.
