= Time for Me to Fly =

Time for Me to Fly can refer to one of two songs:

- "Time for Me to Fly" (song), a song by REO Speedwagon from the 1978 album You Can Tune a Piano but You Can't Tuna Fish
- "Time for Me to Fly" (Jonas Brothers song), a song from the 2006 album It's About Time
