= Life as We Know It (REO Speedwagon album) =

Studio album by REO Speedwagon
- Released: 9 February 1987
- Recorded: April–December 1986
- Studio: Rumbo Recorders (Los Angeles)
- Genre: Rock
- Length: 40:19
- Label: Epic
- Producers: Kevin Cronin; Gary Richrath; Alan Gratzer; David DeVore

REO Speedwagon chronology
Wheels Are Turnin' (1984)	Life as We Know It (1987)	The Hits (1988)

Professional ratings
Review scores
Source	Rating
Allmusic	2/5 stars
Rolling Stone	(unfavorable)

Life as We Know It is the twelfth studio album by REO Speedwagon, released in 1987.

It features "That Ain't Love" and "In My Dreams", both of which were Top 20 hits while "Variety Tonight" reached #60 on the Hot 100. "One Too Many Girlfriends" showcased the growing tensions between band members Kevin Cronin and Gary Richrath. At one point, "New Way to Love" was considered for use in the film Top Gun.

This is the group's final studio release with Richrath and original drummer Alan Gratzer, as well as their final top 40 album to date.

== Track listing ==
Side one
No.	Title	Writer(s)	Length
1.	"New Way to Love"	Kevin Cronin	4:08
2.	"That Ain't Love"	Cronin	4:01
3.	"In My Dreams"	Cronin, Tom Kelly	4:30
4.	"One Too Many Girlfriends"	Cronin	3:57
5.	"Variety Tonight"	Neal Doughty	4:26

Side two
No.	Title	Writer(s)	Length
6.	"Screams and Whispers"	Kelly, Gary Richrath, Billy Steinberg	3:29
7.	"Can't Get You Out of My Heart"	Cronin, Kelly, Steinberg	3:33
8.	"Over the Edge"	Kelly, Richrath, Steinberg	3:56
9.	"Accidents Can Happen"	Bruce Hall, Jeffery B. Hall	4:20
10.	"Tired of Getting Nowhere"	Cronin	4:11

== Personnel ==
REO Speedwagon

- Kevin Cronin – lead vocals (1–8, 10), backing vocals (1, 3, 7, 10), rhythm "left side" guitar (1, 4, 5, 8, 9, 10), acoustic guitar (2, 3, 6, 7)
- Gary Richrath – lead guitar (1, 2, 4–10), rhythm "right side" guitar (1, 4, 5, 10), electric guitar (3)
- Neal Doughty – acoustic piano (1), synthesizers (2–10), organ (3, 4, 10), Emulator sax (6)
- Bruce Hall – bass, lead vocals (9)
- Alan Gratzer – drums

Additional musicians

- Steve Forman – percussion (3, 10)
- Greg Smith – baritone saxophone (1, 10), bass saxophone (1)
- Lon Price – tenor saxophone (1, 10), horn arrangements (1, 10), soprano saxophone (10)
- Paris Cronin – alto saxophone (10)
- Nick Lane – trombone (10)
- Rick Braun – trumpet (10)
- Lee Thornburg – trumpet (10)
- Bob Carlisle – backing vocals (2, 3, 4, 7)
- Tom Kelly – backing vocals (2, 3, 4)
- Julia Waters – backing vocals (5, 10)
- Maxine Waters – backing vocals (5, 10)
- Terry Wood – backing vocals (5, 10)

== Production ==
- Kevin Cronin – producer
- Alan Gratzer – producer
- Gary Richrath – producer
- David DeVore – producer, engineer
- Julian Stoll – assistant engineer
- Steve Hall – mastering at Future Disc (Hollywood, California).
- Dave Snow – art coordinator
- REO Speedwagon – cover concept
- Donald Ryan – cover artwork
- Aaron Rapoport – photography

== Charts ==
Chart (1987)	Peak position
Canada Top Albums/CDs (RPM)	73
Swedish Albums (Sverigetopplistan)	24
US Billboard 200	28

== Certifications ==
Region	Certification	Certified units/sales
United States (RIAA)	Gold	500,000^{^}
^{^} Shipments figures based on certification alone.
