= Good Trouble (album) =

Studio album by REO Speedwagon
- Released: June 1982
- Recorded: February–May 1982
- Studios: Sound City Studios (Los Angeles, California); Kendun Recorders (Burbank, California)
- Genres: Pop rock; arena rock
- Length: 37:57
- Label: Epic
- Producers: Kevin Cronin, Kevin Beamish, Alan Gratzer, Gary Richrath

REO Speedwagon chronology
Hi Infidelity (1980)	Good Trouble (1982)	Wheels Are Turnin' (1984)

Singles from Good Trouble
- 1. "Keep the Fire Burnin'" Released: June 1982; 2. "Sweet Time" Released: August 1982; 3. "The Key" Released: October 1982

Professional ratings
Review scores
Source	Rating
Allmusic	2.5/5 stars
Rolling Stone	3/5 stars
Sounds	5/5 stars

Good Trouble is the tenth studio album by REO Speedwagon, released in 1982 as a follow-up to Hi Infidelity. It peaked at #7 on the Billboard charts. The single "Keep the Fire Burnin'" gave the band a #7 hit on Billboard's Pop Singles Chart and a #2 hit on the Mainstream Rock Tracks chart, their highest-charting hit on this chart.

In 2013, the album was released on CD by UK-based company Rock Candy Records, with expanded liner notes and photos.

== Background and recording ==
REO Speedwagon lead vocalist/guitarist Kevin Cronin recalled, "After the huge success with Hi Infidelity... everyone was putting pressure on us to get back in the studio as quickly as we could to ensure we made the most of the situation. As I was the main writer, I was the person who had to get the songs done. But I told them I didn’t have enough of a good enough standard ready. I should have really stuck by my guns and refused to be badgered into recording until I was prepared. But in the end I went with the flow, and that was a mistake."

None of the songs from this album have been performed by the band in concert since 1983 except "Stillness of the Night" (which was performed in November 1984 at LaCrosse, WI), "Every Now and Then" (only played twice on the original tour, but also performed at Clarkston MI in July 1985), "Good Trouble" (which was performed one time each in 1984, 1989, and 1993), and "Keep the Fire Burnin'", which was played as an acoustic version in their two shows at Valencia, Venezuela during the "Live As We Know It Tour '87," was played occasionally after that, and became a fixture in the set again in 2012. "The Key" was part of a five-song medley the band performed during their 2001 tour.

== Track listing ==
Side one
No.	Title	Writer(s)	Length
1.	"Keep the Fire Burnin'"	Kevin Cronin	3:53
2.	"Sweet Time"	Cronin	3:08
3.	"Girl with the Heart of Gold"	Bruce Hall	4:24
4.	"Every Now and Then"	Gary Richrath	4:00
5.	"I'll Follow You"	Richrath	4:24

Side two
No.	Title	Writer(s)	Length
6.	"The Key"	Cronin	3:26
7.	"Back in My Heart Again"	Richrath	3:19
8.	"Let's Be-Bop"	Hall	3:14
9.	"Stillness of the Night"	Richrath	3:43
10.	"Good Trouble"	Cronin	4:08

== Personnel ==
REO Speedwagon

- Kevin Cronin – lead and backing vocals (except on "Let's Be-Bop"), acoustic piano on "Keep the Fire Burnin'", acoustic and rhythm guitars
- Gary Richrath – electric guitar
- Neal Doughty – keyboards
- Bruce Hall – bass, lead vocals on "Girl with the Heart of Gold" and "Let's Be-Bop"
- Alan Gratzer – drums, tambourine

Additional personnel

- Steve Forman – chimes and crotales on "Sweet Time", shaker on "The Key"
- Tom Kelly – backing vocals
- Richard Page – backing vocals

== Production ==
- Kevin Beamish – producer, engineer
- Kevin Cronin – producer, arrangements
- Alan Gratzer – producer
- Gary Richrath – producer
- Bruce Barris – assistant engineer
- Tom Cummings – assistant engineer
- Jeff Sanders – mastering
- John Kosh – art direction, design
- Ron Larson – art direction, design
- Aaron Rapoport – photography

== Charts ==
Chart (1982)	Peak position
Canada Top Albums/CDs (RPM)	18
Dutch Albums (Album Top 100)	39
German Albums (Offizielle Top 100)	17
Norwegian Albums (VG-lista)	7
Swedish Albums (Sverigetopplistan)	18
UK Albums (Official Charts)	29
US Billboard 200	7

== Certifications ==
Region	Certification	Certified units/sales
United States (RIAA)	2× Platinum	2,000,000^{^}
^{^} Shipments figures based on certification alone.
