= Sign of the Gypsy Queen =

Single by April Wine

from the album The Nature of the Beast
- B-side: "Crash and Burn"
- Released: 1981
- Studio: Le Manoir
- Genre: Hard rock
- Length: 4:18
- Label: Aquarius; Capitol
- Songwriter(s): Lorence Hud
- Producer(s): Myles Goodwyn; Mike "Clay" Stone

April Wine singles chronology
"Just Between You and Me" (1980)	"Sign of the Gypsy Queen" (1981)	"Enough Is Enough" (1982)

Audio
- "Sign of the Gypsy Queen" on YouTube

"Sign of the Gypsy Queen" is a song written and first recorded by Canadian singer Lorence Hud. The song became a hit in Canada when released as a single in 1973. Hud's version appeared on his eponymous debut album, released by A&M Records. The song reached the top 5 on the West Coast, #3 on CJRW-FM in Summerside, Prince Edward Island, and peaked at #16 nationally on the RPM 100 chart.

Canadian hard rock band April Wine recorded a cover version, releasing it as the second single from their album The Nature of the Beast (1981). The song reached #40 on the Canadian RPM Hot 100, #57 on the Billboard Hot 100, and #19 on Billboard's Mainstream Rock Tracks chart. It remains one of the band's most popular songs, appearing on many of their compilation album and becoming a staple of both their live set lists and Canadian classic rock radio.

== History ==
The song was first recorded by Lorence Hud at RCA's Toronto Studios in 1971, with Bill Misener of The Paupers producing. Bill wanted to sign Lorence but RCA did not move quickly enough, so A&M signed him instead. On Hud's recording he played all the instruments himself.

April Wine's 1981 cover version helped the song grow in popularity, charting on the pop and rock charts in both Canada and the United States. It remains a staple of classic rock radio in Canada and one of April Wine's signature songs.

== April Wine version ==
April Wine had greater success with a hard rock version of the song in 1981. It was the second single from their album The Nature of the Beast. The song reached #40 in Canada, and #57 in the United States on the Billboard Hot 100, and #19 on the Mainstream Rock Tracks.

This version has become popular on album-oriented rock radio stations, getting frequent airplay in the United States and Canada. A music video aired on MTV's first day of broadcast. It remains one of the group's signature songs and a live concert staple. The song has since been recorded by other artists.

== In popular culture ==
"Sign of the Gypsy Queen" appeared in the background of a scene in the American television series Breaking Bad episode "Granite State", in 2013. It also appeared, along with April Wine's song "Just Between You and Me", in the 1981 Canadian comedy film Gas.

== Charts ==
Lorence Hud (1973)	Peak position
Canada RPM Top Singles	16
Canada CJRW Summerside, Prince Edward Island	3
April Wine (1981)	Peak position
US Billboard Hot 100	57
US Top Rock Tracks	19
Canada RPM Top Singles	40
Canada CHUM Chart, Toronto	5
