= Enough Is Enough (April Wine song) =

Single by April Wine

from the album Power Play
- B-side: "If You See Kay"
- Released: 1982
- Studio: Le Manoir
- Genre: Hard rock; power pop; pop rock
- Length: 4:18
- Label: Aquarius; Capitol
- Songwriter: Myles Goodwyn
- Producers: Myles Goodwyn; Mike "Clay" Stone

April Wine singles chronology
"Sign of the Gypsy Queen" (1981)	"Enough Is Enough" (1982)	"Tell Me Why" (1982)

"Enough Is Enough" is a hard rock song by the Canadian rock band April Wine. It was written by Myles Goodwyn and appeared on the band's tenth studio album, Power Play (1982). The song was the first single released from the album and was a big hit in Canada and the United States.

The song reached No. 12 on the Canadian Top Singles, No. 50 on the Billboard Hot 100 and No. 9 on the Mainstream Rock Tracks, making it their biggest hit on the latter chart. "Enough is Enough" remains a popular classic rock song in North America, while CKKQ-FM "the Q" ranked it as the 146th best Canadian song of all time.

== Music video ==
The music video for the song was directed by Mark Longstreth and shows the members of April Wine inside the cab of a transport truck. The video was premiered on MTV in 1982.

== Charts ==
Chart (1982)	Peak position
US Billboard Hot 100	50
US Mainstream Rock (Billboard)	9
Canada CHUM Chart, Toronto	3
Canada Top Singles (RPM)	12
