= Is It You =

Is It You may refer to:

- "Is It You" (Cassie song)
- "Is It You" (Lee Ritenour song)
- "Is it You?", a song by Slapp Happy from their album, Ça Va
