= Power Play (April Wine album) =

Studio album by April Wine
- Released: July 1982
- Studios: Le Studio, Morin Heights, Quebec
- Genres: Hard rock; heavy metal
- Labels: Aquarius, Capitol
- Producers: Myles Goodwyn, Mike Stone

April Wine chronology
Review and Preview (1981)	Power Play (1982)	Animal Grace (1984)

Professional ratings
Review scores
Source	Rating
AllMusic	2/5 stars
Record Mirror	1/5 stars

Power Play is the tenth studio album by the Canadian rock band April Wine, released in 1982 (see 1982 in music). Music videos were made for the singles "Enough Is Enough", "If You See Kay", and "Tell Me Why". Power Play failed to meet the critical acclaim of the band's previous album, but the single "Enough Is Enough" managed to reach #50 on the Billboard Hot 100, spending 8 weeks on the chart. The album itself peaked at #37 on Billboard's 200 Album chart, remaining there for 20 weeks.

== Track listing ==
All tracks written by Myles Goodwyn unless otherwise noted.

1. "Anything You Want, You Got It" – 4:45
2. "Enough Is Enough" – 4:04
3. "If You See Kay" (David Freeland) – 3:51
4. "What if We Fall in Love" – 4:22
5. "Waiting on a Miracle" – 4:06
6. "Doin' it Right" (Tom Lavin) – 3:43
7. "Ain't Got Your Love" – 4:31
8. "Blood Money" – 5:22
9. "Tell Me Why" (John Lennon, Paul McCartney) – 3:16
10. "Runners in the Night" – 5:15

== Personnel ==
- Myles Goodwyn – lead vocals, guitars
- Gary Moffet – guitars
- Steve Lang – bass
- Brian Greenway – guitars, backing vocals
- Jerry Mercer – drums

== Charts ==
Chart (1982)	Peak position
Canada Top Albums/CDs (RPM)	14
German Albums (Offizielle Top 100)	47
US Billboard 200	37

== Certifications ==
Region	Certification	Certified units/sales
Canada (Music Canada)	Platinum	100,000^{^}
^{^} Shipments figures based on certification alone.
