= Can't Fight This Feeling =

1984 single by REO Speedwagon

Single by REO Speedwagon

from the album Wheels Are Turnin'
- B-side: "Break His Spell"
- Released: December 17, 1984
- Genre: Soft rock; arena rock
- Length: 4:54
- Label: Epic
- Songwriter: Kevin Cronin
- Producers: Kevin Cronin, Gary Richrath, Alan Gratzer

REO Speedwagon singles chronology
"I Do' Wanna Know" (1984)	"Can't Fight This Feeling" (1984)	"One Lonely Night" (1985)

Music video
- "Can't Fight This Feeling" on YouTube

"Can't Fight This Feeling" is a power ballad performed by the American rock band REO Speedwagon, written by lead singer Kevin Cronin. The song first appeared on the 1984 album Wheels Are Turnin'. The single reached number one on the Billboard Hot 100 chart and held the top spot for three consecutive weeks from March 9 to March 23, 1985. It was the second of the group's two number-one hits (the first being 1980's "Keep on Loving You", also written by Cronin) as well as their fourth and final Top 10 hit on the US charts. It also reached number sixteen in the UK. "Can't Fight This Feeling" has appeared on dozens of "various artists" compilation albums, as well as several REO Speedwagon greatest hits albums.

REO Speedwagon performed the song at the 1985 Live Aid concert; they were introduced by Chevy Chase.

== Background ==
Cronin said that he wrote the verses years before, and had made a demo of it when he left REO Speedwagon briefly in the mid-70s. Cronin finished writing the song in Hawaii while supposedly on a break from composing for the Wheels Are Turnin' album. According to REO Speedwagon drummer Alan Gratzer, the song is about a relationship Cronin had, and it took Cronin several years to come up with all the lyrics.

According to Cronin, the inspiration for the song was the hurt he felt when he became attracted to a woman who was part of his friend group. Cronin states that this woman was “…of course, going out with my friend, so I kept it to myself. There was a group of us who would hang out together...and she was always there. Eventually she and I were becoming friends, but there was no hanky-panky going on. The more I got to know her, the more I liked her, but I couldn't say anything about it.”

Cronin said that he was only able to finish the song when he "couldn't fight the feeling anymore and made the move to kind of go for it." He said he "knew those verses were something special because of the depth (of feeling). I felt for them. I couldn't force it." Cronin said that when he did express his feelings to the woman, they ended up having a great relationship, and although it did not last they remained friends.

Cronin described the theme of the song as being about "that moment in time where...it gets too painful to be where you are, and you know you have to change...but change is hard...and you overcome that fear of change."

The other REO Speedwagon members referred to "Can't Fight This Feeling" as "that stupid ballad" until it became a charting hit.

== Composition ==
"Can’t Fight This Feeling" is in the key of A major and a tempo of medium ballad with vocal range E4-A5, according to Musicnotes.com.

== Reception ==
Chicago Tribune critic Jan DeKnock said that the song "rode a pretty melody all the way to No. 1." DeKnock also said that it was "the latest in a series of ballads that have found success on the dance-dominated charts with a tried and true formula: A melody that is pretty enough for adult contemporary listeners, with instrumentation that is strong enough for rock-oriented radio stations. Billboard recommended the single, calling it a "midtempo rock ballad." Rapid City Journal writer Mike Sanborn called it one of REO Speedwagon's "best ballads."

In October 2007, Palm Beach Post music writer Leslie Gray Streeter compiled a list of the greatest power ballads and named "Can't Fight This Feeling" in 3rd place. Arizona Republic writer Andrew Means said that the song "has a similar tone of emotional frailty [as some ballads on Hi Infidelity], which revives comparisons with such so-called 'corporate rock' entities as Foreigner and Journey." Streeter attributes the song's success to its combination of "frighteningly candid emotion with searing rock guitar. However, Greg Kennedy of the Red Deer Advocate called it a "bland formula-fed composition."

Austin American-Statesman writer Drew Carr felt that the performance of REO Speedwagon keyboardist Neal Doughty was particularly effective on this song.

== Music video ==
Two different music videos exist for the song. Both videos have been shown at various times on VH1 Classic (now known as MTV Classic).

=== Version 1: Studio (videotape) ===
The videotaped version, directed by Bruce Gowers, was produced by MTV for a special on REO Speedwagon and features the band in the studio. It begins with Kevin Cronin playing the piano, attempting to find the key in which he can best sing the song (starting off in G major, he later decides he can sing it better in A). After Cronin exchanges some laughs with his bandmates, the original track of the song plays, with the band members miming their respective parts. It concludes with Cronin uttering the line, "That warmed the cockles of my cockles!"

=== Version 2: Film ===
The second more famous version, directed by John Jopson, makes various references to the life-cycle and shows the band singing the song.

== Personnel ==
REO Speedwagon

- Kevin Cronin – lead and backing vocals, acoustic guitar
- Gary Richrath – electric guitar
- Neal Doughty – piano
- Alan Gratzer – drums
- Bruce Hall – bass guitar

Other personnel

- Bill Cuomo – orchestration

== Charts ==
=== Weekly charts ===
Chart (1985)	Peak position
Australia (Kent Music Report)	2
Canada (CHUM)	2
Canada Adult Contemporary (RPM)	4
Canada (The Record)	5
Canadian RPM Singles Chart	1
Germany Media Control Charts	34
Irish Singles Chart	5
Radio Luxemburg Singles	13
New Zealand Singles Chart	33
South African Singles Chart	8
Swedish Singles Chart	15
UK Singles Chart	16
US Billboard Hot 100	1
US Adult Contemporary	3
US Top Rock Tracks	5
US Hot R&B/Hip-Hop Singles & Tracks	89
US Cash Box Top 100	1
US Radio & Records (R&R)	1

Chart (2011)	Peak position
US Rock Digital Songs	32

=== Year-end charts ===
Chart (1985)	Rank
Australia (Kent Music Report)	33
Canada (RPM Top 100 Singles)	33
US Billboard Hot 100	13
US Cash Box Top 100	10

== Certifications ==
Region	Certification	Certified units/sales
Canada (Music Canada)	Gold	50,000^{^}
New Zealand (RMNZ)	Platinum	30,000^{‡}
United Kingdom (BPI)	Gold	400,000^{‡}
United States (RIAA)	Gold	500,000^{^}
^{^} Shipments figures based on certification alone.^{‡} Sales+streaming figures based on certification alone.

== Bastille version ==
"Can't Fight This Feeling"

Single by Bastille featuring London Contemporary Orchestra

from the album Doom Days: This Got Out of Hand Edition
- Released: November 19, 2019
- Recorded: 2019
- Length: 3:18
- Label: Virgin EMI Records
- Songwriter: Kevin Cronin

Bastille singles chronology
"Another Place" (2019)	"Can't Fight This Feeling" (2019)	"What You Gonna Do???" (2020)

In 2019, English indie pop band Bastille released a cover version of the song, featuring the London Contemporary Orchestra. It was released on November 19, 2019, by Virgin EMI Records. The song was selected as the soundtrack to the 2019 John Lewis Christmas advert.

=== Charts ===
Chart (2019–2020)	Peak position
Belgium (Ultratip Bubbling Under Flanders)	23
Euro Digital Song Sales (Billboard)	7
Scottish Singles Sales (Official Charts)	4
UK Singles (Official Charts)	39

== Other versions ==
- In 2024, American singer JoJo released a cover of "Can't Fight This Feeling"; the song was from the soundtrack to the film Lisa Frankenstein.
