= Fantasy Girl =

1981 single by 38 Special

Single by 38 Special

from the album Wild-Eyed Southern Boys
- B-side: "Honky Tonk Dancer"
- Released: 1981
- Studio: Studio One
- Genre: Southern rock
- Length: 4:07
- Label: A&M
- Songwriters: Jeff Carlisi; Jim Peterik
- Producer: Rodney Mills

38 Special singles chronology
"Hold On Loosely" (1981)	"Fantasy Girl" (1981)	"Wild-Eyed Southern Boys" (1981)

Music video
- "Fantasy Girl" on YouTube

"Fantasy Girl" is a song by American rock band 38 Special and the second single from their fourth studio album Wild-Eyed Southern Boys (1981).

== Composition ==
"Fantasy Girl" is a midtempo song composed of "melodic guitar lines" and includes a guitar solo. The lyrics depict a man longing for an ideal lover who only exists in his imagination.

== Critical reception ==
Record World commented that the song has a "smooth vocal and a virtuoso guitar display." In his review of Wild-Eyed Southern Boys, Mike DeGagne of AllMusic considered "Fantasy Girl" among the tracks that "reveal a stronger regard for producing catchy and approachable rock & roll tunes."

== Charts ==
Chart (1981)	Peak position
US Billboard Hot 100	52
US Mainstream Rock (Billboard)	30
