= Wild-Eyed Southern Boys (song) =

1981 single by 38 Special

Single by 38 Special

from the album Wild-Eyed Southern Boys
- B-side: "First Time Around"
- Released: 1981
- Studio: Studio One
- Genre: Southern rock
- Length: 4:18
- Label: A&M
- Songwriter: Jim Peterik
- Producer: Rodney Mills

38 Special singles chronology
"Fantasy Girl" (1981)	"Wild-Eyed Southern Boys" (1981)	"Caught Up in You" (1982)

Music video
- "Wild-Eyed Southern Boys" on YouTube

"Wild-Eyed Southern Boys" is a song by American rock band 38 Special and the third single from their fourth studio album of the same name (1981).

== Content ==
The song celebrates the independent, rebellious spirit of a typical Southern youth. It opens with a story of reveling in a lively juke joint on a night.

== Critical reception ==
Mike DeGagne of AllMusic cited "Wild-Eyed Southern Boys" as one of the tracks from the album that "keep a homespun flavor alive and well, indicating that the band's Southern roots haven't been dismissed completely."

== Charts ==
Chart (1981)	Peak position
US Mainstream Rock (Billboard)	35
