= One Lonely Night (song) =

Single by REO Speedwagon

from the album Wheels Are Turnin'
- B-side: "Wheels Are Turnin'"
- Released: March 1985 (US)
- Recorded: 1984
- Genre: Soft rock
- Length: 3:20
- Label: Epic
- Songwriter(s): Neal Doughty
- Producer(s): Kevin Cronin, Gary Richrath, Alan Gratzer

REO Speedwagon singles chronology
"Can't Fight This Feeling" (1984)	"One Lonely Night" (1985)	"Live Every Moment" (1985)

"One Lonely Night" is a song performed by the American band REO Speedwagon, written by keyboardist Neal Doughty. The song is the third single from the band's 1984 album Wheels Are Turnin'. It peaked at No. 19 on the US Billboard Hot 100, making it the second best performing single from the album in the United States, although very far from the success of "Can't Fight This Feeling".

== Reception ==
Cash Box said that "One Lonely Night" was "even more appealing [than 'Can't Fight This Feeling'] for its chiming chorus and sentiment soaked lyric." Billboard described it as "solid but sentimental rock ballad." Greg Kennedy of the Red Deer Advocate called it one of the few "winners" on Wheels Are Turnin', describing it as a "soft-rock love ballad with a truly lush mix of instruments." Rapid City Journal writer Mike Sanborn called it one of REO Speedwagon's "best ballads." Wisconsin State Journal writer Dan Lindblade described it as an "optimistic song about the value of persistence." Chicago Tribune critic Jan DeKnock labeled the single the "dud of the week" when it came out, saying that it is a "sappy song" that proves that "when it comes to rock ballads, there's a very fine line between hit and miss." Music critic Tim Kelley called it ""yet another variation on the 'heard it from a friend' heartbreak formula that first put REO in the Top 10." Knight News Wire writer Rick Shefchik criticized the song as being "sludgy," whose primary audience is "late '20s to early '30s stockbrokers on cocaine." Allmusic critic Mike DeGagne said that the song "throws the spotlight on Cronin's voice, proving that his expertise at carrying out the slow stuff hasn't dwindled."

== Music video ==
The music video for "One Lonely Night" is a sequel to the video for the first single from Wheels Are Turnin', "I Do' Wanna Know" and, according to Billboard, incorporates similar comedic themes. It plays on a pun on the song title, telling the story of "one lonely knight." The video has a medieval setting, and starts out with a knight arguing with his spouse. He then walks out on her. The song begins playing and he encounters the lead singer Kevin Cronin who appears to be a wizard. The rest of the video follows the knight walking through the streets of a big and modern city. The video uses a lot of stop motion.

== Personnel ==
REO Speedwagon

- Kevin Cronin - lead and backing vocals, acoustic guitar
- Gary Richrath - electric guitar
- Bruce Hall - bass
- Neal Doughty - synthesizer
- Alan Gratzer - drums

Additional personnel

- Tommy Funderburk - backing vocal

== Charts ==
Chart (1985)	Peak position
Canadian RPM Singles Chart	35
Canada Adult Contemporary (RPM)	7
Poland (LP3)	34
US Billboard Hot 100	19
US Adult Contemporary	10
US Top Rock Tracks	17
US Cash Box	24
US Radio & Records (R&R)	17
