= Bootcamp (band) =

1980s American rock band

Bootcamp was an American rock band, popular in the early 1980s. Their songs included "Victim" and "Hold On to the Night". They were one of the first artists whose videos were shown on MTV's first day on air. Bootcamp originated in Baltimore, Maryland and had a loyal following there and in New York City, at various times sharing the concert bill with The Tubes, Squeeze, The B-52's and Split Enz. Bootcamp also acted as the support band for New York's R.A Questar, a vocal duo headed by the songwriters Robert Alan and Questar Welsh.

Original "Banzai Boy", Tim Camp has been recording and performing as "Slim Man" with the drummer Howie "Hit Man" Zizzi, since Bootcamp disbanded. Guitarist "Rockin'" Rob Fallin joins them for occasional shows. Camp hosted a smooth jazz radio show for a while.

In 2006, former Bootcamp keyboard player Tom Alonso composed and conducted the orchestral score for the film Swarm of the Snakehead, and Bootcamp contributed the songs "Victim" and "Woman's Touch" to the soundtrack.

Bootcamp: Back to the Shack! - Greatest Hits 1980-84 was released in 2007, on the Banzai Records label.
