= Wheels Are Turnin' =

Studio album by REO Speedwagon
- Released: October 31, 1984
- Recorded: January–August 1984
- Studios: Rumbo Recorders (Los Angeles, California)
- Genres: AOR, pop rock, arena rock
- Length: 39:31
- Label: Epic
- Producers: Kevin Cronin; Gary Richrath; Alan Gratzer

REO Speedwagon chronology
Good Trouble (1982)	Wheels Are Turnin' (1984)	Life as We Know It (1987)

Singles from Wheels Are Turnin'
- 1. "I Do' Wanna Know" Released: October 1984; 2. "Can't Fight This Feeling" Released: December 1984; 3. "One Lonely Night" Released: March 1985; 4. "Live Every Moment" Released: July 1985

Professional ratings
Review scores
Source	Rating
Allmusic	3/5 stars

Wheels Are Turnin' is the eleventh studio album by REO Speedwagon, released on October 31, 1984. It reached No. 7 on the Billboard 200. The lead single was "I Do' Wanna Know," which stalled at #29 on the Billboard Hot 100. The second single, "Can't Fight This Feeling", was REO's second and longest-running number one single. Other singles released were "One Lonely Night" and "Live Every Moment". These singles also reached the Top 40 of the Billboard Hot 100, reaching #19 and #34, respectively. The singles from the album also had success on other Billboard charts: "Can't Fight This Feeling" and "I Do' Wanna Know" each reached #5 on the Mainstream Rock chart, with "One Lonely Night" reaching #17, and "Can't Fight This Feeling" and "One Lonely Night" reached #3 and #10, respectively on the Adult Contemporary chart.

Billboard writer Kim Freeman suggested that the release of "I Do' Wanna Know" before "Can't Fight This Feeling" could be regarded as an "oversight." However, lead singer Kevin Cronin, who wrote both songs, disagreed, stating "not all singles are released to be hits." Paul Grein attributed the initial sluggish sales of Wheels Are Turnin' before the release of "Can't Fight This Feeling" to the fact that "I Do' Wanna Know" was not successful with pop radio stations and noted that sales began to take off only after the release of the second single.

In 2013, the album was released on CD by UK-based company Rock Candy Records, with expanded liner notes and photos. The LP version contained a cut-out stroboscope.

== Track listing ==
Side A
No.	Title	Writer(s)	Length
1.	"I Do' Wanna Know"	Kevin Cronin	4:12
2.	"One Lonely Night"	Neal Doughty	3:20
3.	"Thru the Window"	Bruce Hall, Jeffery B. Hall	5:01
4.	"Rock 'N Roll Star"	Cronin, Tom Kelly, Gary Richrath	3:40
5.	"Live Every Moment"	Cronin	4:56

Side B
No.	Title	Writer(s)	Length
6.	"Can't Fight This Feeling"	Cronin	4:54
7.	"Gotta Feel More"	Cronin, Kelly, Richrath	4:26
8.	"Break His Spell"	Richrath	2:57
9.	"Wheels Are Turnin'"	Cronin	5:47

== Personnel ==
REO Speedwagon

- Kevin Cronin – lead and backing vocals, acoustic guitar, rhythm guitar on "Thru the Window"
- Gary Richrath – electric guitar
- Neal Doughty – keyboards
- Bruce Hall – bass
- Alan Gratzer – drums

Additional personnel

- Steve Forman – percussion
- Tommy Funderburk – backing vocals
- Tom Kelly – backing vocals
- Richard Page – backing vocals
- Bill Cuomo – orchestration on "Can't Fight This Feeling"

== Production ==
- Kevin Cronin – producer, arrangements
- Alan Gratzer – producer
- Gary Richrath – producer
- David DeVore – assistant producer, engineer
- Julian Stoll – assistant engineer
- Steve Hall – mastering at Future Disc (Hollywood, California).
- John Kosh – art direction, design
- Ron Larson – art direction, design
- Randee St. Nicholas – photography

== Charts ==
Chart (1984–1985)	Peak position
Australian albums (Kent Music Report)	54
Canada Top Albums/CDs (RPM)	13
Swedish Albums (Sverigetopplistan)	40
US Billboard 200	7

== Certifications ==
Region	Certification	Certified units/sales
Canada (Music Canada)	Platinum	100,000^{^}
United States (RIAA)	2× Platinum	2,000,000^{^}
^{^} Shipments figures based on certification alone.
