= Ridin' the Storm Out (song) =

- 1973 single label

Single by REO Speedwagon

from the album Ridin' the Storm Out
- B-side: "Whiskey Night"
- Released: February 1974
- Length: 4:11
- Label: Epic
- Songwriter: Gary Richrath
- Producer: Bill Halverson

REO Speedwagon singles chronology
"Little Queenie" (1972)	"Ridin' the Storm Out" (1974)	"Open Up" (1973)

"Ridin' the Storm Out" is a song written by Gary Richrath and recorded by his band REO Speedwagon for their 1973 album Ridin' the Storm Out. It was released as a single in February 1974.

== Background ==
"Ridin' the Storm Out" began life during the band's tour the previous year, although the story of the song varies from there, some stories say Kevin Cronin and Richrath wanted to play a prank on the band's manager and pretend to get lost in a storm, only to actually get lost in one, while other stories claim the band got lost on a mountain and caught in a storm. as Cronin himself said about the song: "We had climbed this crazy cliff in Rocky Mountain National Park, just north of Boulder. I had no business being up there. But everyone else went, so I'm like, "Alright, I guess I've got to go too." We got to the top of this rocky cliff and we're sitting there. You know, in Colorado, the weather can change on a dime. When we left, it was a sunny, clear day. Here we are on top of this cliff, we look up and there's these dark clouds headed our way and they're coming in quick. It's one thing climbing up a cliff, climbing down is where it gets interesting. Especially if you're afraid that you're going to get caught in a blizzard. We obviously made it back to Boulder in one piece. I think that air raid kind of sound, came from the fact that we were in danger. We needed to get out and get away from where we were quick."

== Composition and lyrics ==
The track features vocals by Cronin's replacement Mike Murphy, after Cronin left the band during the sessions for the album. Although some fans believe Cronin did the vocals, as Cronin was the band's lead singer before the album was released. The intro, which features Neal Doughty performing octaves going higher in scales on a keyboard, drops slightly before the drums, bass and guitar, was suggested by Halverson, the producer of the song. According to Doughty, the intent was to make it sound like wind flowing through cabinet windows.

== Release and reception ==
"Ridin' the Storm Out" had received positive reviews, it had a "good mix of hard rock guitar sounds and harmony vocals" according to Record World when talking about the song. In 1977, the track was released as a single from their live album You Get What You Play For, the live version became the most successful version of the track, with that version peaking at number 94 on the Billboard Top 100 single chart.

== Charts ==
Chart (1977)	Peak position
US Billboard Hot 100	94
US Cashbox Top 100	97
