= Take It on the Run =

Single by REO Speedwagon

from the album Hi Infidelity
- B-side: "Someone Tonight"
- Released: March 27, 1981
- Recorded: 1980
- Genre: Hard rock, pop rock
- Length: 3:59 (album version) 3:39 (radio edit)
- Label: Epic
- Songwriter: Gary Richrath
- Producers: Kevin Beamish; Kevin Cronin; Alan Gratzer; Gary Richrath

REO Speedwagon singles chronology
"Keep On Loving You" (1980)	"Take It on the Run" (1981)	"Don't Let Him Go" (1981)

Live video
- "Take It on the Run" on YouTube

"Take It on the Run" is a song by American rock band REO Speedwagon off the band's ninth studio album Hi Infidelity (1980). The song was written by lead guitarist Gary Richrath. "Take It on the Run" was the follow-up single behind the group's number-one hit, "Keep On Loving You". The single went gold on April 17, 1989. "Take It on the Run" has appeared on dozens of "various artists" compilation albums, as well as several REO Speedwagon greatest-hits albums. The 2017 song "Messin' Around" by Pitbull featuring Enrique Iglesias interpolates "Take It on the Run".

== Background ==
The lyrics are sung by someone who suspects his partner of being unfaithful. While the singer claims "I don't believe it, not for a minute," he also says if it's true "then I don't want you around."

According to REO Speedwagon lead singer Kevin Cronin, the original title to the song was "Don't Let Me Down." Cronin said that:

As soon as I heard ["Don't Let Me Down"], I knew it could be awesome. This really grabbed me by the nuts. So, [lead guitarist Gary Richrath and I] then developed it together, and one of the things we did was change the title to "Take It on the Run". The opening line is so special: ‘Heard it from a friend, who heard it from a friend…’. Somehow, it captures the imagination and hooks you in.

Cronin says that he insisted that the title should be "Take It on the Run" and that he added the line to the refrain "You’re under the gun / So you take it on the run," which he says "either makes sense or it doesn’t, but it sure sung well and it sure rhymed, and it was a spur-of-the-moment thing that when I heard the rest of the song, that’s what I felt." The official songwriting credit names Richrath as the sole writer, but the liner notes for Hi Infidelity credit Cronin for "lyrical assistance".

Record World described it as a "power ballad" and said it was a "blockbuster."

According to Cronin, Epic Records was not convinced that "Take It on the Run" was good enough to be released as the follow-up single to "Keep On Loving You" and wanted to release "In Your Letter" instead, but the band insisted on releasing "Take It on the Run".

The song's music video was the ninth video played on MTV's first day, August 1, 1981. However, due to technical difficulties the video went to black just 12 seconds into the song, and never did finish.

Ultimate Classic Rock critic Matt Wardlaw rated it REO Speedwagon's all-time second greatest song.

== Personnel ==
REO Speedwagon

- Kevin Cronin – lead and backing vocals, acoustic guitar
- Gary Richrath – electric guitars
- Bruce Hall – bass
- Neal Doughty – synthesizers
- Alan Gratzer – drums
- Tom Kelly – backing vocals

== Charts ==
"Take It on the Run" was released as a single in 1981 and reached number five on the Billboard Hot 100 chart. It also reached number 19 on the UK Singles Chart.

=== Weekly charts ===
Chart (1981)	Peak position
Australia (Kent Music Report]	30
Canada (CHUM)	2
Canadian RPM Singles Chart	4
Germany Media Control Charts	55
Irish Singles Chart	14
Radio Luxemburg Singles	16
New Zealand Singles Chart	44
UK Singles Chart	19
US Billboard Hot 100	5
US Top Rock Tracks	6
US Cash Box	4
US Record World	3
US Radio & Records (R&R)	3

=== Year-end charts ===
Chart (1981)	Rank
Canada (RPM Top 100 Singles)	35
US Billboard Hot 100	32
US Cash Box	29

=== Certifications ===
Region	Certification	Certified units/sales
New Zealand (RMNZ)	Gold	15,000^{‡}
United States (RIAA)	Gold	500,000^{^}
^{^} Shipments figures based on certification alone.^{‡} Sales+streaming figures based on certification alone.
