= Keep On Loving You (song) =

1980 single by REO Speedwagon

Single by REO Speedwagon

from the album Hi Infidelity
- B-side: "Follow My Heart"
- Released: November 4, 1980
- Recorded: 1980
- Genre: AOR; soft rock
- Length: 3:20
- Label: Epic
- Songwriter: Kevin Cronin
- Producers: Kevin Beamish; Kevin Cronin; Alan Gratzer; Gary Richrath

REO Speedwagon singles chronology
"Time for Me to Fly" (1978)	"Keep On Loving You" (1980)	"Take It on the Run" (1981)

Music video
- "Keep On Loving You" on YouTube

Audio sample
- file; help

"Keep On Loving You" is a ballad written by Kevin Cronin and performed by American rock band REO Speedwagon. It features the lead guitar work of Gary Richrath. The song first appeared on REO Speedwagon's 1980 album Hi Infidelity.

It was the first REO Speedwagon single to break the top 50 on the U.S. Billboard Hot 100, reaching the number-one spot for one week in March 1981. The single was certified platinum for U.S. sales of over one million copies. It peaked at number seven on the UK Singles Chart.

"Keep On Loving You" has been a mainstay on 1980s soft rock compilations and has appeared on dozens of 'various artists' compilation albums, as well as several REO Speedwagon greatest hits albums. Ultimate Classic Rock critic Matt Wardlaw rated it REO Speedwagon's all-time greatest song.

== Background and recording ==
Kevin Cronin was inspired to write "Keep On Loving You" after learning that his wife had cheated on him.. He said that the song affirmed his belief that people can change, and if a relationship is worth saving then you should "give it all you've got."

Cronin stated that he wrote "Keep On Loving You" as a more traditional love ballad, and the band as a whole developed it into its final arrangement as a power ballad. He recounted:

I walked into rehearsal and sat down at the piano, which I rarely do because I'm a guitar player, and started playing "Keep on Loving You." ... And the guys in the band looked at me like I was from another planet. They were like, "What are you...?" because we were all bringing in songs for this record we were going to make and they looked at me like I was crazy. And I'm like, "Dude, this song really means a lot to me." [And they said] "So, dude, that's not an REO Speedwagon song." And I kind of was like, "You know what? I'm the main songwriter for REO Speedwagon, so if I write a song, it's an REO Speedwagon song. It's the band's job to turn it into an REO Speedwagon song." I was so passionate about this song. Everyone kind of got it and sure enough, Gary [Richrath] went over, plugged in his guitar and started playing power chords to this little love song I wrote. The next thing we knew, it was a number one record and everyone was calling it a power ballad and acted like we had this strategy for success that made this song happen when really it was just an accident.

Cronin said that he started playing the chords for the song on piano, which he had done "about 100 times" before without anyone else noticing, but one time Gary Richrath started playing on his Les Paul guitar. Cronin initially thought that Richrath was playing just to drown him out, but he then realized that "That's exactly what this song needs!", after which Cronin said that "the song took off from there." He claimed that before that the band felt the song sounded too much like Barry Manilow and that after the addition of Richrath's guitar chords he recognized that the original version sounded too sweet.

Epic Records did not think the song was good enough to be released as a single, but the band persuaded them to do so.

== Reception ==
"Keep On Loving You" received mixed to negative reviews from critics and audiences alike; it has been widely criticized for its dated and bombastic production style, sentimental lyrics, perceived "overplayed" nature and lack of originality.

Stephen Thomas Erlewine of AllMusic gave the song a positive review and said, "And so what if it does, because this is great arena rock, filled with hooks as expansive as Three Rivers Stadium and as catchy as the flu. That, of course, applies to the record's two biggest hits—the power ballad "Keep on Loving You" and the surging "Take It on the Run"—which define their era, but what gives the album real staying power is that the rest of the record works equally well."

Mike DeGagne criticized the song for giving the band "more appeal to FM radio and more commercial success", but also praised its instrumentation, describing it as "keyboard-guided melodies of its type, set adrift to Kevin Cronin's gentle, comfy-cozy vocals" and assuring that "No matter which instrument's riffs are heard, guitar or keyboard, they're polished and pristine, blanketed by lyrics that are simple yet overwhelmingly emotive."

In 2025 Ultimate Classic Rock critic Corey Irwin rated "Keep on Loving You" as the 11th greatest power ballad of all time. In 2013 Ultimate Classic Rock critic Matt Wardlaw rated it as REO Speedwagon's greatest song.

== Music video ==
In 1981, a video of the song was the 17th played on the first day of broadcast of MTV, on August 1. It was framed by a scene of Kevin Cronin talking about his relationship troubles with a female psychiatrist and contained a shot where a woman picked up a telephone connected to Gary Richrath's guitar, referencing the live version of "157 Riverside Avenue”.

== In popular culture ==
The song plays over the closing scenes of series 2, episode 3 of the British TV comedy Nighty Night, as well as being a playable option on a radio station in Grand Theft Auto: Vice City.

== Personnel ==
REO Speedwagon

- Kevin Cronin – lead and backing vocals, acoustic guitar, piano
- Gary Richrath – electric guitars
- Bruce Hall – bass
- Neal Doughty – Hammond organ
- Alan Gratzer – drums

Additional personnel

- Steve Forman – percussion
- Tom Kelly – backing vocal
- Richard Page – backing vocal
- Maggie Ryder – backing vocal

== Charts ==
=== Weekly charts ===
Chart (1980–1981)	Peak position
Australia (Kent Music Report]	3
Canada (CHUM)	2
Canadian RPM Singles Chart	2
Belgium (Ultratop 50 Flanders)	17
Belgium (VRT Top 30 Flanders)	14
Netherlands (Dutch Top 40)	13
Netherlands (Single Top 100)	9
Ireland (IRMA)	6
Radio Luxemburg Singles	4
New Zealand Singles Chart	22
South African Singles Chart	3
Swiss Music Charts	4
UK Singles (OCC)	7
US Billboard Hot 100	1
US Top Rock Tracks (Billboard)	9
US Cash Box Top 100	1
US Record World Singles	1
US Radio & Records (R&R)	2
West Germany (Media Control)	15

=== Year-end charts ===
Chart (1981)	Rank
Australia (Kent Music Report)	20
Canada (RPM Top 100 Singles)	17
Dutch Singles Chart	90
UK	80
US Billboard Hot 100	10
US Cash Box Top 100	4

== Certifications ==
Region	Certification	Certified units/sales
New Zealand (RMNZ)	Platinum	30,000^{‡}
United Kingdom (BPI)	Gold	400,000^{‡}
United States (RIAA)	Platinum	1,000,000^{^}
^{^} Shipments figures based on certification alone.^{‡} Sales+streaming figures based on certification alone.

== See also ==
- List of Billboard Hot 100 number-one singles of 1981
