= You Can Tune a Piano, but You Can't Tuna Fish =

Album by REO Speedwagon

Studio album by REO Speedwagon
- Released: April 1978
- Recorded: 1977–78
- Studios: Sound City, Van Nuys; Record Plant, Los Angeles; Paragon, Chicago
- Genres: Rock; arena rock
- Length: 33:47
- Label: Epic
- Producers: Kevin Cronin, Gary Richrath, Paul Grupp, John Boylan

REO Speedwagon chronology
Live: You Get What You Play For (1977)	You Can Tune a Piano, but You Can't Tuna Fish (1978)	Nine Lives (1979)

Singles from You Can Tune a Piano, but You Can't Tuna Fish
- 1. "Roll with the Changes" Released: May 1978; 2. "Time for Me to Fly" Released: July 1978

Professional ratings
Review scores
Source	Rating
AllMusic	4/5 stars
Rolling Stone	(favorable)

You Can Tune a Piano, but You Can't Tuna Fish is the seventh studio album by REO Speedwagon, released in 1978. It was their first album to be co-produced by lead singer Kevin Cronin and lead guitarist Gary Richrath. The album was REO's first to make the Top 40, peaking at No. 29. The album sold over 2 million copies in the US, which led it to being certified 2× Platinum.

This is the first album to feature Bruce Hall on bass, replacing Gregg Philbin. In 2013, the album was released on CD by UK-based company Rock Candy Records, with expanded liner notes and photos.

The hits "Time for Me to Fly" and "Roll with the Changes" have since become two of the band's best-known songs. "Time for Me to Fly" was later covered in a bluegrass arrangement by Dolly Parton on her 1989 album White Limozeen. In 2005, the album cover was featured on Pitchfork's list of "The Worst Record Covers of All Time", and in 2014 its title was featured in NME's list of "The 50 Worst Album Titles in History".

"Roll with the Changes" was featured in the 2011 movie The Cabin in the Woods. Cash Box said that it "opens with a flowing piano riff that quickly develops into a dynamic, well-structured tune propelled by electrifying guitar licks." The song was also briefly featured in the 2013 movie Jobs, and the sixth season of Cobra Kai.

== "Time for Me to Fly" ==
The song "Time for Me to Fly" peaked at No. 56 on the Billboard Hot 100 in 1978; despite this relatively modest peak position, it has become one of the band's best-known songs, and has received airplay on FM radio over the years. According to singer Kevin Cronin, the song was inspired by his breakup with his high school girlfriend. The song hit the top 40 in 2020 on Billboard's Digital Songs Chart after it was featured on Netflix's Ozark third-season episode, "Kevin Cronin was Here." It was also used in the films Vision Quest and Grown Ups.

== Track listing ==
Side one
No.	Title	Writer(s)	Length
1.	"Roll with the Changes"	Kevin Cronin	5:37
2.	"Time for Me to Fly"	Cronin	3:42
3.	"Runnin' Blind"	Debbie Mackron, Gary Richrath	3:08
4.	"Blazin' Your Own Trail Again"	Cronin	3:32
5.	"Sing to Me"	Richrath	2:34

Side two
No.	Title	Writer(s)	Length
6.	"Lucky for You"	Cronin, Richrath	5:02
7.	"Do You Know Where Your Woman Is Tonight?"	Richrath	2:53
8.	"The Unidentified Flying Tuna Trot"	Richrath	2:17
9.	"Say You Love Me or Say Goodnight"	Cronin, Richrath	4:58

== Personnel ==
REO Speedwagon

- Kevin Cronin – lead and backing vocals, rhythm guitar, piano (track 1)
- Gary Richrath – lead and rhythm guitars
- Neal Doughty – piano, Hammond organ, Moog synthesizer
- Bruce Hall – bass
- Alan Gratzer – drums

Additional personnel

- Lon Price – saxophone (track 9)
- Angelle Trosclair, Denise McCall, Denny Henson, Tom Kelly – backing vocals (tracks 1, 2, 4)

Production

- Paul Grupp – producer, engineer
- John Boylan – executive producer

== Charts ==
=== Album ===
Chart performance for You Can Tune a Piano, but You Can't Tuna Fish
Chart (1978)	Peak position
Australian Albums (Kent Music Report)	98
Canada Top Albums/CDs (RPM)	70
US Billboard 200	29

=== Singles ===
Chart performance for singles from You Can Tune a Piano, but You Can't Tuna Fish
Year	Single	Chart	Peak position
1978	"Roll with the Changes"	US Billboard Hot 100	58
1978	"Roll with the Changes"	US Cash Box Top 100	48
1978	"Roll with the Changes"	Canadian RPM Top Singles	65
1978	"Time for Me to Fly"	US Billboard Hot 100	56
1978	"Time for Me to Fly"	Canadian RPM Top Singles	90

== Certifications ==
Certifications for You Can Tune a Piano, but You Can't Tuna Fish
Region	Certification	Certified units/sales
United States (RIAA)	2× Platinum	2,000,000^{^}
^{^} Shipments figures based on certification alone.

== Release history ==
Release history and formats for You Can Tune a Piano, but You Can't Tuna Fish
Region	Date	Label	Format	Catalog #
United States	April 1978	Epic	Stereo vinyl	E-35082
United States	1978	Epic	Cassette	PET-35082
United States	1978	Epic	8-track	E35082
United Kingdom	July 1978	vinyl		
United States	2000	CD (Remaster)	EK-61613	
Japan	2011	Sony Music	CD (DSD-Remaster)	EICP 1488
United Kingdom	2013	Rock Candy	CD-24 bit audio (Remastered & Reloaded)	CANDY176
