= Hi Infidelity =

Studio album by REO Speedwagon
- Released: November 21, 1980
- Recorded: June–October 1980
- Studios: Crystal Studios (Los Angeles, California); Kendun Recorders (Burbank, California)
- Genres: AOR; pop rock; hard rock; arena rock
- Length: 34:55
- Label: Epic
- Producers: Kevin Beamish; Kevin Cronin; Alan Gratzer; Gary Richrath

REO Speedwagon chronology
Nine Lives (1979)	Hi Infidelity (1980)	Good Trouble (1982)

Singles from Hi Infidelity
- 1. "Keep On Loving You" Released: November 1980; 2. "Take It on the Run" Released: March 1981; 3. "Don't Let Him Go" Released: June 1981; 4. "In Your Letter" Released: July 1981

Professional ratings
Review scores
Source	Rating
AllMusic	4.5/5 stars
Robert Christgau	B−

Hi Infidelity is the ninth studio album by American rock band REO Speedwagon, released on November 21, 1980, by Epic Records. The album became a big hit in the United States, peaking at number one on the Billboard 200, spending 15 weeks at number one (only 27 albums, and only 7 rock acts, have spent at least 15 weeks at number 1). It went on to become the biggest-selling album of 1981, eventually being certified 10 times platinum by the Recording Industry Association of America.

Of the four singles released, "Take It on the Run" went to number 5 on the Billboard Hot 100, and the band got their first of two number one hits with "Keep On Loving You".

== Background ==
The album title is a play on the term "in high fidelity," which used to appear on album covers. The album art is an illustration of this pun where an act of sexual infidelity is apparently occurring while the man is putting an LP record to play on the hi-fi stereo.

== Songs ==
Six songs from the album charted on the Billboard charts, including "Keep On Loving You" which was the band's first Number 1 hit, and "Take It on the Run", which reached No. 5 on the charts. The song "Tough Guys" uses an audio clip from the Our Gang short film Hearts Are Thumps (1937).

"Tough Guys" was one of two songs from the album that charted on the Billboard Mainstream Rock chart despite not being released as singles. Music critic Robert Christgau called "Tough Guys" his favorite song from the album but suggested that the line "They think they're full of fire/She thinks they're full of shit" would prevent the song from reaching the pop Top 40.

Record World described "I Wish You Were There" as having a "novel gospel touch."

== Reissues ==
On October 25, 2004, the band recorded the songs of this album live from beginning to end for an XM Radio "Then Again Live" special.

On July 19, 2011, Sony Music re-released Hi Infidelity with bonus demo tracks for the album's 30th anniversary. Demo tracks were recorded Live at Crystal Studios, Hollywood, June through August 1980.

In 2024, the album was again remastered for vinyl reissue. It was also made available on streaming.

== Track listing ==
=== Original release ===
Side one
No.	Title	Writer(s)	Length
1.	"Don't Let Him Go"	Kevin Cronin	3:47
2.	"Keep On Loving You"	Cronin	3:23
3.	"Follow My Heart"	Tom Kelly, Gary Richrath	3:50
4.	"In Your Letter"	Richrath	3:20
5.	"Take It on the Run"	Richrath (Note: Although the song is officially credited solely to Richrath, the album's liner notes also list Kevin Cronin as providing "lyrical assistance".)	4:01

Side two
No.	Title	Writer(s)	Length
1.	"Tough Guys"	Cronin	3:51
2.	"Out of Season"	Cronin, Kelly	3:07
3.	"Shakin' It Loose"	Richrath	2:27
4.	"Someone Tonight"	Bruce Hall	2:41
5.	"I Wish You Were There"	Cronin	4:27

=== 30th Anniversary Edition (2011) ===
Disc one: Remastered Album
No.	Title	Length

Disc two: The Crystal Demos
No.	Title	Writer(s)	Length
1.	"Someone Tonight"	Hall	2:49
2.	"Tough Guys"	Cronin	3:35
3.	"In Your Letter"	Richrath	4:08
4.	"Follow My Heart"	Kelly, Richrath	3:57
5.	"Take It on the Run"	Richrath	4:01
6.	"Don't Let Him Go"	Cronin	4:20
7.	"Keep On Loving You"	Cronin	3:30
8.	"Shakin' It Loose" (Instrumental)	Richrath	2:32
9.	"I Wish You Were There"	Cronin	4:58
Total length:			33:54

== Personnel ==
REO Speedwagon

- Kevin Cronin – lead and backing vocals (except on "Someone Tonight"), acoustic and electric rhythm guitars, acoustic piano on "Keep on Loving You" and "I Wish You Were There"
- Gary Richrath – electric guitar
- Neal Doughty – keyboards
- Bruce Hall – bass, lead vocals on "Someone Tonight"
- Alan Gratzer – drums, tambourine on "I Wish You Were There"

Additional musicians

- Steve Forman – percussion on "Keep on Loving You"
- Tom Kelly – backing vocals
- Richard Page – backing vocals
- "N. Yolletta" – backing vocals on "In Your Letter"
- Maggie Ryder – backing vocals on "Keep On Loving You"

Technical personnel

- Kevin Beamish – producer, engineer
- Kevin Cronin – producer, arrangements
- Gary Richrath – producer
- Alan Gratzer – co-producer
- Tom Cummings – assistant engineer
- Jeff Eccles – assistant engineer
- Kent Duncan – mastering at Kendun Recorders (Burbank, California).
- Aaron Rapoport – photography
- John Kosh – art direction, design
- Bobby Gordon – lighting design
- John Baruck – management
- Al Quaglieri – reissue producer
- Joseph M. Palmaccio – remastering
- Laura Grover – remastering supervisor

== Charts ==
=== Weekly charts ===
Weekly chart performance for Hi Infidelity
Chart (1981–1982)	Peak position
Australian Albums (Kent Music Report)	6
Canada Top Albums/CDs (RPM)	2
Dutch Albums (Album Top 100)	7
German Albums (Offizielle Top 100)	18
New Zealand Albums (RMNZ)	34
Norwegian Albums (VG-lista)	17
Swedish Albums (Sverigetopplistan)	25
UK Albums (Official Charts)	6
US Billboard 200	1

=== Year-end charts ===
1981 year-end chart performance for Hi Infidelity
Chart (1981)	Position
Canada Top Albums/CDs (RPM)	2
Dutch Albums (Album Top 100)	38
German Albums (Offizielle Top 100)	51
US Billboard 200	1

1982 year-end chart performance for Hi Infidelity
Chart (1982)	Position
US Billboard 200	39

== Certifications ==
Certifications for Hi Infidelity
Region	Certification	Certified units/sales
Canada (Music Canada)	5× Platinum	500,000^{^}
United Kingdom (BPI)	Silver	60,000^{^}
United States (RIAA)	Diamond	10,000,000^{^}
^{^} Shipments figures based on certification alone.

== Release history ==
Release history and formats for Hi Infidelity
Region	Date	Label	Format	Catalog #
United States	November 21, 1980	Epic	Stereo vinyl	FE 36844
United States	November 21, 1980	Epic Records	Cassette	FET 36844
United States	1980	Epic	8-track	E36844
United Kingdom	April 10, 1981	Epic Records	vinyl	EPC84700
United States	1985	Epic	CD	EK 36884
United States	2000	Epic/Legacy	CD (Remaster)	EK 61614
United States	2011	Epic/Legacy	CD (30th anniversary 2 discs)	88697695792
Japan	2011	Sony Music	CD (DSD-Remaster)	EICP 1223
