= Time for Me to Fly (song) =

Single by REO Speedwagon

from the album You Can Tune a Piano, but You Can't Tuna Fish
- B-side: "Runnin' Blind"
- Released: July 1978 (US)
- Recorded: October 1977
- Genre: Rock
- Length: 3:43
- Label: Epic/CBS
- Songwriter: Kevin Cronin
- Producers: Kevin Cronin, Gary Richrath, Paul Grupp

REO Speedwagon singles chronology
"Roll with the Changes" (1978)	"Time for Me to Fly" (1978)	"Lucky for You" (1978)

Music video
- "Time for Me to Fly" on YouTube

"Time for Me to Fly" is a song by American rock band REO Speedwagon, released in 1978 as the second single from the album You Can Tune a Piano, but You Can't Tuna Fish. It was written by lead singer Kevin Cronin and took 10 years to write. The song originally reached number 56 on the Billboard Hot 100, but later reached number 34 on the Digital Songs chart after being used in Netflix's Ozark. It also reached number 90 on the Canadian charts. The song has a BPM of 81 BPM and plays in 4/4 time signature.

== Writing and recording ==
Cronin originally wrote the song in the early 1970s and he wanted to include it on the 1976 album R.E.O. but it was rejected by the album's producer John Stronach. After Cronin redid the song's arrangement and completed the chorus, the song was included on You Can Tune a Piano, but You Can't Tuna Fish, which was produced by the band.

Cronin said:

I had a demo version of this song on the same tape as the demo for "Keep Pushin'". I wrote it in Boulder, Colorado, inspired by the Rocky Mountains. However, John Stronach, who produced [the band's previous album] R.E.O., didn’t like the song. And the rest of the band agreed with him. It blew my mind that they judged it so harshly because it only had three chords. Their attitude was that didn’t sound like an REO song! For me, that was crazy. I was the singer and the writer, so that should have been enough to make it a song we could record. But it was still turned down. But for the next album, this song came up again, and I convinced Gary [Richrath], who co-produced it with me, that if it was arranged differently, then it would be very powerful and a proper REO track. And it's become the fulcrum of our live set. You can feel people's hair standing up whenever we start to play this. It send shivers down my spine, because it means so much to all of us.

Cronin also said:

I had a song, "Time for Me to Fly" on the You Can Tune a Piano but You Can't Tune a Fish album. One of our producers turned that down for 1976 R.E.O. album. It ended up a couple of years later on Tuna a.. He told me it was a crummy song; it only had three chords; it was too slow. It wasn't an REO Speedwagon song. I started thinking "I like this song. If somebody writes it who is in REO Speedwagon, how can it not be an REO Speedwagon song." The sound of a band has to come from the band itself. That's when we decided to fire our producer and start producing ourselves. There's a million ways you can play any song. One way seems to use the way the song wants to be.

== Lyrics and music ==
The lyrics of "Time for Me to Fly" are about a man who decides he's had enough of his lover and decides to leave her for good. They were inspired by Cronin's first breakup. The music has the sound of a country music ballad. Cronin plays an acoustic guitar using an open tuning.

== Reception ==
Cash Box praised the "melodic singing and acoustic guitar work...enveloping chorus and...catchy lyric." Record World said that it is "characteristic of the group's imaginative use of rock's common raw materials."

Ultimate Classic Rock critic Matt Wardlaw rated it as REO Speedwagon's all-time 3rd best song.

In 2021, REO Speedwagon's home state of Illinois used the song as "Time for Me to Drive" for a tourism campaign.

It was used in the 2010 film Grown Ups and in the "Kevin Cronin Was Here" episode of season 3 of the TV series Ozark. After the Ozark episode it returned to the charts, reaching number 34 on the Billboard Digital Song Sales chart and number 15 on the Hot Rock songs chart.

== Charts ==
Chart (1978)	Peak position
Canada RPM Top Singles	90
US Billboard Hot 100	56

Chart (2020)	Peak position
US Digital Song Sales (Billboard)	34

== Other versions ==
Dolly Parton recorded a bluegrass version for her 1989 album White Limozeen. It was released as the fourth single from the album in January 1990 and peaked at No. 39 on the U.S. Billboard Country chart.
