= Kevin Beamish =

American record producer

Kevin Keith Beamish is a Canadian-born American record producer, sound engineer, songwriter and mixer. Born in Montreal, Quebec, Canada, he became a naturalized American citizen at the age of nine.

Classically trained on woodwind instruments, he secured a recording deal for his band "The Weathervane" by the age of 16. Crystal Recording Studios hired him to be a studio assistant; short for make coffee, answer the phones and stand in the studio all day and night, learning and helping. His entrance into recording was while assisting on Cisco Kid by War, and offering a few lines to help them when they were stuck. Their songs were long, cascading jams and they were short on lyrics. Beamish added a few ideas, naively. Told quickly by a manager (after they used a few words he suggested), to never mention it again; when Beamish asked how he would be credited. This was a quick study on the publishing business and perils of the business.

During this time at Crystal, The Miracles were recording and he mixed his first number one, worldwide, #1 Record "Love Machine". It would catapult him into being one of the top recording engineers and producers for 30 years. "Love Machine" is a 1976 number-one single recorded by Motown group The Miracles, taken from their album City of Angels. This single was one of two Billboard Hot 100 Top 40 hits recorded by The Miracles with Billy Griffin as lead vocalist; the other is 1973’s "Do It Baby". Griffin had replaced Miracles founder and lead singer Smokey Robinson as lead singer in 1972. The song features a growling sound by Miracles tenor Bobby Rogers.

Kevin Beamish produced and engineered REO Speedwagon’s No. 1 album Hi Infidelity and sang parts on the hit single "Keep on Loving You", with 15 million albums and four million singles sold worldwide. Beamish produced five of REO's catalog.

Beamish produced and engineered/mixed Jefferson Starship's Winds of Change (1982), Saxon’s Crusader (1984) and Y&T's Contagious (1987). He started producing heavier rock such as Keel, Leatherwolf, and into the 1990s with Contraband and Michael Schenker Group.
