= Neal Doughty =

American keyboardist

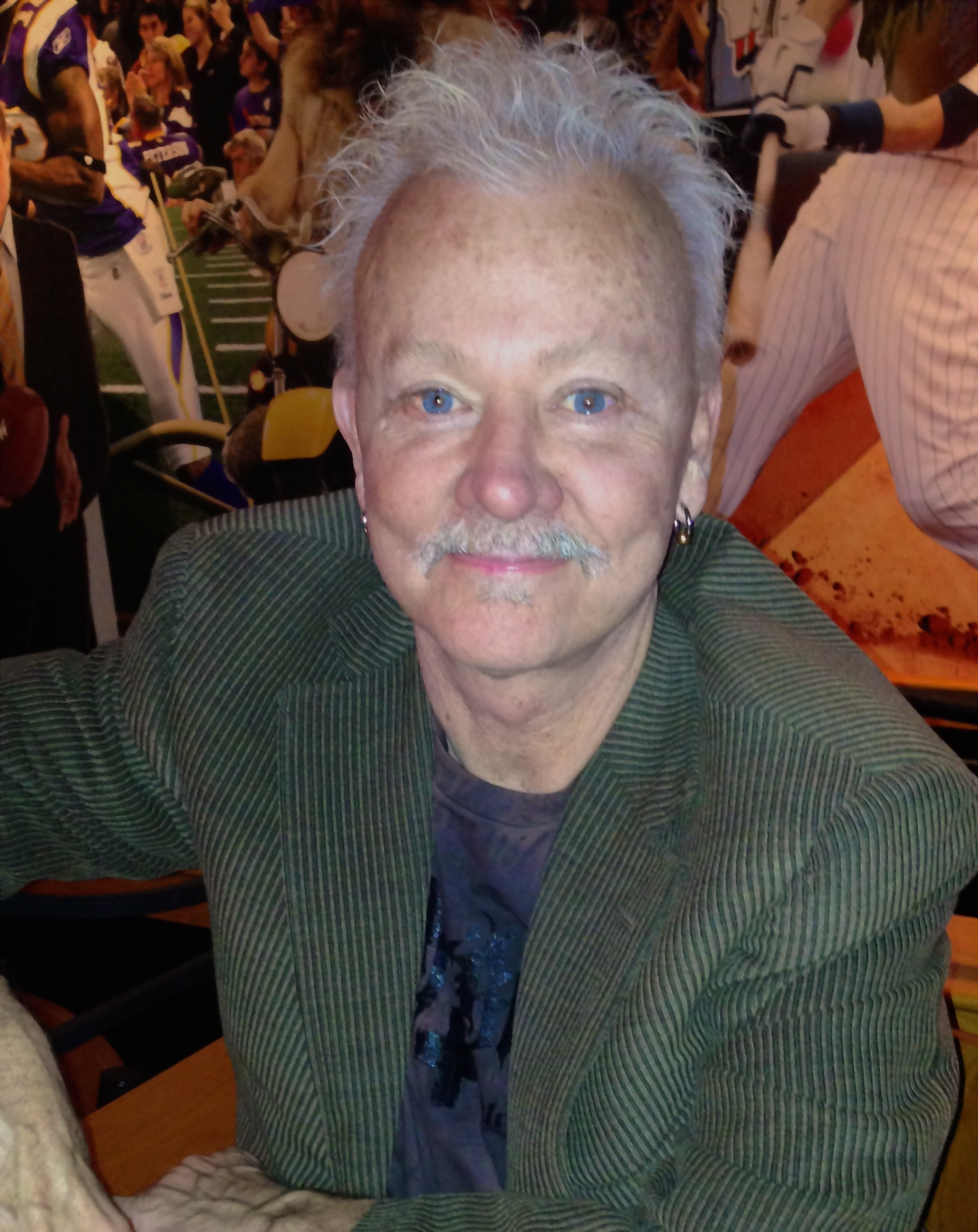
- Doughty in 2013

Background information
- Born: Neal Allan Doughty; July 29, 1946 (age 80); Evansville, Indiana, U.S.
- Genres: Rock
- Occupations: Keyboards; organ; piano; synthesizer; bass guitar; vocals
- Years active: 1967–present
- Member of: REO Speedwagon
- Website: nealdoughty.com

Neal Allan Doughty (born July 29, 1946) is an American keyboardist, best known as a founding member of the rock band REO Speedwagon and the only member to have played on every album. He formed the band in the fall of 1967, with original drummer Alan Gratzer (who left REO in 1988).

Although he has never been one of REO Speedwagon's primary songwriters, Doughty has written or co-written several of the band's songs. Songs for which he is the sole composer include "Sky Blues" from 1974, "One Lonely Night" from 1984 and "Variety Tonight" from 1987. The latter two songs charted as Billboard singles, with "One Lonely Night" cracking the top 20.

His most notable playing includes the Hammond organ solo on "Roll with the Changes" and the honky-tonk piano work on "157 Riverside Avenue". He notes the piano track to "Can't Fight This Feeling" was his most difficult studio performance, but is now his favorite part of live concerts.

He was an early adopter of the Moog synthesizer, which can be heard on the opening swoop of "Ridin' the Storm Out". Currently, he is using synths made by Korg and Yamaha and tours with a Hammond B3 organ routed through Leslie speaker cabinets. As of 2023, Doughty no longer tours with REO Speedwagon but remained an official member of the band until their retirement in 2024.

Doughty was born in Evansville, Indiana. He never took piano lessons but taught himself how to play on his mother's piano. He attended the University of Illinois on a scholarship, where he intended to become an electrical engineer due to being good at math. However, he struggled academically and when he became friends with a fellow struggling engineering student Alan Gratzer they eventually decided to form a band, with Doughty as keyboardist and Gratzer as drummer. They formed the band in 1967 and that fall Doughty came up with the band's ultimate name of "REO Speedwagon" after seeing the term "REO Speed Wagon" on a classroom blackboard. The band started touring the Midwestern United States and started releasing albums in 1971. As a result of the band's success, he left and did not return to the University of Illinois. However, he did eventually earn a computer science degree from Evansville College. He retired from touring with the band in 2023.
