= Gary Richrath =

American musician (1949–2015)

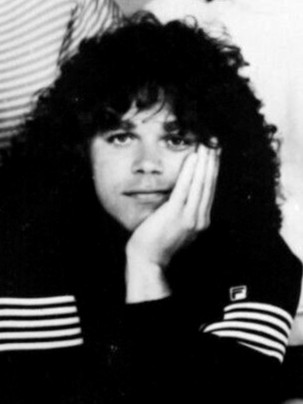
- Richrath in 1982

Background information
- Born: Gary Dean Richrath; October 18, 1949; Peoria, Illinois, U.S.
- Died: September 13, 2015 (aged 65) Wooster, Ohio, U.S.
- Genre: Hard rock
- Occupations: Musician, songwriter, producer
- Instruments: Guitar, vocals, slide guitar
- Years active: 1968–2015

Gary Dean Richrath (October 18, 1949 – September 13, 2015) was an American guitarist, best known as the lead guitarist and a songwriter for the band REO Speedwagon from 1970 until 1989.

== Early life ==
Richrath was born in Peoria, Illinois, on October 18, 1949, to Curtis and Eunice Richrath, and grew up in East Peoria. Originally playing saxophone in the school band, he took up guitar as a teenager, becoming self-taught. He graduated from East Peoria Community High School in 1967.

By 1968, Richrath was in a band called Suburban 9 to 5.

== REO Speedwagon ==
Richrath wrote, performed on and sang on some of REO Speedwagon's early hits, including "Golden Country" (1972), "Ridin' the Storm Out" (1973), "Find My Fortune" (1973), "Son of a Poor Man" (1973), "Wild as the Western Wind" (1974), "(Only A) Summer Love" (1976), "Flying Turkey Trot" (1976), "Only the Strong Survive" (1979) “In Your Letter” (1980) and "Take It on the Run" (1981). In 1977, he and other members of the band took over production, which resulted in the band's first platinum album. Along with playing lead guitar, Richrath sang lead vocals on "Find My Fortune" (1973), "Wild as the Western Wind" (1974), "Dance" (1975), "Any Kind of Love" (1976), "Only a Summer Love" (1976), "Breakaway" (1976) and "Tonight" (1976).

== Solo career, later years, and occasional one-off reunions with REO Speedwagon ==
Richrath left the band in 1989. Shortly after his departure, Richrath assembled a namesake band, Richrath. The band Richrath released the album Only the Strong Survive in 1992. Richrath continued to perform for several years before disbanding in the late 1990s.

On November 22, 2013, REO Speedwagon and Styx announced a benefit concert titled "Rock to the Rescue" to raise money for families affected by a tornado in central Illinois. The concert was held on December 4, 2013 in Bloomington, Illinois. Richrath reunited with the band for a performance of "Ridin' the Storm Out" to end their set at the sold-out concert. Richrath stayed on stage to help with the encore of "With a Little Help from My Friends" along with REO Speedwagon, Styx, Richard Marx and others. Families affected by the storm and first-responders sat near the stage at this concert.

== Death ==
Richrath died on September 13, 2015, with news of his death confirmed by his former REO Speedwagon bandmate Kevin Cronin. He was 65 years old. Speaking to the Songfacts website in 2017, Cronin disclosed the cause of Richrath's death: "He had some stomach problem or something and he went in the hospital to get treated for a stomach ailment and there were complications and he didn't make it."

== Discography ==
=== with Richrath ===
- Only the Strong Survive (1992)

=== with REO Speedwagon ===
- R.E.O. Speedwagon (1971)
- R.E.O./T.W.O. (1972)
- Ridin' the Storm Out (1973)
- Lost in a Dream (1974)
- This Time We Mean It (1975)
- R.E.O. (1976)
- Live: You Get What You Play For (1977)
- You Can Tune a Piano, but You Can't Tuna Fish (1978)
- Nine Lives (1979)
- Hi Infidelity (1980)
- Good Trouble (1982)
- Wheels Are Turnin' (1984)
- Life as We Know It (1987)
- The Hits (1988) (2 new songs: "I Don't Want to Lose You", "Here with Me")
