= Come Sail Away – The Styx Anthology =

2004 greatest hits album by Styx

Come Sail Away - The Styx Anthology

Greatest hits album by Styx
- Released: May 4, 2004
- Recorded: 1972–1997, 2003
- Genre: Rock
- Length: 149:55
- Label: A&M
- Producer: Various

Styx compilation chronology
21st Century Live (2003)	Come Sail Away - The Styx Anthology (2004)	The Complete Wooden Nickel Recordings (2005)

Come Sail Away – The Styx Anthology is a greatest hits album by Styx, released on May 4, 2004. It is a compilation consisting of two compact discs and contains a thorough history of the band. The album encompasses many of the band's most popular and significant songs, ranging from the band's first single from their self-titled album, "Best Thing", through the song "One with Everything", a track included on Styx's most recent album at the time of release, Cyclorama.

In 2006, the album was re-released and repackaged as part of the Gold series.

== Track listing ==
Disc one
No.	Title	Writer(s)	Original album	Length
1.	"Best Thing"	Dennis DeYoung, James Young	Styx, 1972	3:15
2.	"You Need Love"	DeYoung	Styx II, 1973	3:44
3.	"Lady"	DeYoung	Styx II	2:58
4.	"Winner Take All"	DeYoung, Charles Lofrano	The Serpent Is Rising, 1973	3:05
5.	"Rock and Roll Feeling"	John Curulewski, Young	Man of Miracles, 1974	3:02
6.	"Light Up"	DeYoung	Equinox, 1975	4:21
7.	"Lorelei"	DeYoung, Young	Equinox	3:23
8.	"Prelude 12"	Curulewski	Equinox	1:20
9.	"Suite Madame Blue"	DeYoung	Equinox	6:33
10.	"Shooz"	Tommy Shaw, Young	Crystal Ball, 1976	4:47
11.	"Mademoiselle"	DeYoung, Shaw	Crystal Ball	4:00
12.	"Crystal Ball"	Shaw	Crystal Ball	4:34
13.	"The Grand Illusion"	DeYoung	The Grand Illusion, 1977	4:37
14.	"Fooling Yourself (The Angry Young Man)"	Shaw	The Grand Illusion	5:31
15.	"Come Sail Away"	DeYoung	The Grand Illusion	6:05
16.	"Miss America"	Young	The Grand Illusion	4:58
17.	"Man in the Wilderness" (Extended version previously unissued)	Shaw	Originally from The Grand Illusion	6:57

Disc two
No.	Title	Writer(s)	Original album	Length
1.	"Blue Collar Man (Long Nights)"	Shaw	Pieces of Eight, 1978	4:06
2.	"Sing for the Day"	Shaw	Pieces of Eight	4:57
3.	"Renegade"	Shaw	Pieces of Eight	4:13
4.	"Pieces of Eight"	DeYoung	Pieces of Eight	4:45
5.	"Lights"	DeYoung, Shaw	Cornerstone, 1979	4:38
6.	"Babe"	DeYoung	Cornerstone	4:27
7.	"Borrowed Time"	DeYoung, Shaw	Cornerstone	4:59
8.	"Boat on the River"	Shaw	Cornerstone	3:13
9.	"A.D. 1928"	DeYoung	Paradise Theatre, 1981	1:07
10.	"Rockin' the Paradise"	DeYoung, Young, Shaw	Paradise Theatre	3:35
11.	"Too Much Time on My Hands"	Shaw	Paradise Theatre	4:33
12.	"The Best of Times"	DeYoung	Paradise Theatre	4:19
13.	"Snowblind"	Young, DeYoung	Paradise Theatre	4:59
14.	"Mr. Roboto"	DeYoung	Kilroy Was Here, 1983	5:28
15.	"Love Is the Ritual"	Glen Burtnik, Plinky Giglio	Edge of the Century, 1990	3:49
16.	"Show Me the Way"	DeYoung	Edge of the Century	4:37
17.	"Dear John"	Shaw	Return to Paradise, 1997	3:04
18.	"One with Everything"	Burtnik, Lawrence Gowan, Shaw, Todd Sucherman, Young	Cyclorama, 2003	5:56

== Personnel ==
- Dennis DeYoung - Keyboards, Vocals (Disc 1 Tracks 1–17, Disc 2 Tracks 1–17)
- Tommy Shaw - Guitars, Vocals (Disc 1 Tracks 10–17, Disc 2 Tracks 1–14, 17–18)
- James Young - Guitars, Vocals
- Chuck Panozzo - Bass Guitar
- John Panozzo - Drums (Disc 1 Tracks 1–17, Disc 2 Tracks 1–16)
- Lawrence Gowan - Keyboards, Vocals (Disc 2 Track 18)
- Glen Burtnik - Guitars, Bass Guitar, Vocals (Disc 2 Tracks 15–16, 18)
- Todd Sucherman - Drums (Disc 2 Track 18)
- John Curulewski - Guitars, Vocals (Disc 1 Tracks 1–9)

== Charts ==
Chart (2004)	Peak position
US Billboard 200	136
