= The Complete Wooden Nickel Recordings =

Compilation album by Styx
- Released: February 15, 2005
- Recorded: 1971–1974
- Genre: Rock
- Length: 147:49
- Label: Hip-O
- Producer: Bill Traut

Styx compilation chronology
Come Sail Away - The Styx Anthology (2004)	The Complete Wooden Nickel Recordings (2005)	One with Everything: Styx and the Contemporary Youth Orchestra (2006)

Professional ratings
Review scores
Source	Rating
Allmusic	4/5 stars

The Complete Wooden Nickel Recordings is a 2-Disc set released by Styx in 2005. The compilation contains remastered versions of Styx's first four albums, Styx, Styx II, The Serpent Is Rising, and Man of Miracles, which were released by Wooden Nickel Records. It also includes "Unfinished Song", which was previously released as the B-side to the single "Best Thing" and on the 1980 RCA reissue of Man of Miracles (which was entitled Miracles).

The four albums contained in this compilation (plus Styx's fifth album, Equinox) were recorded with original singer/songwriter/guitarist John Curulewski and feature a harder, eclectic, and more progressive sound when compared to subsequent albums that included Curulewski's replacement, singer/songwriter/guitarist Tommy Shaw.

== Track listing ==
=== Disc one ===
1. "Movement for the Common Man" – 13:11
  - "Children of the Land" (James Young)
  - "Street Collage" (John Ryan)
  - "Fanfare for the Common Man" (Aaron Copland)
  - "Mother Nature's Matinee" (J. Young, Dennis DeYoung)
2. "Right Away" (Paul Frank) – 3:40
3. "What Has Come Between Us" (Mark Gaddis) – 4:53
4. "Best Thing" (D. DeYoung, J. Young) – 3:13
5. "Quick Is the Beat of My Heart" (Lewis Mark) – 3:49
6. "After You Leave Me" (George S. Clinton) – 4:00
7. "You Need Love" (D. DeYoung) – 3:47
8. "Lady" (D. DeYoung) – 2:58
9. "A Day" (John Curulewski) – 8:24
10. "You Better Ask" (J. Curulewski) – 3:55
11. "Little Fugue In 'G'" (Bach) – 1:19
12. "Father O.S. A." (D. DeYoung) – 7:10
13. "Earl of Roseland" (D. DeYoung) – 4:41
14. "I'm Gonna Make You Feel It" (D. DeYoung) – 2:23
15. "Unfinished Song" (D. DeYoung) – 2:59

=== Disc two ===
1. "Witch Wolf" (J. Young) – 3:57
2. "The Grove of Eglantine" (D. DeYoung) – 5:00
3. "Young Man" (J. Young, Rick Young) – 4:45
4. "As Bad As This" (including hidden track "Plexiglas Toilet") – 6:10
5. "Winner Take All" – 3:10
  (The track listing on the back of this CD set erroneously lists this song as "Winner Takes All")
6. "22 Years" – 3:39
7. "Jonas Psalter" – 4:41
8. "The Serpent Is Rising" – 4:55
9. "Krakatoa" – 1:36
10. "Hallelujah Chorus" – 2:14
11. "Rock & Roll Feeling" – 3:02
12. "Havin' a Ball" – 3:53
13. "Golden Lark" – 3:23
14. "A Song for Suzanne" – 5:15
15. "A Man Like Me" – 2:57
16. "Lies" (Beau Charles/Buddy Randell) – 2:41
17. "Evil Eyes" – 4:02
18. "Southern Woman" – 3:10
19. "Christopher, Mr. Christopher" – 4:02
20. "Man of Miracles" – 4:55

== Personnel ==
- Dennis DeYoung - keyboards, vocals
- James Young - guitar, vocals
- John Curulewski - guitar, keyboards, vocals
- Chuck Panozzo - bass
- John Panozzo - drums
