= Greatest Hits (Styx album) =

Styx album

Styx Greatest Hits

Greatest hits album by Styx
- Released: August 22, 1995
- Recorded: 1975–1995
- Genre: Rock, progressive rock, hard rock, pop rock
- Length: 75:25
- Label: A&M
- Producer: Styx and Dennis DeYoung

Styx compilation chronology
Styx Classics Volume 15 (1987)	Styx Greatest Hits (1995)	Styx Greatest Hits Part 2 (1996)

Professional ratings
Review scores
Source	Rating
Allmusic	4.5/5 stars
The Rolling Stone Album Guide	2.5/5 stars

Greatest Hits is a compilation album and primary Greatest Hits album by the American rock band Styx. It was released by A&M Records on August 22, 1995. It contains 16 tracks, 8 of which were Billboard Top 10 Pop Singles, another 4 that were Billboard Top 40 Pop Singles, and 4 that received heavy airplay on FM album oriented rock stations.

This album essentially replaced Styx's previous greatest hits album, Styx - Classics, Volume 15, which was released by A&M in 1987. That previous album had excluded the hit song "Lady" because the song was originally recorded for and released through Wooden Nickel Records (which also had a distribution arrangement with RCA Records). Because A&M/PolyGram had been unable to secure distribution rights to the song, most of the classic lineup of Styx (Dennis DeYoung, Tommy Shaw, Chuck Panozzo and James "J.Y." Young) reunited to re-record the track at Dennis' home studio, The White Room. They were joined by uncredited session drummer Todd Sucherman, who filled in for John Panozzo due to Panozzo's failing health; Sucherman joined the band permanently in 1996, during the Return to Paradise tour. The track, which is very similar to the original, was titled "Lady '95".

With the exception of "Lady '95", Styx - Greatest Hits features the original album versions of all the other songs included in the compilation. "Come Sail Away" is presented here in its full 6:05 version and "Miss America" is here in its original studio version (despite the CD's packaging showing incorrect time listings for both tracks).

== Aftermath ==
The "Lady '95" session led to Styx reuniting.

== Omitted Hits ==
While the Greatest Hits album arguably captured most of the biggest Styx pop and rock radio singles, there were some noticeable omissions, some which would appear on the follow-up Styx Greatest Hits Part 2. Songs that charted in the top 40 that were not included on Volume 1 include "Love At First Sight (#25)", "Why Me" (#26), "Mademoiselle (#34)," "Music Time (#40)," and "Sing For The Day (#41)." The album also omitted Top Rock Tracks "Rockin' The Paradise (#8)," "Light Up," "Love Is the Ritual (#9), and "Snowblind" (#22)." Many of these songs found their way into Volume 2, but "Why Me," "Music Time," and "Love Is the Ritual" were not included in either version.

== Track listing ==
No.	Title	Writer(s)	Original album	Length
1.	"Lady '95" (re-recorded for the compilation)	Dennis DeYoung	Originally from Styx II, 1973	3:05
2.	"The Best of Times"	DeYoung	Paradise Theatre, 1981	4:18
3.	"Lorelei"	DeYoung, James Young	Equinox, 1975	3:22
4.	"Too Much Time on My Hands"	Tommy Shaw	Paradise Theatre, 1981	4:33
5.	"Babe"	DeYoung	Cornerstone, 1979	4:24
6.	"Fooling Yourself (The Angry Young Man)"	Shaw	The Grand Illusion, 1977	5:28
7.	"Show Me the Way"	DeYoung	Edge of the Century, 1990	4:36
8.	"Renegade"	Shaw	Pieces of Eight, 1978	4:14
9.	"Come Sail Away" (erroneously listed as 5:30 on label)	DeYoung	The Grand Illusion, 1977	6:05
10.	"Blue Collar Man (Long Nights)"	Shaw	Pieces of Eight, 1978	4:06
11.	"The Grand Illusion"	DeYoung	The Grand Illusion, 1977	4:35
12.	"Crystal Ball"	Shaw	Crystal Ball, 1976	4:32
13.	"Suite Madame Blue"	DeYoung	Equinox, 1975	6:33
14.	"Miss America" (erroneously listed as 6:23 on label)	Young	The Grand Illusion, 1977	5:02
15.	"Mr. Roboto"	DeYoung	Kilroy Was Here, 1983	5:30
16.	"Don't Let It End"	DeYoung	Kilroy Was Here, 1983	4:54

== Personnel ==
- Dennis DeYoung - vocals, keyboards
- Tommy Shaw - guitar, vocals
- James "J.Y". Young - guitar, vocals
- Chuck Panozzo - bass
- John Panozzo - drums
- John Curulewski - guitar on "Lorelei" and "Suite Madame Blue"
- Glen Burtnik - guitar on "Show Me the Way"
- Todd Sucherman - drums on "Lady '95" (uncredited)

== Charts ==
Chart (1995)	Peak position
US Billboard 200	138

== Certifications ==
Region	Certification	Certified units/sales
United States (RIAA)	Platinum	1,000,000^{^}
^{^} Shipments figures based on certification alone.
