= Styx Classics Volume 15 =

Styx - Classics, Volume 15

Greatest hits album by Styx
- Released: 1987
- Genre: Rock/Pop
- Length: 68:49
- Label: A&M
- Producer: Styx

Styx compilation chronology
Best of Styx (1977)	Styx - Classics, Volume 15 (1987)	Styx Greatest Hits (1995)

Professional ratings
Review scores
Source	Rating
Allmusic	4.5/5 stars

Styx - Classics, Volume 15 is a greatest hits compilation for the band Styx, released in 1987 by A&M Records as part of A&M's classics series of greatest hits albums for artists on its label.

Like Best of Styx, this compilation is label-exclusive. Therefore, it only contains Styx's hits on the A&M label—which necessarily excludes Styx's significant hit "Lady", which was recorded for Wooden Nickel Records. Of note, the version of "Come Sail Away" on the album is an abbreviated edit with an early fade, and the version of "Miss America" is a live performance of the song.

== Track listing ==
1. "Babe" (D. DeYoung) – 4:28
2. "Blue Collar Man (Long Nights)" (T. Shaw) – 4:07
3. "Come Sail Away" (Early fade-out) (D. DeYoung) – 5:32
4. "Crystal Ball" (T. Shaw) – 4:32
5. "Fooling Yourself (The Angry Young Man)" (Early fade-out) (T. Shaw) – 5:10
6. "Light Up" (D. DeYoung) – 4:21
7. "Mr. Roboto" (D. DeYoung) – 5:29
8. "Renegade" (T. Shaw) – 4:15
9. "The Best of Times" (D. DeYoung) – 4:19
10. "Don't Let It End" (D. DeYoung) – 4:57
11. "The Grand Illusion" (D. DeYoung) – 4:37
12. "Suite Madame Blue" (D. DeYoung) – 6:33
13. "Too Much Time on My Hands" (T. Shaw) – 4:33
14. "Miss America" (Live) (J. Young) – 6:23

== Personnel ==
- Dennis DeYoung - keyboards, vocals
- Tommy Shaw - guitar, mandolin, vocals
- James Young - guitar, vocals
- John Curulewski - guitar, vocals
- Chuck Panozzo - bass, vocals
- John Panozzo - drums

== Certifications ==
Region	Certification	Certified units/sales
United States (RIAA)	Gold	500,000^{^}
^{^} Shipments figures based on certification alone.
