= Best of Styx =

Compilation album by Styx
- Released: 1977
- Recorded: 1971–1974
- Genre: Progressive rock
- Length: 39:08
- Label: Wooden Nickel

Styx chronology
The Grand Illusion (1977)	Best of Styx (1977)	Pieces of Eight (1978)

Styx compilation chronology
Best of Styx (1977)	Styx Classics Volume 15 (1987)

Alternate Album Cover
- Cover of 1979 reissue

Professional ratings
Review scores
Source	Rating
AllMusic	3/5 stars
The Rolling Stone Album Guide	1/5 stars

Best of Styx is a compilation album by the American rock band Styx, released in 1977 on Wooden Nickel Records, the band's previous record label. The label released it after the success of Styx's seventh studio album, The Grand Illusion, and contains selected Styx songs in the Wooden Nickel catalog.

Styx had left Wooden Nickel to sign with A&M Records several years earlier, so the compilation does not contain any songs from Styx's three A&M albums that preceded this album's release. "Lady", "You Need Love" and "Best Thing" are the principal songs that could be classified as hits in this collection, having charted at numbers 6, 88 and 82 on the Billboard Hot 100, respectively; the remainder of the songs are selected album tracks from Styx's Wooden Nickel releases.

RCA Records reissued the album with new artwork in 1979; this artwork has been used for all subsequent reissues, including CD editions.

In 1980, Wooden Nickel released the compilation Lady, containing the same tracks as this set (in a different running order), minus the song "Winner Take All".

== Track listing ==
Side one
No.	Title	Writer(s)	Length
1.	"You Need Love"	Dennis DeYoung	3:44
2.	"Lady"	DeYoung	2:56
3.	"I'm Gonna Make You Feel It"	DeYoung	2:23
4.	"What Has Come Between Us"	Mark Gaddis	4:53
5.	"Southern Woman"	James Young, Ray Brandle	3:10
6.	"Rock & Roll Feeling"	Young, John Curulewski	3:02

Side two
No.	Title	Writer(s)	Length
7.	"Winner Take All"	DeYoung, Chuck Lofrano	3:10
8.	"Best Thing"	DeYoung, Young	3:13
9.	"Witch Wolf"	Young, Brandle	3:57
10.	"The Grove of Eglantine"	DeYoung	5:00
11.	"Man of Miracles"	Young, DeYoung, Brandle	4:55
Total length:			39:08

== Personnel ==
- Dennis DeYoung - keyboards, vocals
- James Young - guitar, vocals
- John Curulewski - guitar, keyboards, vocals
- Chuck Panozzo - bass
- John Panozzo - drums

== Certifications ==
Region	Certification	Certified units/sales
Canada (Music Canada)	Platinum	100,000^{^}
United States (RIAA)	Gold	500,000^{^}
^{^} Shipments figures based on certification alone.
