= Styx (album) =

Studio album by Styx
- Released: August 31, 1972
- Recorded: 1972
- Studios: Paragon, Chicago
- Genres: Progressive rock; hard rock
- Length: 32:36
- Label: Wooden Nickel
- Producers: John Ryan, Bill Traut

Styx chronology
Styx (1972)	Styx II (1973)

Singles from Styx
- 1. "Best Thing" Released: July 1972

Professional ratings
Review scores
Source	Rating
AllMusic	2/5 stars
The Rolling Stone Album Guide	1/5 stars

Styx is the debut studio album by the American rock band Styx. It was released in 1972.

== Background ==
The band started as a cover band that played weddings and birthday parties. They called themselves The Tradewinds in 1961, when the band was composed of 12-year-old fraternal twins Chuck and John Panozzo, who played bass guitar and drums, respectively, and their neighbor, 14-year-old Dennis DeYoung on keyboards, accordion, and vocals. They later named themselves TW4, after adding their college friend John Curulewski in 1968, and the South Side hard rocker James "J.Y." Young in 1970, as guitarists, songwriters, and singers.

Their debut album showcases them as a progressive-art rock/'60s garage rock act. The album's centerpiece is the 13-minute opus "Movement for the Common Man," a four-part suite. It opens with "Children of the Land," a J.Y.-led rocker featuring a potent percussion solo by John Panozzo, which flows seamlessly into "Street Collage"— a section built from ambient urban soundscapes of Chicago. From there, the band delivers a symphonic rock interpretation of Aaron Copland's composition "Fanfare for the Common Man," before concluding with "Mother Nature's Matinee," a prog-folk track co-written by James Young and Dennis DeYoung. The upbeat pop rocker "Best Thing" also co-written by Young and DeYoung, was released as a single in late '72, and peaked at No. 82 on the Billboard Hot 100 charts for that year.

The remaining songs on the album were cover versions that the record label suggested. The band members, including DeYoung, said that they had never heard of them before, but their version of George S. Clinton's "After You Leave Me" is described as a "suitably open-throttled ending to Styx' commendable introductory affair".

The album was reissued in 1979 under the title Styx I with new artwork. In late 2012, it was re-released for CD and digital download, along with Styx II (1973), The Serpent Is Rising (1973), and Man of Miracles (1974).

== Track listing ==
Side one
No.	Title	Writer(s)	Lead vocals/Lead guitar	Length
1.	"Movement for the Common Man": a. "Children of the Land" (writer and vocals: James Young) (5:16); b. "Street Collage" (writer: John Ryan) (1:55); c. "Fanfare for the Common Man" (writer: Aaron Copland, vocals: Young) (2:58); d. "Mother Nature's Matinee" (co-writer and vocals: Dennis DeYoung) (3:02)			13:11
2.	"Right Away"	Paul Frank	Young	3:40

Side two
No.	Title	Writer(s)	Lead vocals/Lead guitar	Length
3.	"What Has Come Between Us"	Mark Gaddis	DeYoung	4:53
4.	"Best Thing"	Young, DeYoung	DeYoung, Young	3:13
5.	"Quick Is the Beat of My Heart"	Lewis Mark	Young	3:49
6.	"After You Leave Me"	George S. Clinton	Young	4:00

== Personnel ==
=== Styx ===
- Dennis DeYoung – vocals, keyboards
- James "J.Y." Young – vocals, electric guitars
- John Curulewski – vocals, electric and acoustic guitars
- Chuck Panozzo – bass guitar
- John Panozzo – drums, percussion

=== Production ===
- Producers – John Ryan, Bill Traut
- Engineers – Marty Feldman, Barry Mraz
- Mixing – Barry Mraz, John Ryan

== Charts ==
Singles - Billboard (United States)

Year	Single	Chart	Position
1972	"Best Thing"	Pop Singles	82
