= Styx II =

Studio album by Styx
- Released: July 1973
- Recorded: 1972–73
- Venue: "Little Fugue in G" at St. James Cathedral, Chicago
- Studio: Paragon, Chicago
- Genre: Progressive rock; hard rock
- Length: 34:20
- Label: Wooden Nickel
- Producer: John Ryan, Bill Traut (exec.)

Styx chronology
Styx (1972)	Styx II (1973)	The Serpent Is Rising (1973)

Singles from Styx II
- 1. "Lady" Released: September 1973; 2. "You Need Love" Released: May 1975

Professional ratings
Review scores
Source	Rating
AllMusic	3/5 stars
The Rolling Stone Album Guide	1/5 stars

Styx II is the second studio album by the American rock band Styx, released in July 1973.

== Background ==
After releasing their debut album, which consists mostly of cover songs, the band intended to write some strong original new material; Dennis DeYoung was particularly in favor of this. DeYoung had written a song by himself on an electric piano in the band's garage, and had originally intended for it to be on the first album. He later decided to play it on an acoustic piano. However, Bill Traut wanted to save it for the second album. The result was "Lady", written about DeYoung's wife Suzanne.

"Lady" was not a hit upon its original release in 1973. However, after the band released their fourth album Man of Miracles in 1974, they went to WLS, the most powerful Chicago radio station at the time, and convinced the program director (Jim Smith) to replay this song. It wound up being played frequently on the air in Chicago. In May 1975, the song broke out nationally, eventually peaking at no. 6 on the Billboard charts.

Besides "Lady," the album contains some upbeat and prog rock songs, such as the rockers "You Need Love" and "I'm Gonna Make You Feel It," which were written by DeYoung and sung by James "JY" Young.

This is also the first album on which John Curulewski wrote and sang on two songs: the proggish, jazzy "A Day," which has an unusual sound for the band, and the boogie humor song "You Better Ask," whose outro features a snippet of "Strangers in the Night" on calliope organ and an evil laugh.

Side 2 opens with a DeYoung rendition of "Little Fugue in G" by Bach, played on pipe organ at a Chicago Cathedral, and segues into the mellow prog rocker "Father O.S.A."

The rocker "Earl of Roseland" was written by DeYoung based on early memories from when he grew up in Chicago's Roseland neighborhood, where he had formed the band with the Panozzo brothers.

After Styx moved to A&M Records and achieved national success in the US, Styx II went Gold shortly before the success of The Grand Illusion (1977) and became the only big-selling album from the Wooden Nickel era, because of "Lady". The album was reissued in 1980 by Wooden Nickel under the title Lady. The reissue has new artwork and should not be confused with a Styx compilation album that was later released with the same name. Until the release of Crash of the Crown in 2021, it was the only Styx album to not feature material written or co-written by Young (apart from their covers 2005 album, Big Bang Theory).

== Track listing ==
All tracks are written by Dennis DeYoung, except where noted.

Side one: Heads
No.	Title	Writer(s)	Lead vocals	Length
1.	"You Need Love"		Young	3:44
2.	"Lady"		DeYoung	2:56
3.	"A Day"	John Curulewski	Curulewski	8:19
4.	"You Better Ask"	Curulewski	Curulewski	3:54

Side two: Tails
No.	Title	Writer(s)	Lead vocals	Length
5.	"Little Fugue in G"	Johann Sebastian Bach	(instrumental)	1:17
6.	"Father O.S.A."		DeYoung	7:08
7.	"Earl of Roseland"		DeYoung	4:39
8.	"I'm Gonna Make You Feel It"		Young	2:23

== Personnel ==
=== Styx ===
- Dennis DeYoung – vocals, keyboards
- James "JY" Young – vocals, guitars
- John Curulewski – vocals, guitars, keyboards
- Chuck Panozzo – bass
- John Panozzo – drums, percussion

=== Production ===
- Produced by John Ryan
- Executive producer: Bill Traut
- Engineers: Marty Feldman, Barry Mraz

== Charts ==
Chart (1975)	Peak position
US Billboard 200	20

== Certifications ==
Region	Certification	Certified units/sales
United States (RIAA)	Gold	500,000^{^}
^{^} Shipments figures based on certification alone.
