= Best Thing =

Single by Styx

from the album Styx
- Released: July 1972 (US)
- Genre: Progressive rock
- Length: 3:13
- Label: Wooden Nickel Records
- Songwriters: Dennis DeYoung, James Young

Styx singles chronology
"Best Thing" (1972)	"Lady" (1973)

"Best Thing" is the first single released by the band Styx from their self-titled debut album, Styx (1972). It charted at #82 on the Billboard Hot 100.

Cash Box said that "high vocal harmonies and tight, rocky organ and lead guitar work accentuate this dynamic, searing track." Record World said that "strong percussion and organ riffs highlight this heavy rocker" and that it has "good harmonies, too."

The song was also included on the 1979 US reissue of the band's fourth album, Man of Miracles

== Personnel ==
- Dennis DeYoung – lead vocals (first and last verses), backing vocals, keyboards
- James Young – lead guitar, lead vocals (middle verses, bridge), backing vocals
- John Curulewski – rhythm guitar, backing vocals
- Chuck Panozzo – bass
- John Panozzo – drums

== Charts ==
Chart (1972)	Peak position
US Billboard Hot 100	82
