= Man of Miracles =

Studio album by Styx
- Released: October 1974
- Recorded: 1974
- Studio: Golden Voice Studios, South Pekin, IL
- Genre: Progressive rock; hard rock
- Length: 37:20
- Label: Wooden Nickel
- Producer: John Ryan, Bill Traut

Styx chronology
The Serpent Is Rising (1973)	Man of Miracles (1974)	Equinox (1975)

Professional ratings
Review scores
Source	Rating
AllMusic	2.5/5 stars
The Rolling Stone Album Guide	1/5 stars

Man of Miracles is the fourth studio album by the American rock band Styx, released in October 1974. It entered the Billboard Album charts on November 9, where it reached No. 154.

This would be the band's last original album on the independent Chicago-based label Wooden Nickel Records before moving to the major label A&M.

== Background ==
The album had a diverse sound, it showcased the style of two band members and a pre-commercial sound: James "JY" Young songs were more straight ahead hard rockers, while Dennis DeYoung songs were more mellow ballads, classical, and prog rock songs.

The original issue contained the catchy upbeat cover of "Lies" by The Knickerbockers in 1965. A second release of Man of Miracles substituted this with "Best Thing", a song also contained on the first Styx album from 1972, as the opening track on side two. The album was again reissued in 1980 with new artwork and a newly abbreviated title, Miracles. This version started the second side with the ballad "Unfinished Song", which is sung by Dennis DeYoung.

== Artwork ==
The cover art was designed by Leon Rosenblatt, whose name is printed on the back credits as "Lee Rosenblatt." The initials "LJR" are plainly visible in the wizard's beard, and were likely hidden there by the album's artist, Leon J. Rosenblatt.

== Track listing ==
Side one
No.	Title	Writer(s)	Lead vocals Lead guitar	Length
1.	"Rock & Roll Feeling"	James Young, John Curulewski	Young	3:02
2.	"Havin' a Ball"	Curulewski, Young	Young	3:53
3.	"Golden Lark"	Dennis DeYoung	DeYoung	3:23
4.	"A Song for Suzanne"	DeYoung	DeYoung	5:15
5.	"A Man Like Me"	Young	Young	2:57

Side two
No.	Title	Writer(s)	Lead vocals	Length
6.	"Lies"	Buddy Randell, Beau Charles	DeYoung	2:41
7.	"Evil Eyes"	DeYoung	DeYoung	4:02
8.	"Southern Woman"	Young, Ray Brandle	Young	3:10
9.	"Christopher, Mr. Christopher"	DeYoung	DeYoung	4:02
10.	"Man of Miracles"	Young, DeYoung, Brandle	Young	4:55

== Personnel ==
=== Styx ===
- Dennis DeYoung – vocals, keyboards
- James "JY" Young – vocals, guitars
- John Curulewski – vocals, guitars, synthesizers
- Chuck Panozzo – bass
- John Panozzo – drums, percussion

=== Production ===
- Producer: John Ryan for Chicago Kid Productions
- Engineer: Gary Loizzo

== Charts ==
Chart (1974)	Peak position
US Billboard 200	154
