= You Need Love (Styx song) =

Single by Styx

from the album Styx II
- B-side: "You Better Ask"
- Released: 2 May 1975
- Recorded: 1972
- Genre: Rock
- Length: 3:47
- Label: Wooden Nickel
- Songwriter: James Young
- Producer: John Ryan

Styx singles chronology
"Lady" (1973)	"You Need Love" (1975)	"Lorelei" (1976)

"You Need Love" is a song by Styx written by James Young. Following the success of the 1974 re-release of the single "Lady" from the album Styx II, "You Need Love" from that album was released as a follow-up single.

Cash Box said "with a dynamite synthesizer-guitar-rhythm-vocal intro leading the way, Styx explodes with lightning-quick guitar work and a slick pace that breaks it all up" and praised the guitar solos and organ passage. Record World said that "Guitar virtuosity melds with [Styx'] brilliant vocal harmonies, adding further excitement to their burgeoning career."

== Personnel ==
- James Young: lead vocals, lead guitar
- Dennis DeYoung: keyboards, backing vocals
- John Curulewski: rhythm guitar, backing vocals
- Chuck Panozzo: bass guitar
- John Panozzo: drums

== Charts ==
Chart (1975)	Peak position
US Billboard Hot 100	88
