= The Serpent Is Rising =

Studio album by Styx
- Released: October 1, 1973
- Recorded: 1973
- Studios: Paragon, Chicago; St. James Cathedral, Chicago
- Genres: Progressive rock; hard rock
- Length: 40:07
- Label: Wooden Nickel
- Producers: Styx, Barry Mraz

Styx chronology
| Styx II (1973) | The Serpent Is Rising (1973) | Man of Miracles (1974) |

Singles from The Serpent Is Rising
- 1. "Winner Takes All" Released: 1973

Professional ratings
Review scores
| Source | Rating |
|---|---|
| AllMusic | 2/5 stars |
| The Rolling Stone Album Guide | 1/5 stars |

The Serpent Is Rising is the third studio album by the American rock band Styx, released in October 1973, three months after their previous album Styx II was released in July 1973.

The album was reissued in 1980 with new artwork and a new title, Serpent.

The album peaked at #192 on the Billboard 200, their second-lowest charting album, and as of 2007 had sold fewer than 100,000 copies worldwide.

== Songs and reception ==
Described as a loose concept album, The Serpent Is Rising contains a number of sexual innuendos. The baroque prog "The Grove of Eglantine" (written by DeYoung) was about a woman's vagina. It has some harpsichord and accordion, to give a British/European sound.

The proggish title track was written by John Curulewski, is about the serpent beginning to rise. Musically, it has some King Crimson influence.

The screaming spoken word "Krakatoa" by Curulewski was named for the volcano event of the same name in 1883. It features an ending glissando which was taken from a 1970 Beaver and Krause track called "Spaced", for which they were credited on the album.

The acoustic bluesy track "As Bad as This" by Curulewski has a hidden track called "Don't Sit Down on the Plexiglas Toilet" which is a calypso humor about a boy who is sitting on a Plexiglas toilet and having problems. The track only features Curulewski and the Panozzo brothers. The song was played on the Dr. Demento radio show and "Weird Al" Yankovic supposedly loved it.

The album also includes James Young rockers "Witch Wolf" and "Young Man", the upbeat "Winner Take All" (written by DeYoung and sung by Young) and the boogie-woogie track "22 Years" (written by Curulewski but sung as a duet by DeYoung and Young). The outro for the latter track features the producer and president of Wooden Nickel records Bill Traut on saxophone.

The prog rocker "Jonas Psalter" was written by DeYoung and sung by Young. Lyrically, it was about pirates. Musically, it has elements of the contemporary sound of Yes, and also featured a Moog synthesizer.

The album finished with Handel's Hallelujah classical piece, features all the band members singing. DeYoung played a pipe organ in a Chicago cathedral for the piece.

Styx considers The Serpent Is Rising to be their worst recording. Dennis DeYoung is indirectly quoted as saying it was "one of the worst recorded and produced in the history of music."

== Track listing ==
Side one
| No. | Title | Writer(s) | Lead vocals/Lead guitar | Length |
|---|---|---|---|---|
| 1. | "Witch Wolf" | James Young, Ray Brandle | J. Young | 3:57 |
| 2. | "The Grove of Eglantine" | Dennis DeYoung | DeYoung | 5:00 |
| 3. | "Young Man" | J. Young, Richard Young | J. Young | 4:45 |
| 4. | "As Bad as This" (3:45) / "Plexiglas Toilet" (hidden track) (2:22) | John Curulewski | Curulewski | 6:10 |

Side two
| No. | Title | Writer(s) | Lead vocals/Lead guitar | Length |
|---|---|---|---|---|
| 1. | "Winner Take All" | DeYoung, Charles Lofrano | J. Young | 3:10 |
| 2. | "22 Years" | Curulewski | DeYoung, J. Young/J. Young | 3:39 |
| 3. | "Jonas Psalter" | DeYoung | J. Young | 4:41 |
| 4. | "The Serpent Is Rising" | Curulewski, Lofrano | Curulewski | 4:55 |
| 5. | "Krakatoa" | Curulewski, Paul Beaver, Bernard L. Krause | Curulewski | 1:36 |
| 6. | "Hallelujah Chorus" (from George Frideric Handel's Messiah) | Handel | DeYoung, J. Young, Curulewski, C. Panozzo, J. Panozzo | 2:14 |

== Personnel ==
=== Styx ===
- Dennis DeYoung – vocals, keyboards, accordion
- James "JY" Young – vocals, guitars
- John Curulewski – vocals, guitars, keyboards
- Chuck Panozzo – bass, backing vocals on "Hallelujah Chorus"
- John Panozzo – drums, percussion, backing vocals on "Hallelujah Chorus"

=== Additional personnel ===
- Bill Traut – saxophone on "22 Years"

=== Production ===
- Producers: Styx, Barry Mraz
- Engineer: Barry Mraz
- Cover art: Dennis Pohl

== Charts ==
| Chart (1974) | Peak position |
|---|---|
| US Billboard 200 | 192 |
