= Lorelei (Styx song) =

Single by Styx

from the album Equinox
- B-side: "Midnight Ride"
- Released: February 1976 (US)
- Recorded: 1975
- Studio: Paragon Recording Studios, Chicago
- Genre: Rock; hard rock
- Label: A&M
- Songwriters: Dennis DeYoung; James Young

Styx singles chronology
"You Need Love" (1975)	"Lorelei" (1976)	"Mademoiselle" (1976)

"Lorelei" is a song from rock band Styx. It appeared on their 1975 album Equinox, and it was released as a single in 1976.

== Background ==
The song peaked at number 27 on the United States Billboard Hot 100 in April 1976, and it was the band's second top-40 hit single. "Lorelei" also reached number six on the Canadian charts during the weeks of May 8 and 15 in 1976.

Chicago radio superstation WLS, which gave the song much airplay, ranked "Lorelei" as the 77th most popular hit of 1976. It reached as high as number eight for two weeks on their surveys of April 17 and 24 in 1976.

Record World described the song as "a hard rocking number with overtones of The Who and Raspberries in its fiery rhythms".

"Lorelei" was one of the songs that Styx re-recorded for their Regeneration: Volume 1 EP in 2010, with James Young on lead vocals in this version. It was re-recorded again for the 2023 album Now Playing, a Styx compilation that included both recordings from recent albums and re-recordings of earlier hits. This collection was sold at their concerts, with Lawrence Gowan performing lead vocals on this version.

== Personnel ==
- Dennis DeYoung: lead vocals, keyboards
- James Young: lead guitar, backing vocals
- John Curulewski: rhythm guitar, backing vocals
- Chuck Panozzo: bass
- John Panozzo: drums

== Composition ==
"Lorelei" is written in D-major with a moderately fast rock tempo.

== Charts ==
=== Weekly charts ===
Chart (1976)	Peak position
Canada Top Singles (RPM)	6
US Billboard Hot 100	27

=== Year-end charts ===
Chart (1976)	Peak position
Canada Top Singles (RPM)	77
U.S. (Joel Whitburn's Pop Annual)	163
