= The Grand Illusion =

Studio album by Styx
- Released: July 7, 1977
- Recorded: 1977
- Studios: Paragon, Chicago
- Genres: Progressive rock; hard rock; art rock
- Length: 38:59
- Label: A&M
- Producer: Styx

Styx chronology
Crystal Ball (1977)	The Grand Illusion (1977)	Best of Styx (1977)

Singles from The Grand Illusion
- 1. "Come Sail Away" Released: August 1977; 2. "Fooling Yourself" Released: February 1978

The Grand Illusion is the seventh studio album by the American rock band Styx. Recorded at Paragon Recording Studios in Chicago, the album was released on July 7, 1977, by A&M Records. The release was a smash worldwide, selling three million copies in the US (Triple Platinum) alone. Some estimates have the album at over 6 million copies sold. The album launched the band to stardom and spawned the hit singles "Come Sail Away" and "Fooling Yourself." The title track also received substantial FM airplay and continues to be a mainstay on classic rock radio, but was never released as an official single.

The album cover art is based on Rene Magritte's 1965 painting, "The Blank Signature."

== Background and songs ==
As with much of Styx's catalog, many of the songs have quasi-medieval/fantasy lyrics and themes. Some are allegories and commentaries on contemporary American life and the members' experiences in an American rock band in the late 1970s, such as "Castle Walls," "Superstars," "Miss America" and the title track, which touches on "The Grand Illusion" of fame and fortune and how they are not what they appear.

Classic Rock critic Malcolm Dome rated the title track as Styx’s all-time greatest song. He also rated "Come Sail Away" as the band's 7th greatest song.

Tommy Shaw wrote the acoustic ballad "Man in the Wilderness" after watching the band Kansas perform in Detroit, where Styx had played the opening set. He has called it "Epic! Unlike any presentation of rock music I'd ever experienced. To go that big opened up all kinds of ideas in my mind, and the next time I was alone with my acoustic, the song more or less unfolded itself." The acoustic rocker’s lyrics stem from his experiences of rising to fame with Styx as well as his brother being sent off to fight in the Vietnam War, as a pawn for the strategies of politicians in Washington, D.C.

"Come Sail Away" uses sailing as a metaphor to achieve one's dreams and the yearning to sail away. The lyrics touch on nostalgia of "childhood friends," escapism, and a religious theme symbolized by "a gathering of angels" singing "a song of hope." The ending lyrics explain a transformation from a sailing ship into a starship: "They climbed aboard their starship and headed for the skies," words evoking biblical verses from Ezekiel (1:1-28). However, DeYoung revealed on In the Studio with Redbeard (which devoted an entire episode to the making of The Grand Illusion) that he was depressed when he wrote the track because Styx's first two A&M offerings, Equinox and Crystal Ball, had sold fewer units than expected after the success of the single "Lady." Musically, it combines a plaintive, ballad-like opening section (including piano and synthesizer interludes) with a bombastic, guitar-heavy second half. In the middle of the second half it features a minute-long instrumental break on synthesizer, characteristic of progressive rock, after which the guitar returns with a catchy chorus.

"Fooling Yourself (The Angry Young Man)" was written by Shaw. It was originally based on Shaw's initial perception of DeYoung who was an "angry young man" who viewed the group's successes with a wary eye and grew angry or depressed with every setback. It was only in later years that Shaw began to see himself in the lyrics, and the song took on a more personal meaning to him.

The title track is well known in the classic rock genre, although it was never officially released as a pop single. The closing track, "The Grand Finale," combines the themes of the songs on the album.

== Critical reception ==
Professional ratings
Review scores
Source	Rating
AllMusic	4/5 stars
Classic Rock	4.5/5 stars
The Daily Vault	B− (1998); B (2006)
The Rolling Stone Album Guide	2.5/5 stars
Sputnikmusic	5/5 stars

Rolling Stone critic Joe Fernbacher called "Miss America" "the most dynamic song on the album" but said that it "simply reeks of misogynistic misdirection." The Daily Vault critic Melanie Love called it a "crunchy, hard-edged rocker from guitarist James Young" and said that "the snarling vocals do verge on being laughable, but it's an entertaining track nonetheless." Daily Vault critic Christopher Thelen said that the track "lost little of [its] punch over the years" and has become "even a stronger track as the years go by." Hamish Camp said that it "continues the theme of combining the keyboard ethos of the progressive movement, with the crunching guitar riffs of their more rock-oriented peers."

== Track listing ==
Side one
No.	Title	Writer(s)	Lead vocals	Length
1.	"The Grand Illusion"	DeYoung	DeYoung	4:36
2.	"Fooling Yourself (The Angry Young Man)"	Shaw	Shaw	5:28
3.	"Superstars"	Young, DeYoung, Shaw	Shaw, DeYoung (spoken section)	4:00
4.	"Come Sail Away"	DeYoung	DeYoung	6:07

Side two
No.	Title	Writer(s)	Lead vocals	Length
5.	"Miss America"	Young	Young	5:02
6.	"Man in the Wilderness"	Shaw	Shaw	5:50
7.	"Castle Walls"	DeYoung	DeYoung	6:00
8.	"The Grand Finale"	DeYoung, Young, Shaw	DeYoung	1:57

== Personnel ==
=== Styx ===
- Dennis DeYoung – vocals, keyboards
- James "JY" Young – vocals, guitars, keyboards on "Come Sail Away"
- Tommy Shaw – vocals, guitars
- Chuck Panozzo – bass
- John Panozzo – drums, percussion

=== Production ===
- Barry Mraz – production assistance, engineer
- Rob Kingsland – engineer
- Mastered by Mike Reese at the Mastering Lab, Los Angeles, California
- Roland Young – art direction
- Jim McCrary – photography
- Chuck Beeson – album design
- Kelly and Mouse – album cover painting

== Charts ==
=== Weekly charts ===
Chart (1977–1978)	Peak position
Australia Albums (Kent Music Report)	49
Canada Top Albums/CDs (RPM)	7
Dutch Albums (Album Top 100)	49
Swedish Albums (Sverigetopplistan)	38
US Billboard 200	6

=== Year-end charts ===
Chart (1978)	Position
Canada Top Albums/CDs (RPM)	14
US Billboard 200	7

== Certifications ==
Region	Certification	Certified units/sales
Canada (Music Canada)	Platinum	100,000^{^}
United States (RIAA)	3× Platinum	3,000,000^{^}
^{^} Shipments figures based on certification alone.
