= Equinox (Styx album) =

Studio album by Styx
- Released: December 1, 1975
- Recorded: 1975
- Studios: Paragon, Chicago
- Genres: Progressive rock; hard rock
- Length: 34:32
- Label: A&M
- Producer: Styx

Styx chronology
Man of Miracles (1974)	Equinox (1975)	Crystal Ball (1976)

Singles from Equinox
- 1. "Lorelei" Released: February 1976; 2. "Light Up" Released: July 1976

Professional ratings
Review scores
Source	Rating
AllMusic	2.5/5 stars
The Daily Vault	B
The Rolling Stone Album Guide	1/5 stars

Equinox is the fifth studio album by the American rock band Styx, released in December 1975. The lead single "Lorelei" became Styx's second US Top 40 hit.

The album was the band's first release for A&M Records (with whom they had signed earlier in 1975, after the success of the 1973 single "Lady").

The album marked the final appearance of original Styx guitarist John Curulewski who left the band due to conflicts with the other members and to spend time with his family. Tommy Shaw replaced him.

Although Equinox stalled at number 58, it was certified Gold in 1977 shortly before the release of The Grand Illusion (1977).

Record World called "Light Up" an "uptempo effort" with "clean sound and infectious hooks."

== Track listing ==
Side one
No.	Title	Writer(s)	Lead vocals	Length
1.	"Light Up"	Dennis DeYoung	DeYoung	4:17
2.	"Lorelei"	DeYoung, Young	DeYoung	3:19
3.	"Mother Dear"	John Curulewski, DeYoung	Curulewski, DeYoung	5:25
4.	"Lonely Child"	DeYoung	DeYoung	3:47

Side two
No.	Title	Writer(s)	Lead vocals	Length
5.	"Midnight Ride"	Young	Young	4:17
6.	"Born for Adventure"	DeYoung, Curulewski, Young	DeYoung	5:12
7.	"Prelude 12"	Curulewski	instrumental	1:21
8.	"Suite Madame Blue"	DeYoung	DeYoung	6:30

== Personnel ==
=== Styx ===
- Dennis DeYoung – vocals, keyboards
- James "JY" Young – vocals, guitars
- John Curulewski – vocals, guitars, keyboards
- Chuck Panozzo – bass
- John Panozzo – drums, percussion

=== Production ===
- Producer – Styx
- Engineer – Barry Mraz
- Assistant engineer – Rob Kingsland
- Remixing – Barry Mraz, Styx
- Mastering – Doug Sax
- Production assistant – Barry Mraz
- Design – Chuck Beeson, Junie Osaki
- Art direction – Roland Young
- Photography – Chris Micoine

== Charts ==
Chart (1976)	Peak position
Canada Top Albums/CDs (RPM)	14
US Billboard 200	58

== Certifications ==
Region	Certification	Certified units/sales
Canada (Music Canada)	Platinum	100,000^{^}
United States (RIAA)	Gold	500,000^{^}
^{^} Shipments figures based on certification alone.
