= Come Sail Away =

- US and Dutch vinyl picture sleeve

Single by Styx

from the album The Grand Illusion
- B-side: "Put Me On"
- Released: August 1977 (US)
- Recorded: 1977
- Genre: Progressive pop; arena rock
- Length: 3:10 (Single Version); 6:07 (Album Version); 4:30 (w/o instrumental)
- Label: A&M
- Songwriter: Dennis DeYoung
- Producer: Styx

Styx singles chronology
"Crystal Ball" (1977)	"Come Sail Away" (1977)	"Fooling Yourself (The Angry Young Man)" (1978)

Alternate cover

Music video
- "Styx - Come Sail Away" on YouTube

"Come Sail Away" is a song by American rock group Styx, written and sung by singer and songwriter Dennis DeYoung and featured on the band's seventh album The Grand Illusion (1977). Upon its release as the lead single from the album, "Come Sail Away" peaked at No. 8 in January 1978 on the Billboard Hot 100, and helped The Grand Illusion achieve multi-platinum sales in 1978. It is one of the biggest hits of Styx's career.

== Background ==
DeYoung revealed on In the Studio with Redbeard (which devoted an entire episode to the making of The Grand Illusion), that he was depressed when he wrote the track after Styx's first two A&M offerings, Equinox and Crystal Ball, sold fewer units than expected after the success of the single "Lady".

== Writing ==
Lyrically, the song uses sailing as a metaphor to achieve one's dreams. The lyrics touch on nostalgia of "childhood friends," escapism, and a religious thematic symbolized by "a gathering of angels" singing "a song of hope." The ending lyrics explain a transition from a sailing ship into a starship, by narrating that "they climbed aboard their starship and headed for the skies".

Musically, "Come Sail Away" combines a plaintive, ballad-like opening section (including piano and synthesizer interludes) with a bombastic, guitar-heavy second half. In the middle of the second half of the album version is a minute-long synthesizer-heavy instrumental break.

"Come Sail Away" is in the key of C major.

== Personnel ==
- Dennis DeYoung – lead vocals, piano, synthesizer
- Tommy Shaw – lead guitar, backing vocals
- James Young – rhythm guitar, synthesizer, backing vocals
- Chuck Panozzo – bass
- John Panozzo – drums

== Reception ==
Cash Box said that "a solitary voice introduces the melody to light piano accompaniment" and that then "the pure fury of the drum, guitar and vocal explosion that follows will pleasantly startle expectations." Record World said that "The melody here is most appealing; the message of escape seems just right for the spirit of the seventies."

In the United States, "Come Sail Away" reached No. 8 on Billboard and spent two weeks at No. 9 on Cash Box. The song also peaked at No. 9 in Canada. On superstation WLS-AM in their home city of Chicago, the song spent two weeks at No. 3 and was ranked at No. 26 for the year.

Louder Sound and Billboard ranked "Come Sail Away" at number seven and number one, respectively, on their lists of the 10 greatest Styx songs.

In June 2026, CBS News included the song in its list of the 250 essential American songs of the past 250 years as chosen by a panel of celebrity contributors; it was one of eight suggestions from Neil deGrasse Tyson.

== Charts ==
=== Weekly charts ===
Chart (1977–1978)	Peak position
Canada Top Singles (RPM)	9
Canada Top Singles (CRIA)	14
US Billboard Hot 100	8

=== Year-end charts ===
Chart (1978)	Peak position
Canada Top Singles (RPM)	82
U.S. (Joel Whitburn's Pop Annual)	67
US Billboard Hot 100	56
