= The Best of Times (song) =

Single by Styx

from the album Paradise Theatre
- B-side: "Lights"
- Released: January 1981
- Recorded: 1980
- Length: 4:17
- Label: A&M
- Songwriter: Dennis DeYoung

Styx singles chronology
"Lights" (1980)	"The Best of Times" (1981)	"Too Much Time on My Hands" (1981)

"The Best of Times" is a song by American rock band Styx, released as the first single from their tenth album Paradise Theatre. It reached No. 1 in Canada on the RPM national singles chart, their second chart-topper in that country, and No. 3 on the US Billboard Hot 100 for four weeks in March and April 1981. In the UK, the song peaked at No. 42 on the UK Singles Chart.

Despite the song's success, the song has not been performed live by the band since singer Dennis DeYoung was dismissed in 1999. DeYoung, however, still performs the song regularly on his solo tours. In 2024, Styx played the song live for the first time in over two decades at a show in Halifax.

== Lyrics and music ==
The title "The Best of Times" is somewhat ironic since the lyrics often state that these are the worst of times. But the singer says that he can get consolation, since the chorus states "The best of times are when I’m alone with you.”

Allmusic critic Eduardo Rivadavia described the song as having a "deliberate, marching rhythm." The basic melody line for "The Best of Times" is used in two other places on the album: As a bold greeting to the listener in "A.D. 1928", and a softer, more subdued version for the farewell track, "A.D. 1958".

DeYoung wrote "The Best of Times" to be the centerpiece of the Paradise Theater album, whose theme was inspired by the 1980 United States presidential election between Ronald Reagan and Jimmy Carter and the fear that Americans were feeling at the time. Snippets of the melody are heard at the beginning and end of the album.

DeYoung said of writing the song:

"The Best Of Times" came to me, lyrically, because I was trying to understand what it is that allows me to weather the changes in the world and in our country. And I decided, "Well, love is a good thing." If you have somebody that you trust to have your back and you have theirs, this is fundamentally a good thing. The character in the song finds solace by going inside, locking the door, pulling the shades down, and being in the embrace of someone he trusts and loves.

DeYoung said of Tommy Shaw's guitar solo:

Some guitarists have their bag of tricks and they whip it out. But Tommy is a stream of consciousness guy. You tell him, "Play another solo, I didn’t like that as well." He would say, "I’ll play something different," and he’d go out there and play two, three, four different solos. And then we had this little box we used to switch between tracks seamlessly. So that solo was pieced together by JY and Tommy and me.

== Reception ==
Record World said that the song illustrates DeYoung's growth as a singer and songwriter and that "A triumphant chorus hook proclamation is hitbound."

Rivadavia called "The Best of Times" "one of the more improbable Top Ten hits of the decade," adding that "somehow it just works."

== Personnel ==
- Dennis DeYoung - lead vocals, keyboards
- Tommy Shaw - lead guitar, vocoder, backing vocals
- James Young - rhythm guitar, backing vocals
- Chuck Panozzo - bass
- John Panozzo - drums

== Charts ==
=== Weekly charts ===
Chart (1981)	Peak position
Australia (Kent Music Report)	23
Germany (GfK)	52
New Zealand (Recorded Music NZ)	26
UK Singles (OCC)	42
U.S. (Billboard Hot 100)	3
U.S. Rock Hits (Billboard Mainstream Rock Airplay)	3
Zimbabwe (ZIMA)	14

=== Year-end charts ===
Year-end chart (1981)	Rank
US Top Pop Singles (Billboard)	30
