= Babe (Styx song) =

1979 single by Styx

Single by Styx

from the album Cornerstone
- B-side: "I'm O.K."
- Released: September 14, 1979
- Recorded: 1979
- Genre: Soft rock
- Length: 4:01 (single version); 4:25 (album version)
- Label: A&M
- Songwriter: Dennis DeYoung
- Producers: Dennis DeYoung; John Panozzo; Chuck Panozzo

Styx singles chronology
"Renegade" (1979)	"Babe" (1979)	"Why Me" (1980)

Music video
- "Babe" by Styx on YouTube

"Babe" is a song by the American rock band Styx. It was the lead single from the band's 1979 double-platinum album Cornerstone. The song was Styx's first, and only, US number-one single, spending two weeks at No. 1 in December 1979, serving as the penultimate number-one single of the 1970s (the ultimate number-one single of the '70s was Escape (The Piña Colada Song), by Rupert Holmes). "Babe" also went to No. 9 on the Adult Contemporary chart. It additionally held the number-one spot for six weeks on the Canadian RPM national singles chart, charting in December 1979 and becoming the opening chart-topper of the 1980s. It was also the band's only UK Top 40 hit, peaking at No. 6. It also reached No. 1 in South Africa.

== Background and content ==
The song was written by member Dennis DeYoung as a birthday present for his wife Suzanne. The theme of the song is "the separation of two people." DeYoung stated of it that "If they've figured out what's more important than a relationship between two people, I don't know what it is." The finished track was the demo with just DeYoung and Styx members John Panozzo and Chuck Panozzo playing on the track, and DeYoung singing all of the harmonies himself. He played a Fender Rhodes electric piano on the track because it was the only keyboard instrument available in the studio, having been left behind by a musician named Bobby Whiteside after recording a session there.

The song was not originally intended to be a Styx track, but Styx members James "J.Y." Young and Tommy Shaw convinced DeYoung to put the song on Cornerstone. As a result, DeYoung's demo was placed on Cornerstone with Shaw overdubbing a guitar solo in the song's middle section.

== Reception ==
Cash Box said it has "crystalline singing and airy electric piano leads" but that the "high harmonies are the highlight." Billboard called it a "melodic pop number" that should break the band into adult contemporary playlists. Record World highlighted the "playful keyboards", "youthful lead vocal", "full harmony chorus and ascending lead guitar runs."

Eric Hegedus of The Morning Call considered it one of the best examples of Styx's "newfound mastery of the techniques needed to perform slow love songs" and highlighted the "deceptively simple lyrics." Rolling Stone critic David Fricke described it as a lush ballad.

The track became a major hit, reaching No. 1 on the US Billboard Hot 100, and was their only major UK hit single, reaching No. 6. The song also won a People's Choice Award as the best song in 1980.

== In popular culture ==
In 1999, "Babe" was included in the soundtrack to the film Big Daddy, starring Adam Sandler, whose character is a huge fan of Styx.

== Personnel ==
- Dennis DeYoung – lead vocals, backing vocals, Fender Rhodes electric piano, synthesizer
- Tommy Shaw – lead guitar
- Chuck Panozzo – bass
- John Panozzo – drums

== Charts ==
=== Weekly charts ===
Chart (1979–1980)	Peak position
Australian Singles (Kent Music Report)	3
Belgium (Ultratop 50 Flanders)	18
Canada Top Singles (RPM)	1
Canada Adult Contemporary (RPM)	1
Ireland (IRMA)	4
Netherlands (Single Top 100)	11
New Zealand (Recorded Music NZ)	3
South Africa (Springbok Radio)	1
UK Singles (Official Charts)	6
US Billboard Hot 100	1
US Adult Contemporary (Billboard)	9
US Cash Box Top 100	1
Zimbabwe (ZIMA)	2

=== Year-end charts ===
Chart (1979)	Peak position
Australian Singles (Kent Music Report)	95
Canada Top Singles (RPM)	41
US Cash Box Top 100	30

Chart (1980)	Peak position
Australian Singles (Kent Music Report)	48
Canada Top Singles (RPM)	39
South Africa (Springbok)	18
US Billboard Hot 100	20

=== All-time charts ===
Chart (1958–2018)	Peak position
US Billboard Hot 100	408

== Certifications ==
Region	Certification	Certified units/sales
Canada (Music Canada)	Gold	75,000^{^}
United Kingdom (BPI)	Silver	250,000^{^}
United States (RIAA)	Gold	1,000,000^{^}
^{^} Shipments figures based on certification alone.

== Caught in the Act version ==
"Babe"

Single by Caught in the Act

from the album Vibe
- Released: July 28, 1997
- Recorded: 1997
- Genre: Pop
- Length: 4:28 (single version); 4:27 (album version)
- Label: ZYX
- Songwriter: Dennis DeYoung
- Producers: Phil Harding, Ian Curnow

Caught in the Act singles chronology
"Do It For Love" (1997)	"Babe" (1997)	"Baby Come Back" (1998)

In 1997 Dutch boy band Caught in the Act covered "Babe" on their album Vibe. The song was moderately successful.

=== Music video ===
In the music video, the band members play soldiers and perform the song both in a barracks and on patrol. They take a look at a waitress.

=== Track listing ===
CD maxi

1. "Babe" (Radio Mix) – 4:28
2. "Babe" (Cloud 9 Mix) – 4:25
3. "Babe" (Gee Extended Mix) – 6:42
4. "Don't Just Leave Me Now" (Radio Version) – 4:46

=== Charts ===
Chart (1997)	Peak position
Austria (Ö3 Austria Top 40)	26
Germany (GfK)	35
Netherlands (Single Top 100)	95
