= Bill Traut =

- Born: William Raymond Traut; March 20, 1929
- Origin: United States
- Died: June 5, 2014 (aged 85) California, U.S.
- Genres: Jazz; rock
- Occupations: Musician; producer; manager; record label executive
- Instrument: Saxophone
- Years active: 1960s
- Labels: Dunwich; Wooden Nickel Records

William Raymond Traut (March 20, 1929 – June 5, 2014) was an American jazz musician, rock music producer, manager, and record label executive. He co-founded the Dunwich and Wooden Nickel record labels and produced the Shadows of Knight, the American Breed, the Siegel–Schwall Band, and Styx, among others.

== Biography ==
Traut began his career in music as a jazz saxophonist, playing with local bands in and around Chicago in the late 1940s and 1950s. He graduated in law from the University of Wisconsin and played regularly with pianist Eddie Higgins. In the early 1960s, both began working for the Seeburg Corporation, producing background music. After teaming up with George Badonsky, who worked for Atlantic Records, they left Seeburg and established their own record label, initially called Amboy (after Badonsky's hometown), and then formed Dunwich Productions, named for the setting of the H. P. Lovecraft story "The Dunwich Horror". They approached Nesuhi Ertegun at Atlantic, who allowed Traut and Badonsky to produce Higgins's 1965 album Soulero. Traut also wrote the tune "Shelley's World", recorded by Oscar Peterson.

Traut and Badonsky then discovered Chicago teen band the Shadows of Knight, and had them record a "cleaned-up" version of "Gloria", written and first recorded by Van Morrison and his band Them. The Shadows of Knight version, released on Traut and Badonsky's Dunwich label, reached the U.S. top ten in early 1966. In early 1967, Traut and Badonsky broke their ties with Higgins and closed the Dunwich label, while retaining the production company, and began working with other Chicago bands, notably psychedelic rock band H. P. Lovecraft (named after the author), and the American Breed. Traut was responsible for producing the American Breed's hit singles, including "Step out of Your Mind" and "Bend Me, Shape Me", both in 1967. The following year, Badonsky left Dunwich (becoming a successful restaurateur) and Traut, as head of the company, recruited producers Jim Golden and Bob Monaco to work with bands including the Cryan' Shames, Aorta, Coven, and the Siegel–Schwall Band.

In 1971, Traut established the Wooden Nickel record label with Jim Golden and Jerry Weintraub, signing the Siegel–Schwall Band and TW4, who later became Styx. In the late 1970s, he moved permanently to Los Angeles, and for a period managed the Impressions. He also worked with leading jazz musicians, including Count Basie, Buddy Rich, Kurt Elling, and Tony Williams. In the 1980s, he became chief executive of jazz fusion label Headfirst Records.

Traut died in California in 2014, aged 85.
