= Lady (Styx song) =

1973 song

- Cover of German reissue version

Single by Styx

from the album Styx II
- B-side: "Children of the Land"
- Released: September 1973 (US): November 1974 (reissue)
- Recorded: Late 1972
- Genre: Progressive rock
- Length: 2:58
- Label: Wooden Nickel Records / RCA Records
- Songwriter: Dennis DeYoung
- Producer: John Ryan

Styx singles chronology
"Best Thing" (1972)	"Lady" (1973)	"You Need Love" (1975)

"Lady" is a 1973 power ballad written and performed by the rock band Styx. It was first released on Styx II and was a local hit in the band's native Chicago, but initially failed to chart nationally. The song gained success shortly after Styx left Wooden Nickel Records to move to A&M Records in 1974 as it began picking up airplay nationwide, eventually peaking at #6 on the Billboard Hot 100 in March 1975. The power ballad was later re-recorded for the 1995 Styx compilation Greatest Hits due to a contractual dispute between A&M and Wooden Nickel.

== Background ==
"Lady" was written by Dennis DeYoung for his wife, Suzanne Feusi, the first song he ever wrote for her. DeYoung recounted to Contemporary Keyboard magazine for the January 1981 issue that the first time he ever played acoustic piano was when the band arrived at the recording studio to record "Lady" and saw the piano in the studio; DeYoung had written the song on an electric piano, but decided to try it out on the piano instead, and liked the sound so much that he switched to the piano for the recorded version. It didn't get much promotion and went nowhere until a DJ named Jeff Davis on WLS in Chicago rediscovered the song when he heard it on a jukebox at a pizza place on the north side of Chicago. Determined to make it a hit, Smith convinced management to let him play the song on his Saturday Night show, which had an audience in 38 states and a few foreign countries. The song became a major hit on the station, spending two weeks at #2 on the WLS survey, and was ranked as the 29th biggest hit of 1975 on their year-end countdown.

Record World called it an "infectious rocker [that] is ignited by crisp harmonies and several sharp rhythm changes." Classic Rock critic Malcolm Dome rated it as the band's 9th greatest song.

This is the only song from the band's four Wooden Nickel-era albums that is still performed live; all other material from those years has been long disowned by the band. Former lead singer Dennis DeYoung also performs the song regularly on his solo tours.

"Lady" has been credited as the first power ballad.

== Composition ==
"Lady" begins with an Alberti bass pattern in the left hand on the piano. The Alberti bass, common to music of the Classical era, can also be heard on DeYoung's composition "Come Sail Away". One possible interpretation for the scale of the song is C Lydian, since the song starts with a D major chord, but moves down to C major with the ♯4 still being played in the right hand melody. Drums and distorted electric guitar come in at 1:17 in the recording, corresponding with high harmonies as well.

== Reception ==
Louder Sound and Billboard ranked "Lady" at number nine and number five, respectively, on their lists of the 10 greatest Styx songs.

== Personnel ==
- Dennis DeYoung – lead vocals, keyboards
- James "JY" Young – guitar, backing vocals
- John Curulewski – guitar, backing vocals
- Chuck Panozzo – bass
- John Panozzo – drums, percussion

== Charts ==
=== Weekly charts ===
Chart (1975)	Peak position
Australian Singles (Kent Music Report)	23
Canada Top Singles (RPM)	19
New Zealand (Recorded Music NZ)	17
South African Singles (Springbok)	3
US Billboard Hot 100	6
U.S. Cash Box Top 100	6
Zimbabwe (ZIMA)	2

=== Year-end charts ===
Chart (1975)	Peak position
Canada Top Singles (RPM)	148
South African Singles (Springbok)	15
U.S. Billboard Hot 100	60
U.S. Cash Box	30

=== Personnel ===
- Dennis DeYoung - lead vocals, keyboards
- James Young - lead guitar, backing vocals
- John Curulewski - rhythm guitar, backing vocals
- Chuck Panozzo - bass
- John Panozzo - drums

== Lady '95 ==
"Lady '95"

Song by Styx

from the album Styx: Greatest Hits
- Released: 1995
- Recorded: 1995
- Genre: Rock
- Length: 3:05
- Label: A&M Records
- Songwriter: Dennis DeYoung
- Producer: Dennis DeYoung

"Lady '95" is a 1995 re-recording of the 1973 song "Lady". It was rerecorded as a result of a contractual dispute between A&M Records and Wooden Nickel Records. It solely appears on A&M compilations, most notably Styx: Greatest Hits, for which the song was rerecorded.

=== Background ===
The 1995 A&M compilation Styx: Greatest Hits could not use the original version of "Lady" because the song was originally recorded for and released through Wooden Nickel Records (which also had a distribution arrangement with RCA Records). Because A&M/PolyGram had been unable to secure distribution rights to the song, most of the original lineup of Styx (Dennis DeYoung, Chuck Panozzo, and James "J.Y." Young) reunited with longtime guitarist Tommy Shaw to re-record the track at Dennis's home studio, The White Room. They were joined by uncredited session drummer Todd Sucherman, who filled in for John Panozzo due to Panozzo's failing health; Sucherman officially (and permanently) joined the band in 1996, during the Return to Paradise tour, and is included in the present lineup. The track, which is very similar to the original, was titled "Lady '95". The recording of the track ultimately led to the classic lineup of Styx (except for John Panozzo) reuniting.

=== Reception ===
The re-recorded version received mixed reviews from fans. Some claimed that the production was better than the original version. However, other fans still stick to the original because the original was the one that hit #6 on the charts.

=== Personnel ===
- Dennis DeYoung - lead vocals, keyboards
- James Young - lead guitar, backing vocals
- Tommy Shaw - rhythm guitar, backing vocals
- Chuck Panozzo - bass
- Todd Sucherman - drums

== Other media ==
This song has been featured in various television programs, including episodes of It's Always Sunny in Philadelphia, Freaks and Geeks, The Office, and Still Standing. It has also appeared in films such as The Perfect Man, Old School, and Underdog.

Homer Simpson, as Odysseus, endures this song as he crosses the River Styx in the Simpsons episode "Tales from the Public Domain", groaning "This truly is hell!"

Dennis DeYoung sang the song with Hal Sparks in 2006 on the show Celebrity Duets.
