= Wooden Nickel Records =

- Founded: 1971
- Founder: Bill Traut, Jim Golden, Jerry Weintraub
- Defunct: 1977
- Status: Defunct
- Distributor: RCA
- Genre: Rock
- Country of origin: U.S.
- Location: Chicago, Illinois

Wooden Nickel Records was an American independent record label started in 1971 by Bill Traut, Jim Golden and Jerry Weintraub as a successor to Dunwich Records. Most of Wooden Nickel's releases were by acts based in the Chicago area, including the Siegel–Schwall Band, James Lee Stanley, Megan McDonough and Styx. The label had a distribution deal with RCA Records. Wooden Nickel ceased operations after its top act, Styx, signed with A&M Records in 1975. The label sued the band for breach of contract, then was formally disbanded in 1977.

== Discography ==
=== Albums: WNS-1000 Series ===
- Wooden Nickel – Wooden Nickel, 1971, WNS-1000
- String Cheese – String Cheese, 1971, WNS-1001
  Produced by James Lee Golden and Barry Fasman. Artists: Greg Block, Louis Constantino, William Dalton, John Maggi, Sally Smaller, and Lawrence W. Wendelken.
- The Siegel-Schwall Band – Siegel-Schwall Band, 1971, WNS-1002
  This album cover won a Grammy in 1972 for album cover of the year. Produced by Bill Traut and Peter Szillies. Partly recorded live at The Quiet Knight, Chicago.
- David Patton – David Patton, 1971, WNS-1003
  Produced by Jim Golden and Barry Fasman. Country album with Larry Brown, Larry Carlton, Buddy Emmons, Tom Hensley and Bill Perry.
- In the Megan Manner – Megan McDonough, 1972, WNS-1004
  Country album with Larry Carlton, Larry Brown, Sneaky Pete Kleinow and Bill Perry. Produced by Bob Monaco, James Lee Golden, and Barry Fasman.
- Buckeye – David Patton, 1972, WNS-1005
  Country album with Larry Brown, Larry Carlton, Buddy Emmons, Gib Guilbeau, Michael Lang, Lincoln Mayorga, Bill Perry and Maxine Waters Willard.
- Megan Music – Megan McDonough, 1972, WNS-1007
  Artists:Larry Brown, Larry Carlton, David Bennett Cohen, Barry Fasman, Jim Gordon, Tom Hensley, Laroon Holt, Danny Kortchmar, Russ Kunkel,
  Bill Perry and Leland Sklar. John Denver wrote the liner notes.
- Styx – Styx, 1972, WNS-1008
  The debut album of this very successful band. Produced by Bill Traut and John Ryan. Reissued in 1975 as BWL1-1008; in 1978 as RCA AFL1-3110,
  in 1979 as Styx I on RCA AFL1-3593 and in 1981 as Styx I on RCA AYL1-3888.
- Wolfman Jack – Wolfman Jack, 1972, WNS-1009
  An album of covers with the liner notes written by Isaac Hayes, Leon Russell and Todd Rundgren. Reissued in 1975 as BWL1-1009.
  Produced by Golden and Don Sciarrotta of the Quantum Recording Studio.
- Sleepy Hollow – Siegel-Schwall Band, 1972, WNS-1010
  Produced by the band.
- James Lee Stanley – James Lee Stanley, 1973, WNS-1011
  Produced by Barry Fasman and Jim Stanley. Musicians: John Batdorf, Larry Carlton, Doug Dillard, Donald "Duck" Dunn, Gib Guilbeau, John Barlow Jarvis,
  Russ Kunkel, Michael Omartian, Mark Rodney and Mark Tulin.
- Styx II – Styx, 1973, WNS-1012
  Produced by John Ryan and Bill Traut. Reissued in 1975 as Wooden Nickel BWL1-1012, in 1979 as Lady on RCA AFL1-3594, in 1982 as Lady on RCA AYL1-4233.

=== Albums: RCA Consolidated Series ===
- Through the Ages – Wolfman Jack, 1973, BWL1-0119. Produced for Quantum by Dick Monda and Don Sciarrotta.
- Exile – Exile, 1973, BWL1-0120
- 953 West – Siegel-Schwall Band, 1973, BWL1-0121
- Keepsake – Megan McDonough, 1973, BWL1-0145
  Artists: Samuel Boghossian, Larry Carlton, Ronald Folsom, James Getzoff, Pamela Goldsmith, Jim Gordon, Jim Horn, Paul Hubinon, William Kurasch,
  Lew McCreary, Ollie Mitchell, MichaelJohn Batdorf, Omartian, Joe Osborne, Ralph Schaeffer, Sidney Sharp and Ernie Watts.
- James Lee Stanley, Too – James Lee Stanley, 1973, BWL1-0146
  Artists: Deed Abbate, John Batdorf, Larry Carlton, Don Dunn, Jim Gordon, Jim Horn, Russ Kunkel, Lew McCreary, Michael Omartian, Mark Tulin and Ernie Watts.
- The Serpent Is Rising – Styx, 1974, BWL1-0146 (2-74, #192) Reissued in 1979 as Serpent on RCA AFL1-3595, and in 1981 as Serpent on RCA AQL1-4111.
- Last Summer: The Siegel-Schwall Band Live – Siegel-Schwall Band, 1974, BWL1-0288
- Three's the Charm – James Lee Stanley, 1974, BWL1-0430
  Artists: Bud Brisbois, Colin Cameron, Larry Carlton, Emmett Chapman, Larry Hanson, Jim Horn, John Barlow Jarvis, Russ Kunkel, Lew McCreary, Ollie Mitchell,
  Michael Omartian, Bill Perkins and Sid Sharp.
- Magic – Richie Lecéa, 1974, BWL1-0431
  Artists: Tom Hensley, Charles Larkey, Andy Newmark and Dean Parks.
- Sketches – Megan McDonough, 1974, BWL1-0499
  Artists: Larry Brown, Larry Carlton, Wilton Felder, Tom Hensley and Dean Parks.
- R.I.P. – Siegel-Schwall Band, 1974, BWL1-0554
- Mo – Mo McGuire, 1974, BWL1-0635
  Musicians: Mike Bezin, Gavin Christopher, Pat Ferreri, Terry Fryer, Bruce Gaitsch, Jon Hopkins, Richard Kanter, Harvey Levy, Wes Mix, Shelly Plotkin,
  Caleb Quaye, Tom Radtke, Don Roth, Bob Schiff, Jim Schwall, Erik Scott, Corky Siegel, Billy Steele, Bill Traut and Bud Van Horn.
- Man of Miracles – Styx, 1974, BWL1-0638 (11-74, #154). Reissued in 1979 as Miracles on RCA AFL1-3596.
- It's All Done with Mirrors – Richie Lecéa, 1975, BWL1-0673
  Artists: Tom Hensley, Charles Larkey, Andy Newmark and Dean Parks.
- Come Again – The Jaggerz, 1975, BWL1-0772
- Schizoid – Boa, 1975, BWL1-0790
  Artists: Roger Alther, Dennis Belfield, Roger Kahn, Lewis Mark, Mickey McMeel, Thomas Obomsawin, Ron Stockert and Robert Zinner.
- Zazu – Zazu, 1975, BWL1-0791
  Produced by Zazu, Bill Trout, and Barry Mraz. Artists: Randy Curlee, Mickey Lehocky, John Melnick and Paul Ricupero.
- Best of Styx – Styx, 1977, BWL1-02250
  Reissued in 1979 as RCA AFL1-3597 with a different cover.

=== CD ===
- Varèse Sarabande/Varèse Vintage VSD-6006 - The Very Best of the Siegel-Schwall Band: The Wooden Nickel Years (1971-1974) - Siegel-Schwall Band [1999]

=== Singles: 65 prefix series ===
Wooden Nickel singles, like the albums, started with their own numbering system, but in 1973 were put into the consolidated RCA numbering system where they shared a catalog numbering sequence with all of the RCA-distributed labels. The label design was the same as for the albums, that is, a brown, wood-like color with a buffalo nickel backdrop, and "wooden nickel" in white at the top of the label. Promotional records used the same design, with "NOT FOR SALE" printed on the label. Promo copies usually featured the same song on both sides, one mono and one stereo. The deejay numbers on the 65–0100 series were completely different (e.g., the promo issue of "Guitar Picker" was SP/SPS-45-314 vs. the commercial issue of 65-0105). The WB-10000 series deejay issues used the same numbers, but with a "JH-" prefix instead of "WB-".

- 65-0100 - David Patton - "The Devil in Me" / "You Are Gone" (1971)
- 65-0102 - Megan McDonough - "Pocketful" / "Don't Worry Mama" (1972)
- 65-0103 - David Patton - "Her" / "Like Tonight" (1972)
- 65-0104 - Siegel-Schwall Band - "Always Thinking of You Darling" / "Sleepy Hollow" (1972)
- 65-0105 - Megan McDonough - "Guitar Picker" / "Stay in Touch" (1972)
- 65-0106 - Styx - "Best Thing" (9-72, #82) / "What Has Come Between Us" (1972)
- 65-0107 - David Patton - "People in Dallas Got Hair" / "Los Angeles Leavin'" (1972)
- 65-0108 - Wolfman Jack - "I Ain't Never Seen a White Man" (9-72, #106) / "Gallop" (1972)
- 65-0109 - Megan McDonough - "Lady in Love" /"On the Shores of Your Tomorrow" (1972)
- 65-0110 - Wolfman Jack - "There's an Old Man in Our Town" / "Hey Wolfman" (1972)
- 65-0111 - Styx - "I'm Gonna Make You Feel It" / "Quick Is the Beat of My Heart" (1972)
- 65-0112 - Megan McDonough - "Broken Guitar" / "No Return" (1973)
- 65-0113 - James Lee Stanley - "Every Minute" / "I Knead You" (1973)
- 65-0114 - Siegel-Schwall Band - "Good Time Band" / "Hey Billy Jean" (1973)
- 65-0115 - Exile - "Devil's Bite" / "Mabel" (1973)
- 65-0116 - Styx - "Lady" / "You Better Ask" (1973)
- 65-0117 - Wolfman Jack - "Ling Ting Tong" / "Johnny Do It Faster" (1973)
- 65-0118 - James Lee Stanley - "Wishing Well" / "This Could Be Goodbye" (1973)

=== Singles: RCA APB0 series ===
The series used four prefix characters, the first of which indicated if the single was on the RCA parent label (=A) or a subsidiary/distributed label (=B). The second letter indicated the label, with "W" indicating Wooden Nickel. The third letter was mostly "B" except for a few pop artists' reissues (=A). The final character was intended to always be a "0" (zero), but was often erroneously typeset as a capital O. Since several labels shared the sequence, the Wooden Nickel numbers are not continuous.

- BWB0-0006 - Exile - "Do What You Think You Should" / "Hold Tight Sweet Woman" (1973)
- BWB0-0032 - Megan McDonough - "Daddy Always Liked a Lady" / "Wishing" (1973)
- BWB0-0065 - Styx - "You Need Love" / "Winner Take All" (1973)
- BWB0-0066 - Siegel-Schwall Band - "Old Time Shimmy" / "Blow Out the Candle" (1973)
- BWB0-0110 - Wolfman Jack - "The Rapper" / "My Girl" (1973)
- BWB0-0137 - Megan McDonough - "Love Comes and Love Goes" Stereo / "Love Comes and Love Goes" Mono (1974)
- BWB0-0138 - James Lee Stanley - "Afternoon Rain" / "Lydia" (1974)
- BWB0-0190 - Siegel-Schwall Band - "I Think It Was the Wine" / "Traitor from Decatur" (1974)
- BWB0-0207 - Christopher - "Henry's Highway" /"Get Me Goin' in the Right Direction" (1974)
- BWB0-0252 - Styx - "Young Man" / "Unfinished Song" (1974)
- BWB0-0264 - Richie Lecéa - "Magic Is You" / "Season of the Mist" (1974)
- BWB0-0322 - Mo McGuire - "Mama Was a Cowgirl" / "Saturday Night in the Summertime" (1974)

=== Singles: RCA "PB" series ===
RCA Consolidated numbering system changes to the PB-10000 sequence, with the letter prefixes pared down to the middle two letters of the four-letter combination above.

- WB-10004 - James Lee Stanley - "Plenty of Reason" / "Windmill" (1974)
- WB-10027 - Styx - "Lies" /"22 Years" (1974)
- WB-10043 - Richie Lecéa - "Season of the Mist" /"Slowin' Down But Goin' Faster" (1974)
- WB-10101 - Mo McGuire - "First of May" / "Just About Over the Hill" (1974)
- WB-10102 - Styx - "Lady" (12-74, #6) / "Children of the Land" (Short Version) (1974)
- WB-10107 - Donny Mann - "I'm a Weak Man" / "Try Me" (1974)
- WB-10193 - Boa - "Crazy Days" / "Love Ranger" (1975)
- WB-10194 - The Jaggerz - "2+2" / "Don't It Make You Want to Dance" (1975)
- WB-10272 - Styx - "You Need Love" (5-75, #88) / "You Better Ask" (1975)
- WB-10329 - Styx - "Best Thing" / "Havin' a Ball" (1975)
- GB-10492 - Styx - "Lady" / "Children of the Land" (1975)
- WB-11205 - Styx - "Best Thing" / "Winner Take All" (1978, Golden Standard Series)

=== Singles: promotional ===
- SP/SPS-45-299 - Megan McDonough - "Pocketful" (mono) / "Pocketful" (stereo) [1972]
- SP/SPS-45-314 - Megan McDonough - "Guitar Picker" (mono) / "Guitar Picker" (stereo) [1972]
- SPS/SP-45-411 - Wolfman Jack - "There's an Old Man in Our Town" (stereo) / "There's an Old Man in Our Town" (mono) [1972]
- SPS-45-442 - Styx - "Father O.S.A." / "A Day" [1972]
- JH-10272 - Styx - "You Need Love" (stereo) / "You Need Love" (mono)

== See also ==
- List of record labels
- Styx: The Complete Wooden Nickel Recordings
