= Styx (band) =

American rock band

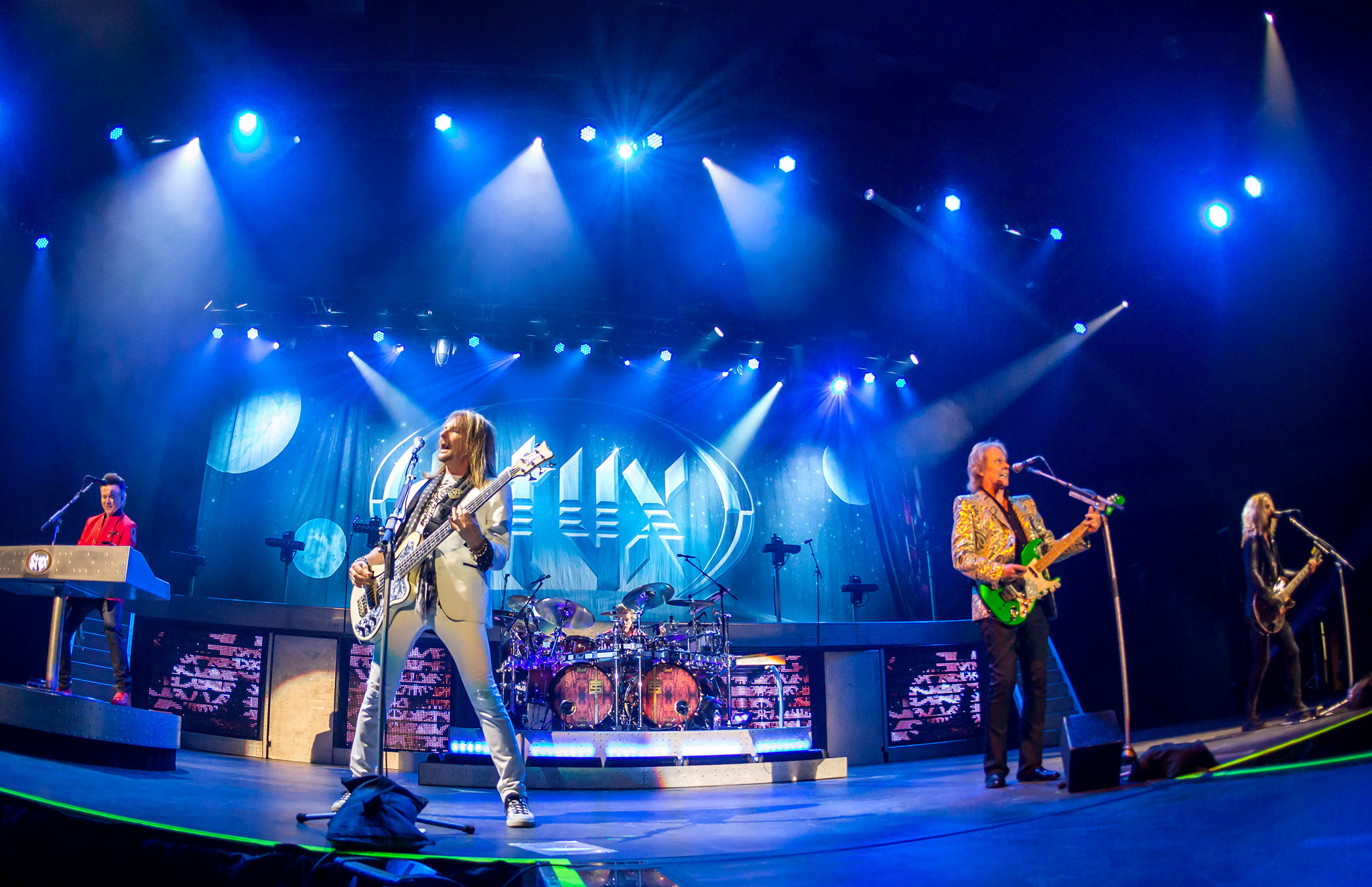
- Styx in 2017. L-R: Lawrence Gowan, Ricky Phillips, Todd Sucherman, James "JY" Young, and Tommy Shaw

Background information
- Origin: Chicago, Illinois, U.S.
- Genres: Progressive rock; art rock; hard rock; arena rock; pop rock
- Works: Discography
- Years active: 1972–1984; 1990–1992; 1995–present
- Labels: Wooden Nickel; A&M; Sanctuary; CMC International; New Door
- Spinoffs: Shaw Blades
- Members: James "J.Y." Young; Chuck Panozzo; Tommy Shaw; Todd Sucherman; Lawrence Gowan; Will Evankovich; Terry Gowan
- Past members: John "J.C." Curulewski; Dennis DeYoung; John Panozzo; Glen Burtnik; Ricky Phillips
- Website: styxworld.com

Styx (/ˈstɪks/) is an American rock band formed in Chicago, Illinois, in 1972. They are known for blending melodic hard rock guitar with acoustic guitar, synthesizers mixed with acoustic piano, upbeat tracks with power ballads, and incorporating elements of international musical theatre. The band established themselves with a progressive rock sound during the 1970s and began to incorporate pop rock and soft rock elements in the 1980s.

The original line-up comprised Dennis DeYoung, James "J.Y." Young, John "J.C." Curulewski, and brothers Chuck and John Panozzo. Debuting with Styx in 1972, the band usually released an album every year throughout the 1970s. Styx II (1973) had the sleeper hit "Lady", a power ballad, which reached No. 6 in the US, helping the album make the top 20. "Lady" was also a top 20 hit in Canada, Australia, and New Zealand. Equinox (1975) and Crystal Ball (1976) reached the US top 70 with Equinox featuring "Lorelei", a No. 6 hit in Canada. Crystal Ball was the first album with Tommy Shaw, who replaced Curulewski in late 1975.

Styx's commercial breakthrough in Northern America came with The Grand Illusion (1977), which peaked at No. 6 in both the US and Canada, and became the first of four straight multi-platinum albums in the US for Styx. It featured the single "Come Sail Away", a top 10 hit in both countries. The band's follow-up, Pieces of Eight (1978), was another No. 6 hit in the US, but peaked higher in Canada due to the top 10 hits "Renegade" and "Blue Collar Man (Long Nights)". In 1979, Styx's Cornerstone went to No. 2 in both countries on the strength of the cross-border No. 1 hit ballad "Babe". The album became their breakthrough album in Australia and New Zealand, with "Babe" peaking at No. 3. "Babe" was a No. 6 hit in the UK, and Cornerstone charted at No. 36.

In 1981, Styx's Paradise Theatre was a No. 1 album in the US and Canada, while also reaching the top 10 in Scandinavia and the UK (their biggest album there) and the top 30 in Australia and New Zealand. "The Best of Times" from the album reached No. 1 in Canada, No. 3 in the US, and the top 30 in several other countries, while "Too Much Time on My Hands" was also a top 10 hit in North America. Kilroy Was Here (1983) was Styx's last major hit album, reaching the top 3 in North America and the top 10 in Scandinavia, although it was less successful elsewhere. Its lead single, "Mr. Roboto", became Styx's third chart-topper in Canada, was a No. 3 hit in the US, and was their biggest hit in Germany (No. 8). After a six-year break, Styx returned with Edge of the Century (1990), which reached No. 63 in the US with its single, "Show Me the Way", becoming a top 3 hit in North America in early 1991.

Overall, Styx had eight songs that hit the top 10 on the US Billboard Hot 100, as well as 16 top 40 singles. Seven of their eight top 10 singles were written and sung by founding member and lead singer Dennis DeYoung, who has not been part of the band since 1999. Styx sold over 20 million records for A&M between their signing in 1975 and 1984.

== History ==
=== Band formation and the Wooden Nickel Years (1961–1974) ===
In August 1961, at 12 years of age, twin brothers Chuck (guitar) and John Panozzo (drums) first played music together with their 14-year-old neighbor Dennis DeYoung who played accordion and sang, while living in the Roseland, Chicago area, eventually using the band name The Tradewinds. Chuck left to attend seminary for a year but returned to the group by 1964. Tom Nardini had been brought in to replace Chuck Panozzo on guitar, so he decided to play bass when he returned to the band. John Panozzo was the drummer, while DeYoung had switched from accordion to keyboards. In 1965, the Tradewinds name was changed to TW4 (There Were 4) after another band, the Trade Winds, achieved fame nationally. By 1966, the Panozzo brothers had joined DeYoung at Chicago State College and kept the group together by performing at high schools and fraternity parties while studying to be teachers. In 1969 they added a college friend, folk guitarist John Curulewski, after Nardini departed. Hard rock guitarist James "J.Y." Young came aboard in 1970, making TW4 a quintet.

In 1972 the band members decided to choose a new name when they signed to Wooden Nickel Records after being spotted by a talent scout at a concert at St. John of the Cross Parish in Western Springs, Illinois (Young's hometown). Several suggestions were made and, according to DeYoung, the name Styx was chosen because it was "the only one that none of us hated."

The band released four albums with Wooden Nickel: Styx (1972), Styx II (1973), The Serpent Is Rising (1973), and Man of Miracles (1974). These albums contained straight-ahead rockers mixed with prog rock flourish with a lot of guitars, drums, keyboards, percussion, and vocal solos. They established a fan base in the Chicago area, but were unable to break into the mainstream, though the song "Best Thing" from Styx charted on September 16, 1972, and stayed on the Billboard Hot 100 chart for 6 weeks, peaking at No. 82. Then, the power ballad "Lady" (from Styx II), began to earn some radio time, first on WLS in Chicago in 1974 and then nationwide. In the spring of 1975, nearly two years after the album had been released, "Lady" hit No. 6 in the US, and Styx II went gold soon after. "Lady" is considered by many classic rock critics as being the first power ballad with Dennis DeYoung being referred to as the "father of the power ballad". With the success of "Lady," a follow-up single on Styx II, "You Need Love", was re-released, but only barely cracked the Hot 100.

=== Early A&M Years and addition of Tommy Shaw (1975–1978) ===
On the heels of its belated hit single, Styx signed with A&M Records. The band released Equinox in 1975, which sold well; the album yielded a minor hit in "Lorelei", which reached No. 27 in the U.S. More importantly, it contained the rock anthem "Suite Madame Blue", which gained the band considerable recognition and airplay on FM radio in the relatively-new Album Oriented Rock (AOR) format. Following the move to A&M, guitarist John Curulewski suddenly left the band as they were to embark on a nationwide tour in December 1975, due to his desire to spend time with his family. After a frantic last-minute search, the band brought in guitarist Tommy Shaw as Curulewski's replacement.

Crystal Ball (1976), the first album to feature Shaw, was moderately successful, but was overall a disappointment, failing to achieve the sales of its predecessor. The album showcased the band's newest member, as Shaw's "Mademoiselle" reached No. 36.

Styx's seventh album, The Grand Illusion, was released on July 7, 1977, and became their breakthrough album, reaching Triple Platinum certification. It spawned a top-ten hit and AOR radio staple in the DeYoung-written "Come Sail Away", which reached No. 8 in 1978. Shaw's "Fooling Yourself (The Angry Young Man)" was a second radio hit and reached No. 29 the same year.

Through the late 1970s and early 1980s, the band enjoyed its greatest success. Their 1978 album Pieces of Eight found the group moving in a more straight-ahead hard-rock direction and spawned three Shaw sung hit singles "Renegade" (No. 16 in the US) and "Blue Collar Man (Long Nights)" (No. 21 in the US), plus "Sing for the Day" that reached No. 41.

=== 1980s and superstardom ===
Their 1979 album Cornerstone yielded their only No. 1 hit, the DeYoung ballad "Babe". By early 1980, "Babe" had become the band's biggest international hit and first million-selling single, reaching No. 6 in the UK. The album also included the No. 26 DeYoung hit upbeat "Why Me" and the rocker "Borrowed Time" (U.S. No. 64), which was co-written with Shaw, plus Shaw's folksy "Boat on the River" (1980), which was a hit in much of Europe and Japan. The popularity of the album, which reached No. 2 on the Billboard 200, helped win the band a People's Choice Award for Best New Song in 1980. At the 22nd Grammy Awards, Styx was a nominee for Best Rock Vocal Performance by a Duo or Group and Cornerstone's engineers Gary Loizzo and Rob Kingsland were nominated for a Grammy for Best Engineered Recording. The band was also named the most popular rock band in the U.S. in the 1980 year end Gallup Poll.

With the success of "Babe," DeYoung's push for a more mainstream direction gained momentum, while Shaw and Young favored a more rock oriented approach. This arguing over musical direction led to ongoing tension in early 1980 after Shaw objected to the ballad "First Time" being released as the second single from Cornerstone. Although the song was generating substantial airplay in some major markets, A&M pulled the plug on the single's official release, replacing it with "Why Me". The argument resulted in DeYoung being briefly fired. However, things were quickly smoothed over. While "First Time" did not chart in the US (because it was not released), it became a huge hit single in the Philippines in 1981.

In January 1981, Styx released Paradise Theatre, a concept album that became their biggest hit, reaching No. 1 on the Billboard pop albums chart and yielding five singles, including the top ten hits "The Best of Times" by DeYoung (No. 3 Billboard, No. 1 Radio & Records) and "Too Much Time on My Hands" by Shaw (No. 9), his only top 10 single as a member of the band. Paradise Theatre became the band's fourth consecutive multi-platinum album. Based on yet another Dennis DeYoung concept, the Paradise Theatre was a historic Chicago theatre that had been built in the 20s only to fall on hard times and close a mere 30 years after it opened. DeYoung used the Paradise as a metaphor for the United States in the late 1970s/early 1980s.

An ambitious year long world tour commenced in 1981 in support of the album and was one of the top-grossing tours of the year. The tour had numerous Broadway and movie infused elements, including a dramatic opening featuring a theatre sweep and DeYoung by himself next to a player piano and the show ending with traditional movie credits. Throughout the tour and throughout the 1980s and beyond, the band would open their shows with "Rockin' the Paradise", the opening track from Paradise Theatre which charted at No. 8 on the Top Rocks Track Chart and aired on the MTV cable channel.

The band was accused by a California religious group and later the Parents Music Resource Center of backmasking Satanic messages in their anti-cocaine anthem, "Snowblind". James "JY" Young has denied this charge during his introduction for "Snowblind" when played live. Dennis DeYoung has denied the accusation as well, joking on the In the Studio with Redbeard program "we had enough trouble to make the music sound right forward." Also, Young quotes, "If we were going to put some message in our songs, we would have put it so it was in the song forward. Not so you would have to buy some $400 tape recorder to hear it."

=== Kilroy Was Here and first disbandment (1983–1984) ===
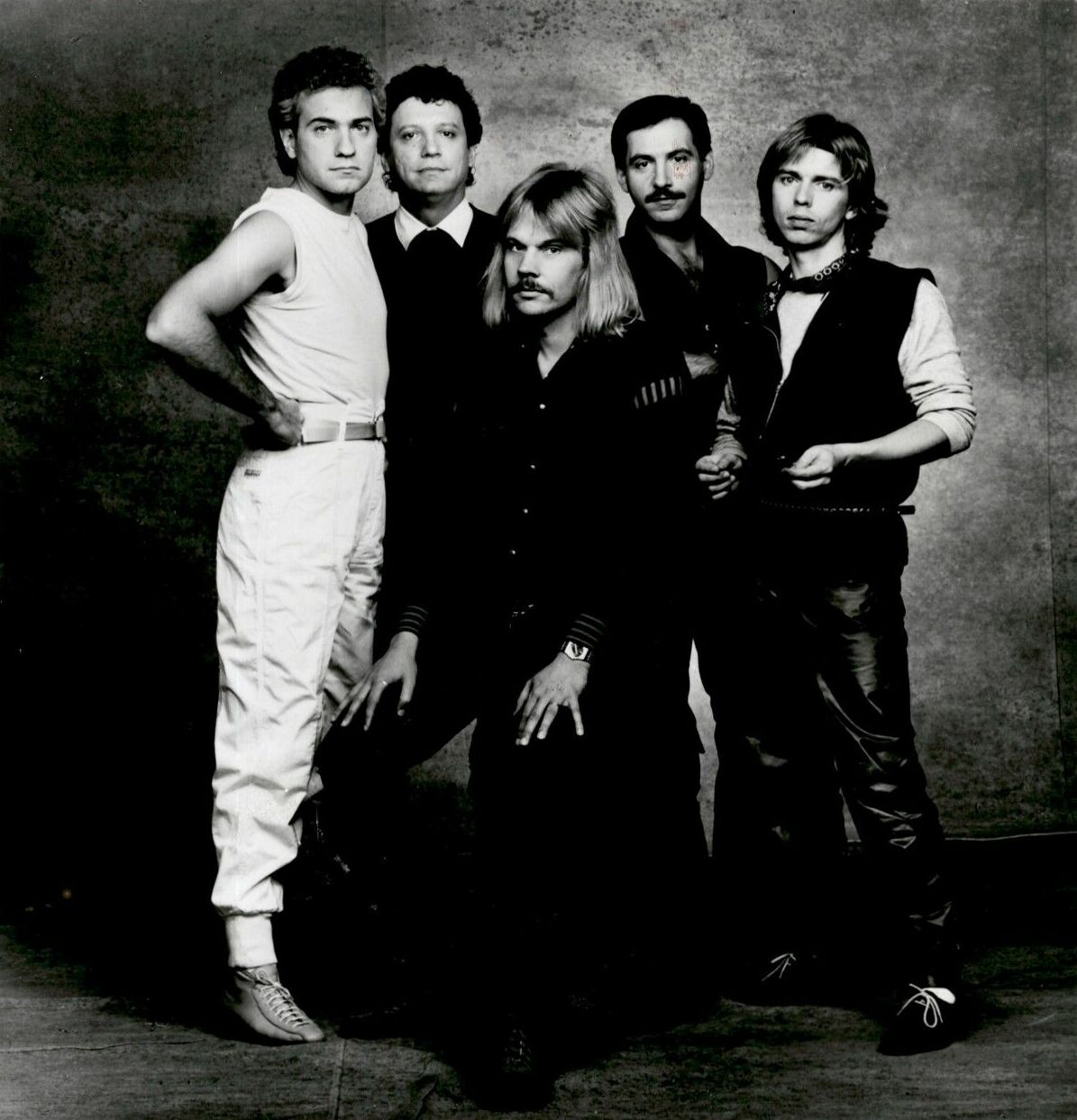
Styx in a 1983 publicity shot

The band continued to follow DeYoung's lead with their next project, Kilroy Was Here (1983), another more fully realized concept album, embracing the rock opera form. It is set in a future where performing and playing rock music has been outlawed due to the efforts of a charismatic evangelist, Dr. Everett Righteous, played by James "JY" Young. Kilroy Was Here featured DeYoung in the part of Kilroy, an unjustly imprisoned rock star. Tommy Shaw played the part of Jonathan Chance, a younger rocker who fights for Kilroy's freedom and the lifting of the ban on rock music. This future society is served by robots. Called Robotos, these automatons perform many jobs and several serve as Kilroy's prison guards.

Part of the impetus for the Kilroy story was the band's reaction to the backmasking accusation. The album included Young's song "Heavy Metal Poisoning", which includes lyrics sarcastically mocking the allegations against the group. Its introduction intentionally included a backward message, the Latin phrases, "annuit coeptis" and "novus ordo seclorum", from the reverse side of the Great Seal of the United States. Referring to the United States Declaration of Independence in 1776, these are translated, "Annuit cœptis - He (God) favors our undertakings, and Novus ordo seclorum - A new order of the ages." Both choices also served the Kilroy story because the villain is an evangelist that seeks to expand his Vision of Morality movement via mass demonstrations.

The album Kilroy Was Here went Platinum in 1983, boasting two Top Ten hits written and sung by DeYoung, the synthesizer-based "Mr. Roboto" (No. 3 US) and power ballad "Don't Let It End" (No. 6 US). The album earned a nomination as Best Engineered Recording for engineer and long-time friend Gary Loizzo and fellow engineers on the album Will Rascati and Rob Kingsland, for the 26th Grammy Awards (1983).

In 1983 the band mounted an ambitious stage show in support of Kilroy Was Here featuring theatrical presentations of three songs using instrumental backing tracks, including "Mr. Roboto", which featured DeYoung singing live while disguised as a Roboto, "Heavy Metal Poisoning" with Young as the evangelist Dr. Righteous singing while the Panozzo brothers acted as his henchmen on stage and "Haven't We Been Here Before" with Shaw as Jonathan Chance and DeYoung (as Kilroy in Roboto costume) duetting. The elaborate show was expensive to produce and was not as profitable as previous tours.

Kilroy Was Here brought the creative and competitive tensions within the band beyond the breaking point; this was further exacerbated following the band's performance of the Kilroy show at that year's Texxas Jam, an all day, multi-band rock festival held at the Cotton Bowl in Dallas. While most of the other acts on the bill, in comparison, put forth their "hardest rockers" the theatrics of the Kilroy show were not well received. A disillusioned Shaw departed the band for a solo career at the conclusion of the tour.

In 1984 the band released its first live album, Caught in the Act. The project featured one studio track, "Music Time", which became a Top 40 hit. The concert was also filmed and released on VHS under the same title (and on DVD in 2007). By the time of the album's release, they had already parted ways.

=== Reformation, Edge of the Century, second disbandment and reformation (1990–1996) ===
After the group members began discussing a reunion in the late '80s, this was delayed due to DeYoung's recording and the release of his solo album, Boomchild, which got pushed back to February 1989. Styx finally reformed in 1990, bringing in Glen Burtnik as a new guitarist since Shaw was by then committed to Damn Yankees.

The new line-up released one album, Edge of the Century, featuring the Dennis DeYoung ballad "Show Me the Way", which received an additional boost just prior to the first Persian Gulf War. Some radio stations edited the Top Three hit to include the voices of children, whose parents were deployed in Saudi Arabia between 1990 and 1991. The song went all the way to No. 3 on both the Hot 100 and at Adult Contemporary radio and notably remained in the top 40 for 23 weeks and AC for 31 weeks. With the huge success of the song "Show Me the Way", Styx joined a handful of musical acts to have top 10 singles in three decades and under four different presidential administrations.

A follow-up single, "Love At First Sight", peaked at No. 25 on the Hot 100 and No. 13 on the Adult Contemporary chart.

Styx toured across the US in the spring and summer of 1991 but their success was short-lived as they were dropped in 1992 after A&M Records was purchased by PolyGram Records, ending an over-fifteen-year relationship.

The band reunited once again in 1995, with guitarist Tommy Shaw returning to the fold to re-record "Lady" for Styx Greatest Hits. Session drummer Todd Sucherman filled in for John Panozzo, who was unable to participate due to liver problems caused by years of excessive drinking, which eventually claimed his life the following year on July 16.

The 1996 "Return to Paradise" tour, with Sucherman as a full member, was successful. The reunion tour was documented with a two-disc live set, 1997's Return to Paradise, which featured three new studio tracks: "On My Way", "Paradise" (a soft rock ballad that also appears in another version on Dennis DeYoung's 1996 The Hunchback of Notre Dame album), and "Dear John", a tribute to the late Panozzo that has become a cult favorite among Styx fans. Later on, the concert was documented on DVD. The Return to Paradise album was a surprise success in 1997, achieving gold status and the single "Paradise" briefly charting on the Adult Contemporary chart at No. 27. Following the release of the album, Styx embarked on another tour, this one to mark the 20th anniversary of The Grand Illusion.

=== Brave New World and departure of DeYoung (1999–2000) ===
Two years later, in 1999, the band released its first new studio album in almost a decade: Brave New World. But then, due to illness, DeYoung was unable to commit to touring, so he was replaced by Lawrence Gowan, a classically trained pianist, who had achieved platinum success as a solo act on Sony Canada. Gowan's 1985 solo hit "A Criminal Mind" was incorporated into their tour set list and was still performed into the 2010s.

Bassist Chuck Panozzo was sidelined in 1999 due to health problems related to his battle with HIV/AIDS. His public "coming out" occurred in 2001 at the annual Human Rights Campaign banquet, with James "JY" Young in attendance for support.

On June 6, 1999, the group reunited briefly to perform for the Children's Miracle Network Telethon as DeYoung's final performance with the band. Glen Burtnik filled in for Chuck Panozzo on bass.

On June 9, 2000, Styx appeared with REO Speedwagon at the Riverport Amphitheatre. A 2-CD recording of the concert was released as Arch Allies: Live at Riverport, with one disc of each band's set and both discs concluding with performances of the two bands collaborating on jam versions of Styx's "Blue Collar Man" and REO's "Roll with the Changes". Each band also released their set as a separate album, with additional tracks: Styx's version was At the River's Edge: Live in St. Louis.

=== Chuck Panozzo's reduced role, Cyclorama and Big Bang Theory (2003–2009) ===
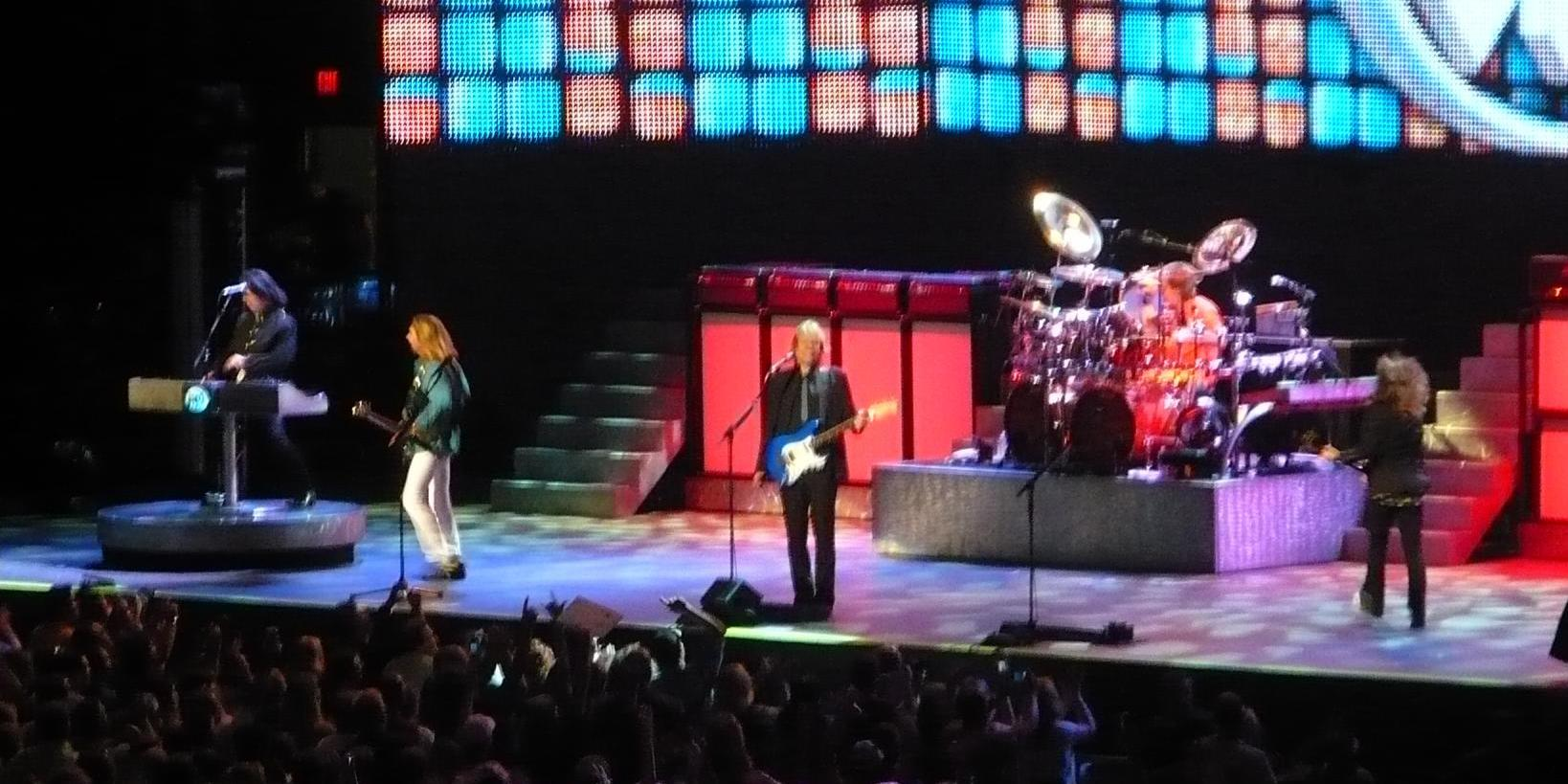
Styx performing in 2009

Styx's new lineup released several live albums and released the studio album Cyclorama in February 2003, which reached No. 127 on the Billboard 200 album charts. A single "Waiting for Our Time" hit No. 37 on the Billboard mainstream rock chart for 1 week. Styx toured extensively during this period and released additional live albums. Styx also was part of the Super Bowl pre game entertainment in San Diego prior to the Oakland Raiders vs. Tampa Bay Buccaneers. They played a short set in the parking lot, as well as on the field right before the game, playing Queen's "We Are the Champions".

Burtnik left Styx in September 2003, to spend time with his family and to pursue a solo career and release the album Welcome to Hollywood. He was replaced by Ricky Phillips, formerly of the Babys and Bad English. Panozzo remains in the band but is featured in concerts playing bass on about four songs, including a duet with Lawrence Gowan. Burtnik would go on to join up with DeYoung for numerous tour dates over the next several years.

On June 5, 2004, Styx participated in Eric Clapton's Crossroads Guitar Festival covering songs by Jimi Hendrix, B.B. King, and Slim Harpo with Jeff Baxter as a special guest.

In 2005, Styx released an album of cover tunes, Big Bang Theory, which reached the Billboard Top 50 on the album charts, their highest-charting album since 1990. Their version of the Beatles song "I Am the Walrus" received some radio play, and a video was made for the song.

=== Continued touring, The Mission, Crash of the Crown, and Circling from Above (2010–present) ===
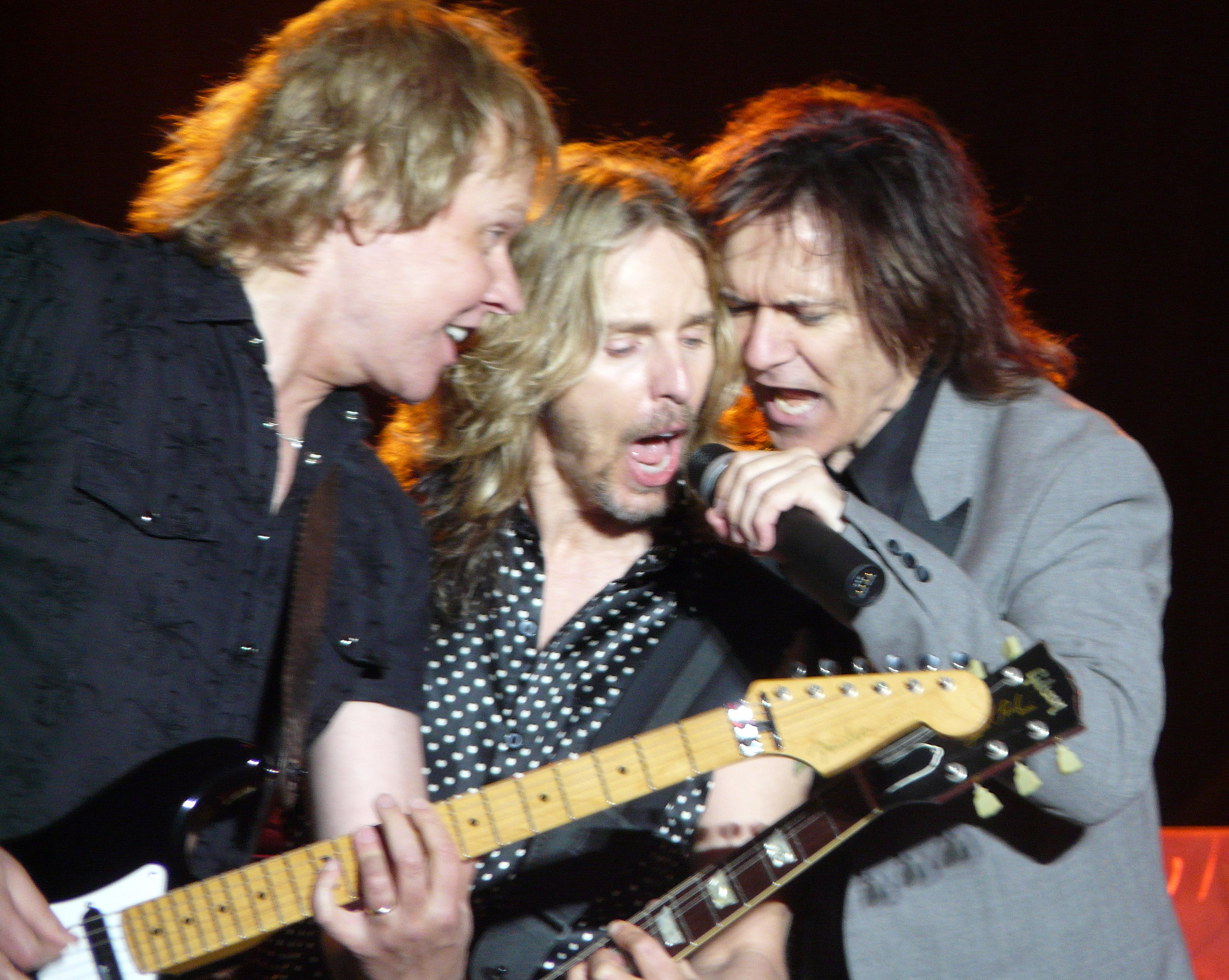
Styx performing in 2008 (left to right: Young, Shaw and Gowan)

On February 21, 2010, the current incarnation of the band performed before the Sprint Cup Auto Club 500 In Fontana, California. In a North American tour beginning in May 2010, Styx was a co-headliner of United in Rock with Foreigner and special guests Kansas. In July 2010, Styx announced the forthcoming release of Regeneration: Volume 1, a new release featuring six re-recorded hits and a new song entitled "Difference in the World". This coincided with "The Grand Illusion / Pieces of Eight Tour", on which both albums were played in their entirety.

In November 2010 Styx announced that they would be filming their concert in Memphis on November 9 for a DVD. The landmark concert was recorded at the historic Orpheum Theater, where Styx performed both of their classic albums, 1977's The Grand Illusion and 1978's Pieces of Eight. They also announced that they'd be touring the UK with Journey and Foreigner for five dates in June 2011.

In early April 2011, it was announced that Styx would join up with Yes for a "Progressive US Tour" that began on July 4, 2011, with Los Angeles-based singer-songwriter Shane Alexander opening. On December 15, 2011, they participated in the figure skating show Improv-Ice, which was broadcast on television January 15, 2012. On January 26, 2013, the Palladia Channel premiered the concert filmed in November 2010. On November 22, 2013, they announced a benefit concert with REO Speedwagon titled "Rock to the Rescue" to raise money for the affected families of the tornado in central Illinois.

The summer of 2014 found the band back on the road in a new touring package called Soundtrack of Summer, with Foreigner and ex-Eagle Don Felder. Styx's 2015 summer tour saw them re-uniting with Def Leppard. Along with Tesla, the groups played outdoor venues across the United States. In 2016, Styx announced a series of performances to be held at the Venetian in Las Vegas in early 2017 with Felder.

In February 2017, it was announced that Styx and REO Speedwagon would join forces in a tour entitled "United We Rock" with special guest Felder, which was in large concert venues throughout the US. On April 21, 2017, Styx announced a studio album entitled The Mission, simultaneously releasing the single "Gone Gone Gone". The album was released on June 16, 2017, and is a concept album about a mission to Mars.

On April 7, 2021, Styx announced via social media that they would be releasing an EP titled The Same Stardust, which would feature two new tracks, as well as some live recordings. The EP was released on vinyl on June 12, 2021, exclusively in indie record stores as a part of RSD Drops for Record Store Day 2021. This is the first Styx release to use their original band logo since The Complete Wooden Nickel Recordings in 2005.

From April 30, 2021, through May 5, 2021, Styx posted artwork on social media that included a countdown in the corner that would eventually lead to the revealing of their new album Crash of the Crown, revealed on May 6, 2021. With the reveal, they released the album's title track on streaming platforms. The Prog Report reviewed the album saying it "stands as one of the very finest in their catalogue."

Despite positive reviews, Crash of the Crown charted for only one week on the Billboard 200, peaking at 114.

After first producing The Mission and Crash of the Crown and joining Styx on stage in Las Vegas to play The Mission in its entirety on January 23, 2019, guitarist Will Evankovich joined Styx for their 2021 summer tour that found them back on the road.

On June 5, 2022, Styx was inducted into the Illinois Rock & Roll Museum Hall of Fame. That same night Dennis DeYoung was additionally inducted as a songwriter.

On March 20, 2024, it was announced via social media that Ricky Phillips would be leaving the band to spend more time at home and away from the road. On March 22, 2024, Lawrence Gowan's younger brother Terry debuted as the new touring bass player for Styx at their show in Wallingford, Connecticut. On May 17 he was announced as an official member.

In December 2024, it was announced that Styx would co-headline the "Brotherhood of Rock Tour" in with the Kevin Cronin Band (including former REO Speedwagon members Cronin, Dave Amato, and Bryan Hitt, and former REO Speedwagon touring musicians Derek Hilland and Matt Bissonette) would co-headline the "Brotherhood of Rock Tour" in summer 2025, with former Eagles guitarist Don Felder as their opening act (reuniting most of the three-act lineup from 2017's "United We Rock Tour", minus REO Speedwagon's Neal Doughty and Bruce Hall). It was later announced that Styx would be performing their album The Grand Illusion in full on tour (the Kevin Cronin Band would likewise be performing REO Speedwagon's Hi Infidelity album in full on the tour, along with other hits and classics, while Felder would be performing a mix of his solo songs and hits from his time in the Eagles).

On May 28, 2025, Styx announced their eighteenth studio album, Circling from Above, set for release on July 18 via Alpha Dog 2T/UMe. Produced by Will Evankovich, the 13-track album explores themes of human ambition, technology, and nature, and features contributions from all seven current members of the band. The lead single, "Build and Destroy," was released alongside an AI-generated music video, and physical copies of the album will be made available ahead of the digital release during the band's 2025 Brotherhood of Rock tour.

== Musical style ==
According to AllMusic, Styx' music "conveys art rock concepts with arena rock accessibility." The band's recorded catalog contains sentimental ballads in addition to what the site called "bombastic rockers." The band's early material drew comparisons to progressive rock acts such as Emerson, Lake & Palmer and the Moody Blues.

== Band members ==
=== Current ===
- James "J.Y." Young – guitars, backing and lead vocals, occasional keyboards (1972–1984, 1990–1991, 1995–present)
- Chuck Panozzo – bass, backing vocals (1972–1984, 1990–1991, 1995–present; part-time 2003–present)
- Tommy Shaw – guitars, lead and backing vocals, occasional mandolin and banjo (1975–1984, 1995–present)
- Todd Sucherman – drums, percussion, occasional backing vocals (1995–present)
- Lawrence Gowan – keyboards, lead and backing vocals, occasional acoustic guitar (1999–present)
- Will Evankovich – guitar, backing vocals, occasional mandolin and keyboards (2021–present; session musician, guest, and producer 2015–2021)
- Terry Gowan – bass, backing vocals (2024–present)

=== Former ===
- Dennis DeYoung – keyboards, lead and backing vocals (1972–1984, 1990–1991, 1995–1999)
- John Panozzo – drums, percussion, occasional backing vocals (1972–1984, 1990–1991; died 1996)
- John "J.C." Curulewski – guitar, backing and lead vocals, keyboards (1972–1975; died 1988)
- Glen Burtnik – guitar, backing and lead vocals, bass (1990–1991, 1999–2003)
- Ricky Phillips – bass, backing vocals, guitar (2003–2024)

== Discography ==
Studio albums

- Styx (1972)
- Styx II (1973)
- The Serpent Is Rising (1973)
- Man of Miracles (1974)
- Equinox (1975)
- Crystal Ball (1976)
- The Grand Illusion (1977)
- Pieces of Eight (1978)
- Cornerstone (1979)
- Paradise Theatre (1981)
- Kilroy Was Here (1983)
- Edge of the Century (1990)
- Brave New World (1999)
- Cyclorama (2003)
- Big Bang Theory (2005)
- The Mission (2017)
- Crash of the Crown (2021)
- Circling from Above (2025)

== Consecutive multi-platinum albums ==
From 1977 to 1981, Styx released four consecutive albums that have been certified Multi-Platinum, for at least 2 million units sold apiece, by the RIAA: The Grand Illusion (1977), Pieces of Eight (1978), Cornerstone (1979) and Paradise Theatre (1981).

A longstanding, oft-repeated claim in the music industry and the mainstream press is that Styx was the first band to release four consecutive Triple-Platinum albums, signifying at least 3 million units sold. During the period when these albums charted, the RIAA's only certifications were for Gold (500,000 units sold) and Platinum (1 million). Multi-Platinum awards were introduced in late October 1984. Following this development, record companies submitted their most popular artists' sales records to accountants to achieve the new thresholds. Styx did score three Triple-Platinum albums—The Grand Illusion (1977), Pieces of Eight (1978) and Paradise Theatre (1981)—and one Double-Platinum album—Cornerstone (1979)—on the same date, November 14, 1984. Complete and detailed historical sales figures for record albums are not readily available to the public, but the certifications, which can be found at the RIAA site, show that the feat the band actually achieved was being the first group to be awarded four consecutive Multi-Platinum albums with three of those ranking better than Double Platinum. Styx achieved another Double-Platinum album—Greatest Hits (Volume I)—on August 23, 2005.

== See also ==
- List of best-selling music artists
