= John Curulewski =

John "JC" Curulewski
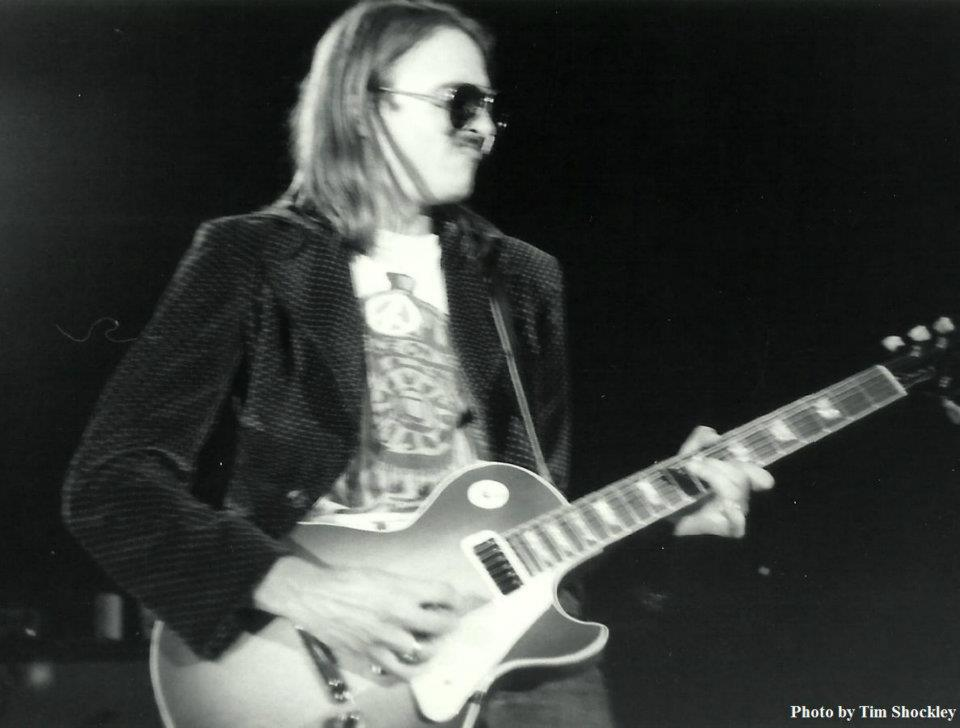
- Curulewski performing with Styx in 1974.

Background information
- Born: October 3, 1950; Chicago, Illinois, US
- Died: February 13, 1988 (aged 37) Midlothian, Illinois, US
- Genres: Progressive rock; hard rock
- Occupation: Musician
- Instruments: Guitar; vocals; keyboard
- Years active: 1968–1975
- Labels: Wooden Nickel, A&M
- Formerly of: Styx, Spread Eagle, Arctic Fox

John J. Curulewski (October 3, 1950 – February 13, 1988) was an American musician who was one of the original members of Styx. Curulewski played guitar and sang occasional lead vocals on the band's first five studio albums, released from 1972 to 1975. He left in 1975 due to disputes between him and the band and died in 1988.

== Career ==
In 1969, Curulewski joined the Chicago-based band TW4, featuring college friends Dennis DeYoung, Chuck Panozzo, and John Panozzo. The group evolved into Styx by 1972. Curulewski was described by tour manager Jim Vose as "the rebel of the group".

Just after the recording of the album Equinox in 1975, Curulewski left Styx to spend more time with his family, and was replaced by Tommy Shaw. One big factor in Curulewski's departure was an argument between him and DeYoung after a concert. Curulewski had laryngitis, and tried to cancel the show despite having around 10,000–12,000 people in attendance. After the concert finished and the band went backstage, DeYoung told Curulewski "I never want to go onstage with you again", to which he replied, "Okay, then I quit."

== Personal life and death ==
After his career with Styx, Curulewski became a guitar teacher in the Chicago area and played occasionally in local bands.

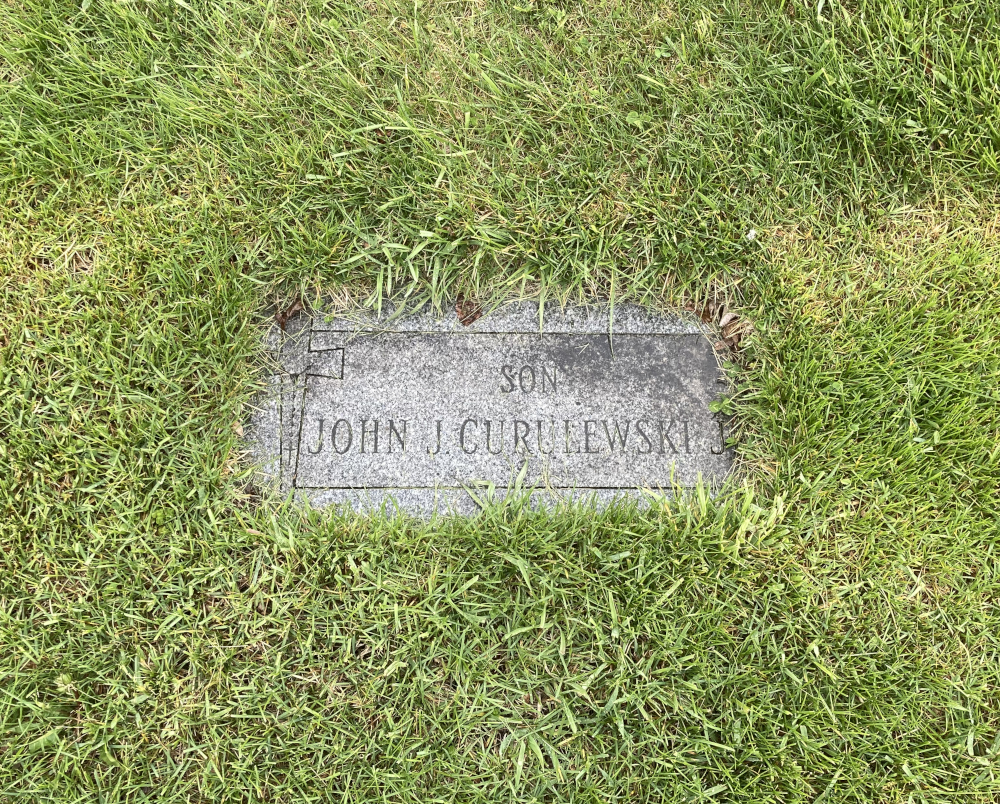
Curulewski's grave at St. Benedict Catholic Cemetery

He died at his home in Midlothian, Illinois on February 13, 1988, from a brain aneurysm, and was buried at St. Benedict Catholic Cemetery in Crestwood, Illinois.
