= John Panozzo =

American drummer (1948–1996)

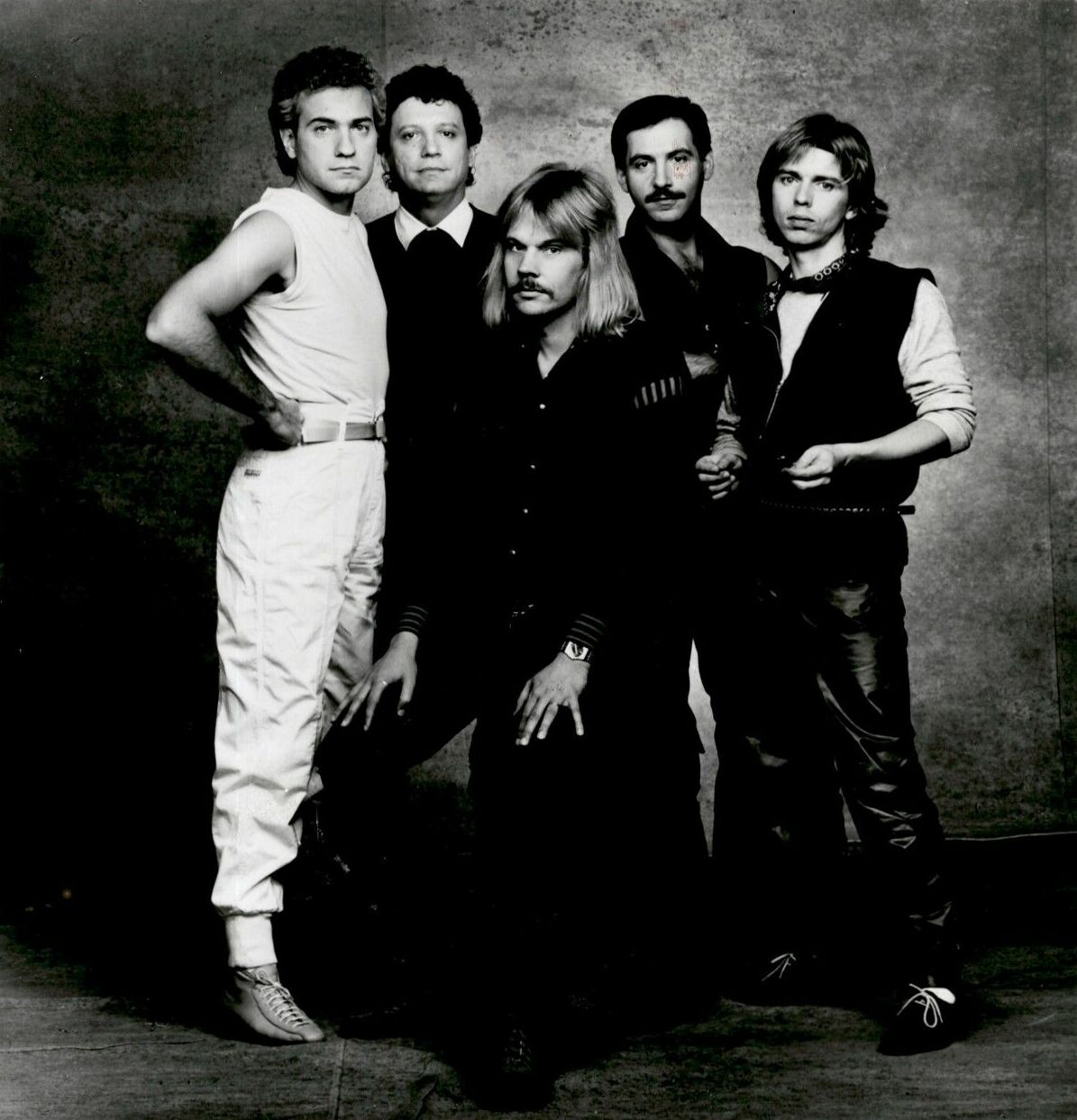
- Styx, 1983 publicity photo (Panozzo second from left)

Background information
- Born: John Anthony Panozzo; September 20, 1948; Chicago, Illinois, U.S.
- Died: July 16, 1996 (aged 47) Chicago, Illinois, U.S.
- Genres: Progressive rock, rock, hard rock
- Occupation: Musician
- Instrument: Drums
- Years active: 1956–1996
- Formerly of: Styx

John Anthony Panozzo (September 20, 1948 – July 16, 1996) was an American drummer best known for his work with rock band Styx.

== Early life ==
Panozzo was born to Tranquinino Panozzo and Elizabeth Lofrano Panozzo, both of whom were of Italian descent, and grew up in the Roseland neighborhood, the south side of Chicago, Illinois, with his fraternal twin brother, Chuck (born 20 minutes apart). Chuck and John also have an older sister, Emily. At age 7, the twins took musical lessons from their uncle in which John took an interest in drums and percussion. They attended Catholic school and eventually they were part of a three-piece band in which John played drums and Chuck played guitar. They would play weddings at age 12 and were paid $15 apiece.

== Styx ==
In 1961, John, Chuck, and their neighbor, Dennis DeYoung, formed a band called The Tradewinds in which John played drums, Chuck played guitar, and Dennis played the accordion and sang. They played local gigs at bars and began gaining popularity as a garage band on the city's South Side. In 1968, Chuck switched to bass and they added guitarists/vocalists James "J.Y." Young and John Curulewski, changing their name to TW4 (shortened from "Trade Winds Four"). The band signed to Wooden Nickel Records and changed their name to Styx.

The band's only number one in the US was "Babe", released in 1979. Other successful songs by Styx include "Mr. Roboto", "Show Me the Way", "The Best of Times", "Don't Let It End", "Lady", and "Come Sail Away".

In 1993, Panozzo played drums on two tracks for guitarist/vocalist James Young's solo album Out on a Day Pass.

== Death ==
Panozzo's grave at Holy Sepulchre Cemetery

He died of gastrointestinal hemorrhaging and cirrhosis in Chicago due to alcoholism on July 16, 1996. He was buried at Holy Sepulchre Cemetery in Alsip.
