= Chuck Panozzo =

American musician

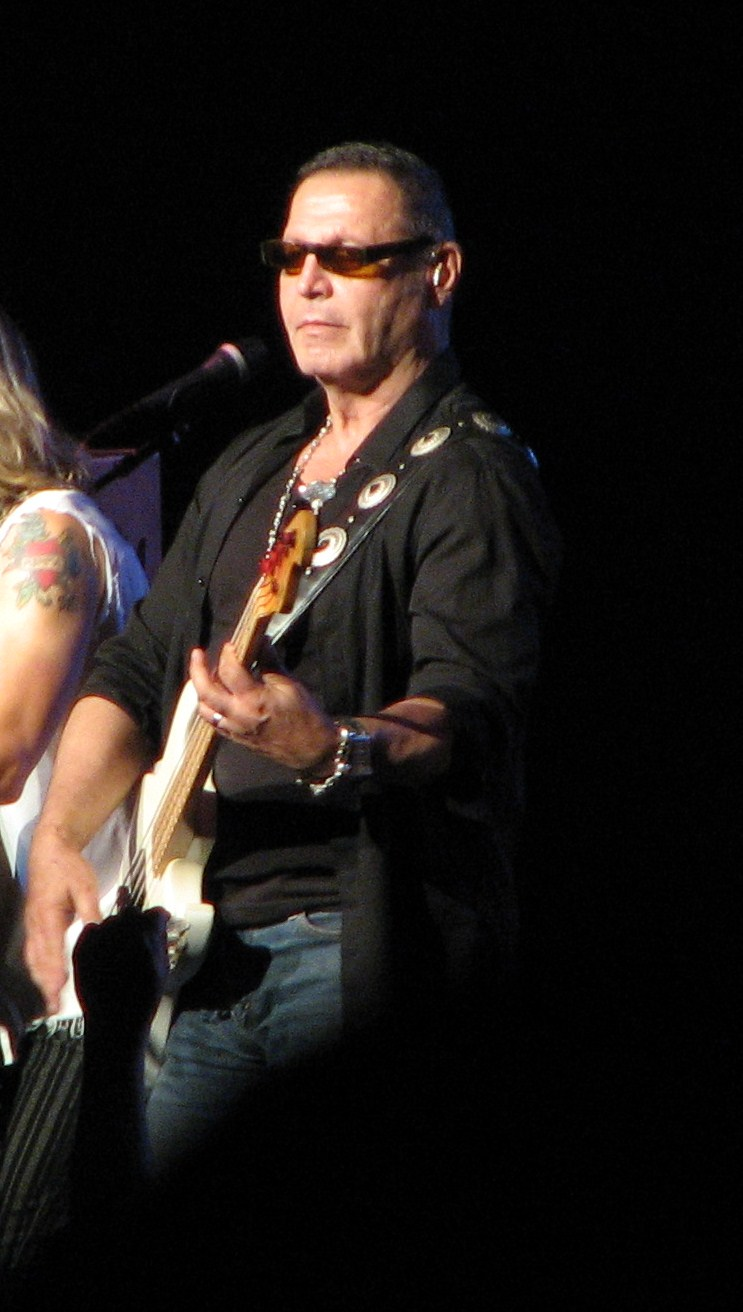

Background information
- Born: Charles Salvatore Panozzo; September 20, 1948 (age 78)
- Origin: Chicago, Illinois
- Genres: Hard rock; progressive rock
- Occupation: Bassist
- Years active: 1956–present
- Member of: Styx
- Website: www.chuckpanozzo.com

Charles Salvatore "Chuck" Panozzo (born September 20, 1948) is an American musician best known as a co-founder of the rock band Styx. He is currently a part-time bass player in the band, sharing bass duties with Terry Gowan. Panozzo is living with HIV, which played a role in limiting his full-time participation.

== Early life and education ==
Panozzo grew up in a working-class Italian Catholic neighborhood on the south side of Chicago, Illinois. At the age of 7, Panozzo and his fraternal twin brother, drummer John Panozzo, who died in July 1996, took music lessons from an uncle. He attended Catholic schools.

Panozzo received a degree in art education and taught art at the high school level. He left his teaching job to pursue his career in music with Styx.

== Styx ==
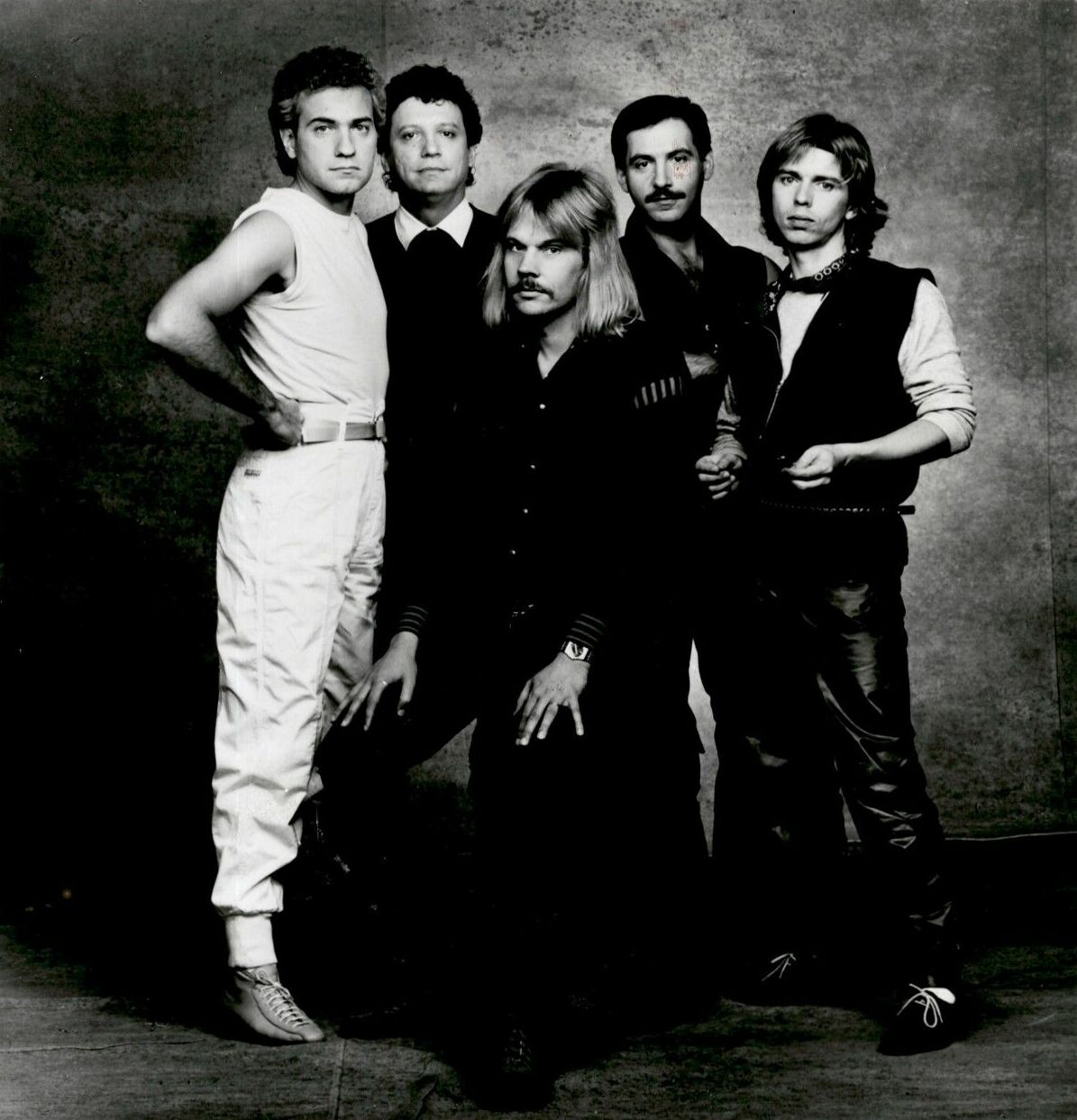
Styx, 1983 publicity photo (Panozzo second from right)

In 1961–1962, Panozzo founded a band which would eventually become Styx with his brother, John and singer/keyboardist Dennis DeYoung.

The band's only number one hit in the US was "Babe", released in 1979. Other successful songs by Styx are "Mr. Roboto", "Show Me the Way", "The Best of Times", "Don't Let It End", "Lady", and "Come Sail Away", the latter being used many times in pop culture.

Panozzo still tours in Styx, but is a part-time member, as a result of his body growing weaker through his battle with AIDS. Bassists Glen Burtnik, Ricky Phillips, and Terry Gowan have filled in for him over time.

== Sexuality and HIV diagnosis ==
According to Panozzo, he first realized his homosexuality when at age seven, he had broken his leg, and in school when the fire alarm went off, an older student had to help him out.

In 1991, he was diagnosed as HIV-positive, which he kept secret along with his sexuality. By 1998, the disease had progressed to AIDS. In 2001, at the Human Rights Campaign annual dinner, in front of 1,000 guests, Panozzo announced that he is gay and living with HIV.

Before publicly announcing his diagnosis and sexuality, the only other person who knew was his twin brother John, who had already died by the time it was revealed.

In 2007, he released his autobiography The Grand Illusion: Love, Lies, and My Life with Styx.

Panozzo has donated money to many AIDS research organizations. He lives with his partner, Tim.
