= James Young (American musician) =

American musician (born 1949)

James "J.Y." Young
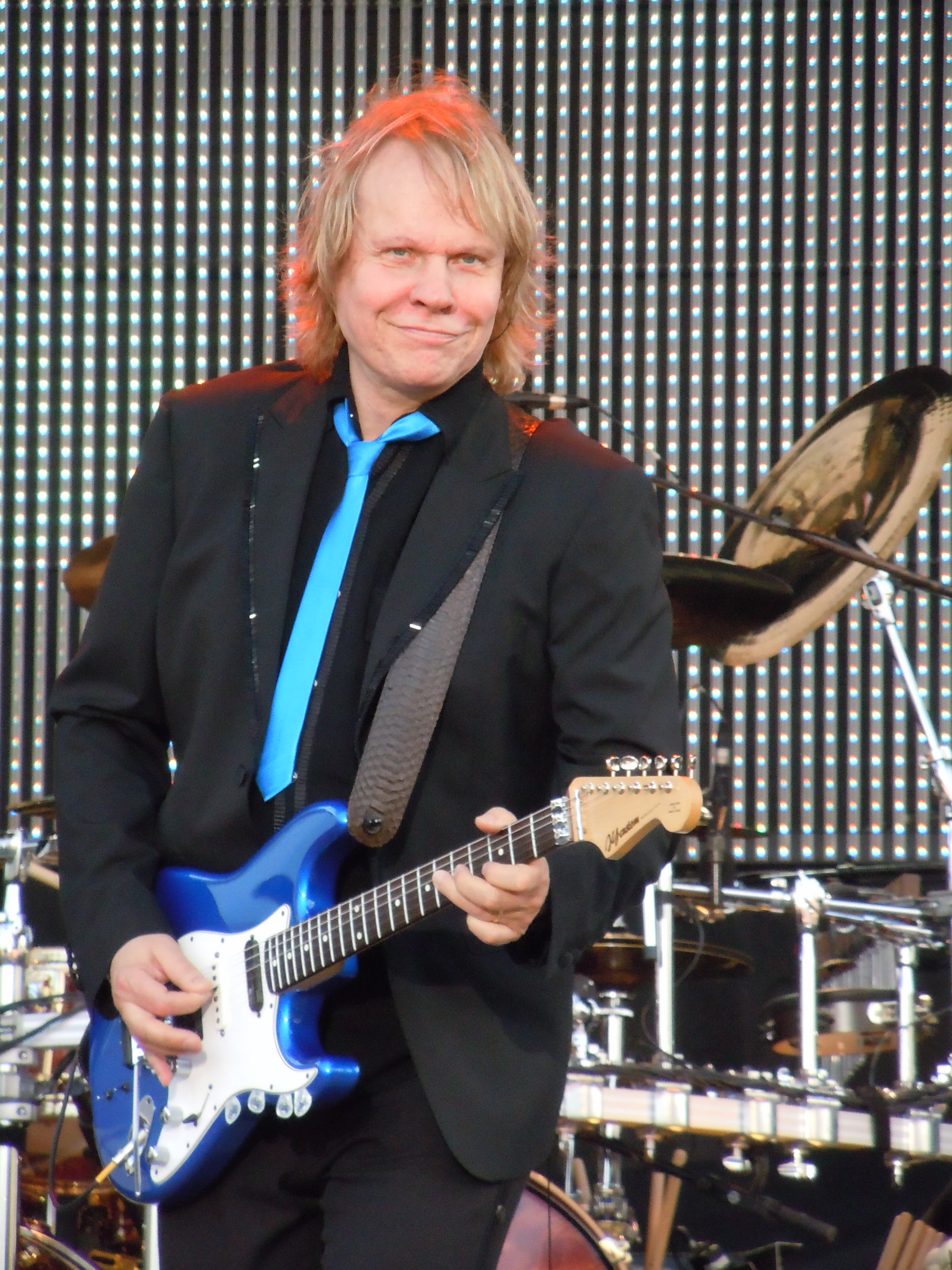
- Young performing with Styx in 2010

Background information
- Born: James Vincent Young; November 14, 1949 (age 76); Chicago, Illinois, US
- Genres: Hard rock; progressive rock
- Occupations: Musician; songwriter
- Instruments: Guitar; vocals
- Years active: 1966–present
- Labels: A&M; Passport; Absolute
- Member of: Styx
- Spouse: Susan Godsted (m. 1972; died 2022)

James Vincent Young (born November 14, 1949) is an American musician who is best known as a founding member, and one of the guitarists and occasional lead vocalists in the American rock band Styx. He is the only remaining full-time member out of the original lineup since 1999, following Dennis DeYoung's departure and Chuck Panozzo being reduced to a part-time role due to health issues.

== Early life, family and education ==
Young was born in Chicago, Illinois. He attended Calumet High School. His father, who he described as "very conservative", could play piano by ear. His idols were Jimi Hendrix, Eric Clapton, Johnny Winter, and Albert King.

Young graduated from Illinois Institute of Technology with a bachelor's degree in mechanical and aerospace engineering.

== Career ==
Young's first band, the Catalinas, won a "Best Teens in America" contest, came in third place at a Chicago talent competition, and toured Europe in 1966.

In 1970, Young joined the band TW4 while a college student. That band later became the first incarnation of Styx.

After Styx's initial breakup in 1984, Young collaborated with Jan Hammer on the album City Slicker (1985). Since reforming in 1995, Young is still a member of Styx.

== Personal life ==
Young was married to Susan Godsted for just over fifty years. Godsted had been partially paralyzed on the right side of her body as a result of a stroke. She died on November 10, 2022.

== Discography ==
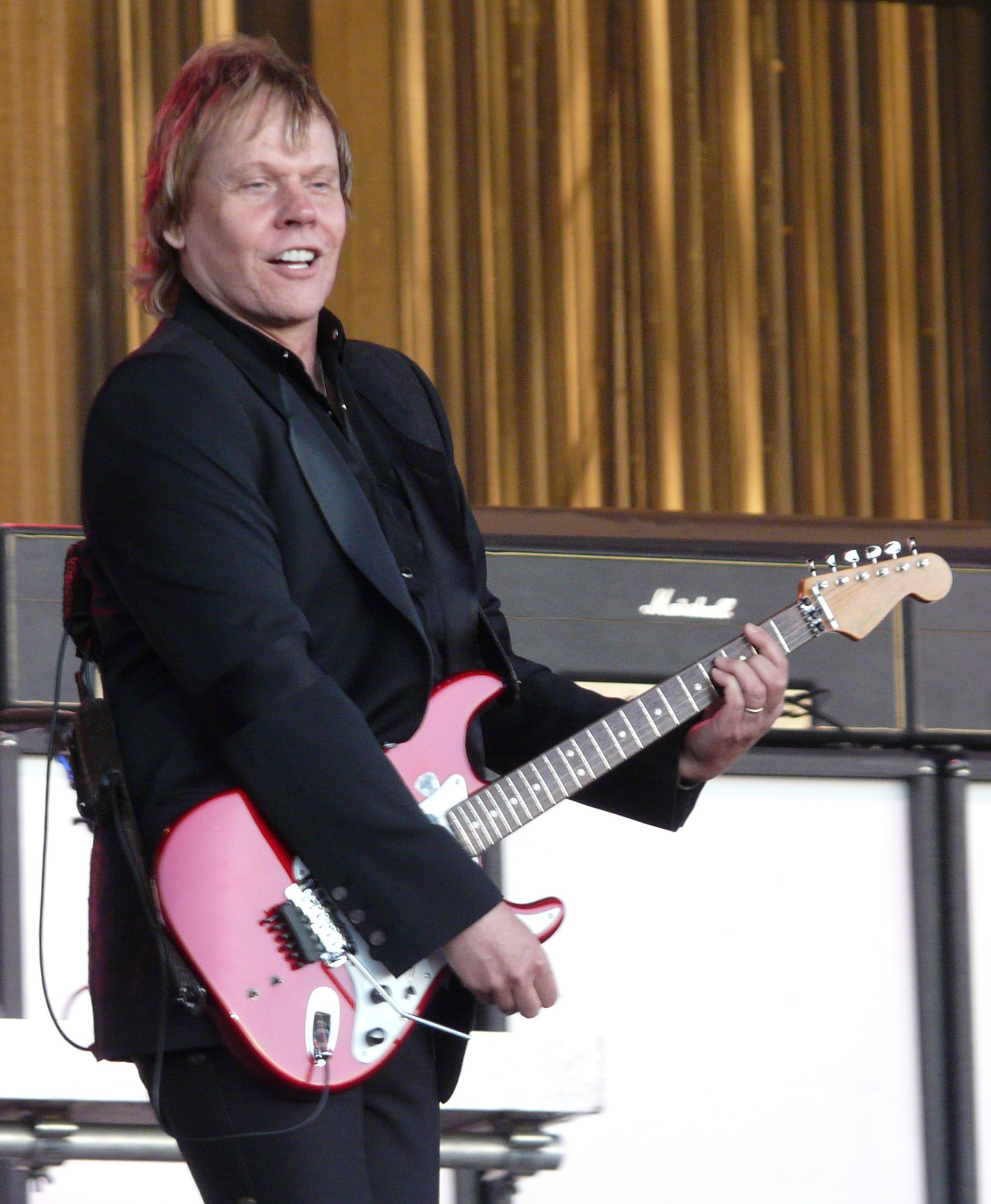
Young performing in 2008

=== Solo studio albums ===
- City Slicker (1985), with Jan Hammer
- Out on a Day Pass (1988)
- Raised by Wolves (1995), with James Young Group

=== As guest ===
- Jim Peterik, Don't Fight the Feeling (1976)
- Tommy Shaw, Ambition (1987)
- Enuff Z'Nuff, Paraphernalia (1998)
- Enuff Z'nuff, Clowns Lounge (2016) (archival)
