= Styx discography =

Cataloging of published recordings by Styx

- Studio albums: 18
- Extended plays: 3
- Live albums: 9
- Compilation albums: 16
- Singles: 41

This is the discography of American rock band Styx. Over the years they have released 18 studio albums, 9 live albums, 16 compilation albums, 41 singles, and 3 extended plays. 16 singles have hit the top 40 of the U.S. Billboard Hot 100 and 8 have hit the top 10.

== Studio albums ==
| Year | Album details | Peak chart positions | | | | | | | | Certifications (sales threshold) |
| Year | Album details | US | AUS | NZ | GER | NLD | NOR | SWE | UK | Certifications (sales threshold) |
|---|---|---|---|---|---|---|---|---|---|---|
| 1972 | Styx: Release date: August 31, 1972; Label: Wooden Nickel Records | 207 (Note: Styx did not enter the Billboard 200, but peaked at number 207 on the "Bubbling Under" the Top LPs chart.) | — | — | — | — | — | — | — | |
| 1973 | Styx II: Release date: July 1973; Label: Wooden Nickel Records | 20 | — | — | — | — | — | — | — | US: Gold |
| 1973 | The Serpent Is Rising: Release date: October 1973; Label: Wooden Nickel Records | 192 | — | — | — | — | — | — | — | |
| 1974 | Man of Miracles: Release date: October 1974; Label: Wooden Nickel Records | 154 | — | — | — | — | — | — | — | |
| 1975 | Equinox: Release date: December 1975; Label: A&M Records | 58 | — | — | — | — | — | — | — | US: Gold; CAN: Platinum |
| 1976 | Crystal Ball: Release date: October 1976; Label: A&M Records | 66 | — | — | — | — | — | — | — | US: Gold; CAN: Gold |
| 1977 | The Grand Illusion: Release date: July 7, 1977; Label: A&M Records | 6 | 49 | — | — | 49 | — | 38 | — | US: 3× Platinum; CAN: Platinum |
| 1978 | Pieces of Eight: Release date: September 1978; Label: A&M Records | 6 | 70 | — | — | 24 | — | 30 | — | US: 3× Platinum; CAN: Platinum |
| 1979 | Cornerstone: Release date: October 1979; Label: A&M Records | 2 | 21 | 14 | 6 | 27 | 25 | — | 36 | US: 2× Platinum; CAN: Platinum; GER: Gold |
| 1981 | Paradise Theatre: Release date: January 16, 1981; Label: A&M Records | 1 | 27 | 30 | 21 | 23 | 5 | 6 | 8 | US: 3× Platinum; UK: Silver; CAN: Platinum |
| 1983 | Kilroy Was Here: Release date: February 22, 1983; Label: A&M Records | 3 | 45 | — | 7 | 38 | 3 | 6 | 67 | US: Platinum; CAN: Platinum |
| 1990 | Edge of the Century: Release date: October 9, 1990; Label: A&M Records | 63 | — | — | — | — | — | — | — | US: Gold |
| 1999 | Brave New World: Release date: June 29, 1999; Label: CMC International | 175 | — | — | — | — | — | — | — | |
| 2003 | Cyclorama: Release date: February 18, 2003; Label: Sanctuary Records | 127 | — | — | — | — | — | — | — | |
| 2005 | Big Bang Theory: Release date: May 10, 2005; Label: New Door Records | 46 | — | — | — | — | — | — | | |
| 2017 | The Mission: Release date: June 16, 2017; Label: Universal Music Enterprises | 45 | — | — | 49 | — | — | — | — | |
| 2021 | Crash of the Crown: Release date: June 18, 2021; Label: Universal Music Enterprises | 114 | — | — | 26 | — | — | — | — | |
| 2025 | Circling from Above: Release date: July 18, 2025; Label: Universal Music Enterprises | — | — | — | 46 | — | — | — | — | |
"—" denotes releases that did not chart

== Live albums ==
| Year | Title | Peak positions | | Certifications |
| Year | Title | US | UK | Certifications |
|---|---|---|---|---|
| 1984 | Caught in the Act | 31 | 44 | |
| 1997 | Return to Paradise | 139 | — | US: Gold |
| 2000 | Arch Allies: Live at Riverport | — | — | |
| 2001 | Styx World: Live 2001 | — | — | |
| 2002 | At the River's Edge: Live in St. Louis | — | — | |
| 2003 | 21st Century Live | — | — | |
| 2006 | One with Everything: Styx and the Contemporary Youth Orchestra | — | — | |
| 2012 | The Grand Illusion/Pieces of Eight - Live | — | — | |
| 2015 | Live at the Orleans Arena, Las Vegas | — | — | |
"—" denotes releases that did not chart

== Compilation albums ==
| Year | Title | Peak positions | Certifications |
| Year | Title | US | Certifications |
|---|---|---|---|
| 1977 | Best of Styx | — | US: Gold; CAN: Platinum |
| 1980 | Lady | — | |
| 1987 | Styx Classics Volume 15 | — | US: Gold |
| 1991 | Styx Radio-Made Hits 1975–1991 | — | |
| 1992 | Greatest Hits | — | CAN: Platinum |
| 1995 | Styx Greatest Hits | 138 | US: 2× Platinum |
| 1996 | Styx Greatest Hits Part 2 | — | |
| 1997 | The Best of Times: The Best of Styx | — | |
| 1999 | Best of Styx 1973–1974 | — | |
| 2000 | Extended Versions | — | |
| 2000 | The Singles Collection | — | |
| 2001 | Styx Yesterday & Today | — | |
| 2002 | 20th Century Masters | — | |
| 2003 | Rockers | — | |
| 2004 | Come Sail Away - The Styx Anthology | 136 | |
| 2005 | The Complete Wooden Nickel Recordings | — | |
| 2010 | Icon 2 | — | |
| 2011 | Babe The Collection | — | |

== Extended plays ==
| Year | Title |
|---|---|
| 2010 | Regeneration: Volume 1: Release date: October 14, 2010; Label: Eagle Records |
| 2011 | Regeneration: Volume 2: Release date: 2011; Label: Eagle Records |
| 2021 | The Same Stardust: Release date: June 12, 2021; Label: UME |

== Singles ==
| Year | Single | Peak chart positions | | | | | | | | | | Certifications (sales threshold) | Album |
| Year | Single | US | US Main | US AC | GER | NL | AUS | NZ | JPN | UK | CAN | Certifications (sales threshold) | Album |
|---|---|---|---|---|---|---|---|---|---|---|---|---|---|
| 1972 | "Best Thing" | 82 | — | — | — | — | — | — | — | — | — | | Styx |
| 1973 | "Lady" | 6 | — | — | — | — | 23 | 17 | — | — | 19 | | Styx II |
| 1975 | "You Need Love" | 88 | — | — | — | — | — | — | — | — | — | | Styx II |
| 1976 | "Lorelei" | 27 | — | — | — | — | — | — | — | — | 6 | | Equinox |
| 1976 | "Light Up" | — | — | — | — | — | — | — | — | — | — | | Equinox |
| 1976 | "Mademoiselle" | 36 | — | — | — | — | — | — | — | — | 25 | | Crystal Ball |
| 1977 | "Jennifer" | — | — | — | — | — | — | — | — | — | — | | Crystal Ball |
| 1977 | "Crystal Ball" | — (Note: Crystal Ball did not enter the Billboard Hot 100, but peaked at number 109 on the Bubbling Under the Hot 100 chart.) | — | — | — | — | — | — | — | — | — | | Crystal Ball |
| 1977 | "Come Sail Away" | 8 | — | — | — | — | — | — | — | — | 9 | | The Grand Illusion |
| 1978 | "Fooling Yourself (The Angry Young Man)" | 29 | — | — | — | 28 | 42 | — | — | — | 20 | | The Grand Illusion |
| 1978 | "Blue Collar Man (Long Nights)" | 21 | — | — | — | 47 | 98 | — | — | — | 9 | | Pieces of Eight |
| 1978 | "Sing for the Day" | 41 | — | — | — | 18 | — | — | — | — | 27 | | Pieces of Eight |
| 1979 | "Renegade" | 16 | — | — | — | — | — | — | — | — | 10 | | Pieces of Eight |
| 1979 | "Babe" | 1 | — | 9 | — | 11 | 3 | 3 | — | 6 | 1 | CAN: Gold; UK: Silver; US: Gold | Cornerstone |
| 1980 | "Why Me" | 26 | — | — | — | — | — | — | — | — | 10 | | Cornerstone |
| 1980 | "Boat on the River" | — | — | — | 5 | 29 | — | — | — | — | — | | Cornerstone |
| 1980 | "Borrowed Time" | 64 | — | — | — | — | — | — | — | — | 76 | | Cornerstone |
| 1980 | "Lights" | — | — | — | 35 | — | — | — | — | — | — | | Cornerstone |
| 1981 | "The Best of Times" | 3 | 16 | 26 | 52 | — | 23 | 26 | — | 42 | 1 | | Paradise Theatre |
| 1981 | "Too Much Time on My Hands" | 9 | 2 | — | — | — | 68 | — | — | — | 4 | | Paradise Theatre |
| 1981 | "Snowblind" [airplay] | — | 22 | — | — | — | — | — | — | — | — | | Paradise Theatre |
| 1981 | "Nothing Ever Goes as Planned" | 54 | — | — | — | — | — | — | — | — | 12 | | Paradise Theatre |
| 1981 | "Rockin' the Paradise" | — | 8 | — | — | — | — | — | — | — | — | | Paradise Theatre |
| 1983 | "Mr. Roboto" | 3 | 3 | — | 8 | — | 40 | — | 29 | 90 | 1 | CAN: Gold; US: Gold | Kilroy Was Here |
| 1983 | "Don't Let It End" | 6 | — | 13 | 70 | — | — | — | — | 56 | 15 | | Kilroy Was Here |
| 1983 | "High Time" | 48 | — | — | — | — | — | — | — | — | — | | Kilroy Was Here |
| 1984 | "Music Time" | 40 | — | — | — | — | — | — | — | — | — | | Caught in the Act |
| 1990 | "Love Is the Ritual" | 80 | 9 | — | — | — | — | — | — | — | 59 | | Edge of the Century |
| 1990 | "Show Me the Way" | 3 | — | 3 | — | — | — | — | 9 | — | 4 | | Edge of the Century |
| 1991 | "Love at First Sight" | 25 | — | 13 | — | — | — | — | — | — | 18 | | Edge of the Century |
| 1997 | "Paradise" | — | — | 27 | — | — | — | — | — | — | — | | Return to Paradise |
| 1997 | "On My Way" | — | — | — | — | — | — | — | — | — | 83 | | Return to Paradise |
| 1999 | "Everything Is Cool" | — | — | — | — | — | — | — | — | — | — | | Brave New World |
| 2003 | "Waiting for Our Time" | — | 37 | — | — | — | — | — | — | — | — | | Cyclorama |
| 2003 | "I Am the Walrus" | — | — | — | — | — | — | — | — | — | — | | Big Bang Theory |
| 2009 | "Can't Stop Rockin'" (featuring REO Speedwagon) | — | — | — | — | — | — | — | — | — | — | | Non-album single |
| 2017 | "Gone Gone Gone" | — | — | — | — | — | — | — | — | — | — | | The Mission |
| 2021 | "Crash of the Crown" | — | — | — | — | — | — | — | — | — | — | | Crash of the Crown |
| 2021 | "Reveries" | — | — | — | — | — | — | — | — | — | — | | Crash of the Crown |
| 2025 | "Build and Destroy" | — | — | — | — | — | — | — | — | — | — | | Circling from Above |
| 2025 | "Forgive" | — | — | — | — | — | — | — | — | — | — | | Circling from Above |
"—" denotes releases that did not chart or were not released to that country

== Music videos ==
List of music videos
| Year | Title |
|---|---|
| 1977 | "Come Sail Away" |
| 1977 | "Fooling Yourself (The Angry Young Man)" |
| 1978 | "Blue Collar Man (Long Nights)" |
| 1978 | "Sing For The Day" |
| 1979 | "Borrowed Time" |
| 1979 | "Boat On The River" |
| 1979 | "Babe" |
| 1981 | "The Best Of Times" |
| 1981 | "Too Much Time On My Hands" |
| 1981 | "Rockin In Paradise" |
| 1983 | "Mr Roboto" |
| 1983 | "Don't Let It End" |
| 1984 | Heavy Metal Poisoning" |
| 1984 | "Haven't We Been Here Before" |
| 1984 | "Music Time" |
| 1990 | "Show Me The Way" |
| 1990 | "Love Is The Ritual" |
| 1991 | "Love At First Sight" |
| 2009 | "Can't Stop Rockin' (Feat. REO Speedwagon)" |
| 2009 | "Can't Find My Way Home (album released in 2005)" |
| 2009 | "I Am Walrus (album released in 2005)" |
| 2017 | "Gone Gone Gone" |
| 2020 | "Brave New World (album released in 1999)" |
| 2020 | "These Are The Times (album released in 2003)" |
| 2025 | "Build & Destroy" |
| 2025 | "Forgive" |

== Lyrics videos ==
List of lyrics videos
| Title | Year |
|---|---|
| "Radio Silence" | 2017 |
| "Crash Of The Crown" | 2021 |
| "Reveries" | 2021 |
| "Save Us From Ourselves" | 2021 |
| "Sound The Alarms" | 2021 |
| "Build & Destroy" | 2025 |
