= Greatest Hits Part 2 =

Greatest hits album by Styx
- Released: June 11, 1996
- Recorded: 1975–1996
- Genres: Rock, progressive rock, hard rock, pop rock
- Length: 76:25
- Label: A&M
- Producers: Styx and Dennis DeYoung

Styx compilation chronology
Greatest Hits (1995)	Greatest Hits Part 2 (1996)	Lady (1998)

Professional ratings
Review scores
Source	Rating
Allmusic	3/5 stars
Entertainment Weekly	D
The Rolling Stone Album Guide	1/5 stars

Greatest Hits Part 2 is a 1996 compilation album by the rock band Styx and a follow-up to Greatest Hits, another compilation album released in 1995. The album features 14 previously released Styx songs as well as two new songs, "Little Suzie" and "It Takes Love". Major omissions that were not included on either Greatest Hits packages are 2 top 40 charted singles, "Why Me" (#27, 1980) and "Music Time" (#40, 1984).

== Track listing ==
No.	Title	Writer(s)	Original album	Length
1.	"A.D. 1928"	Dennis DeYoung	Paradise Theatre, 1981	1:07
2.	"Rockin' the Paradise"	DeYoung, James "J.Y." Young, Tommy Shaw	Paradise Theatre	3:34
3.	"Light Up"	DeYoung	Equinox, 1975	4:17
4.	"Sing for the Day"	Shaw	Pieces of Eight, 1978	4:57
5.	"First Time"	DeYoung	Cornerstone, 1979	4:23
6.	"Mademoiselle"	DeYoung, Shaw	Crystal Ball, 1976	3:55
7.	"Snowblind"	Young, DeYoung	Paradise Theatre	4:58
8.	"Boat on the River"	Shaw	Cornerstone	3:10
9.	"Borrowed Time"	DeYoung, Shaw	Cornerstone	4:58
10.	"Lights"	Shaw, DeYoung	Cornerstone	4:37
11.	"Queen of Spades"	Young, DeYoung	Pieces of Eight	5:38
12.	"Love at First Sight"	Glen Burtnik, DeYoung, Young	Edge of the Century, 1990	4:33
13.	"Haven't We Been Here Before"	DeYoung, Shaw	Kilroy Was Here, 1983	4:04
14.	"Superstars"	Young, DeYoung, Shaw	The Grand Illusion, 1977	3:59
15.	"Little Suzie"	Burtnik, Bob Burger, Shaw, DeYoung	New song, previously unissued	4:49
16.	"It Takes Love"	Burtnik, Burger	New song, previously unissued	3:26

== Personnel ==
- Dennis DeYoung - vocals, keyboards
- Tommy Shaw - vocals, guitar
- James "J.Y." Young - vocals, guitar
- John Curulewski - guitar ("Light Up")
- Chuck Panozzo - bass, vocals
- John Panozzo - drums (all tracks except "Little Suzie")
- Glen Burtnik - vocals, guitar ("Love at First Sight", "Little Suzie", "It Takes Love")
- Todd Sucherman - drums ("Little Suzie")
