= One with Everything: Styx and the Contemporary Youth Orchestra =

Live album by Styx
- Released: November 14, 2006
- Recorded: May 25, 2006
- Venue: Blossom Music Center (Cuyahoga Falls, Ohio)
- Genre: Rock/Pop
- Label: Frontiers

Styx compilation chronology
The Complete Wooden Nickel Recordings (2005)	One with Everything: Styx and the Contemporary Youth Orchestra (2006)

Professional ratings
Review scores
Source	Rating
About.com	5/5 stars
Allmusic	3/5 stars
The Daily Vault	D
Melodic.net	3/5 stars
Rolling Stone	2/5 stars

One with Everything is a live album and concert video by the rock band Styx, which was recorded and professionally filmed in Cleveland, Ohio during their 2006 tour. The band played with the Contemporary Youth Orchestra, playing a set of 16 songs, including three songs from their 2005 studio album Big Bang Theory. Both an album and a DVD were released, with the Blu-ray Disc on April 29, 2009. As with many of the live releases post-Dennis DeYoung, this album does not contain any Dennis DeYoung penned or sung songs.

== CD release ==
The CD contains 13 songs, including two new songs, "Just Be", which is a studio recording, and "Everything All the Time", which is performed live.

=== CD track listing ===
1. "Blue Collar Man (Long Nights)" (Shaw)
2. "One with Everything" (Burtnik, Gowan, Shaw, Sucherman, Young)
3. "It Don't Make Sense (You Can't Make Peace)" (Dixon)
4. "I Am the Walrus" (Lennon–McCartney)
5. "Just Be" (Studio Version) (Gowan, Phillips, Shaw, Sucherman, Young)
6. "Fooling Yourself (The Angry Young Man)" (Shaw)
7. "A Criminal Mind" (Gowan)
8. "Everything All the Time" (Gowan, Phillips, Shaw, Sucherman, Young)
9. "Too Much Time on My Hands" (Shaw)
10. "Crystal Ball" (Shaw)
11. "Miss America" (Young)
12. "Boat on the River" (Shaw)
13. "Renegade" (Shaw)

== DVD release ==
=== Region 1 DVD track listing ===
1. "Blue Collar Man (Long Nights)"
2. "Lorelei"
3. "One With Everything"
4. "It Don't Make Sense (You Can't Make Peace)"
5. "I Am the Walrus"
6. "Just Be"
7. "Everything All the Time"
8. "Crystal Ball"
9. "Miss America"
10. "A Criminal Mind"
11. "Too Much Time On My Hands"
12. "Boat on the River"
13. "I Don't Need No Doctor"
14. Medley: "Put Me On/Mademoiselle/Heavy Metal Poisoning/Midnight Ride/Sing for the Day/Shooz/Queen of Spades/Great White Hope/Half-Penny, Two-Penny/Borrowed Time/Superstars/Rockin' the Paradise/Lights/Man in the Wilderness/Put Me On (Reprise)/The Grand Finale/Mr. Roboto"
15. "Fooling Yourself (The Angry Young Man)"
16. "Renegade"
17. "Finale"

=== Region 2 DVD track listing ===
1. "Blue Collar Man (Long Nights)"
2. "Lorelei"
3. "One With Everything"
4. "It Don't Make Sense (You Can't Make Peace)"
5. "Can't Find My Way Home"
6. "I Am the Walrus"
7. "Just Be"
8. "Everything All the Time"
9. "Crystal Ball"
10. "Miss America"
11. "A Criminal Mind"
12. "Too Much Time On My Hands"
13. "Boat on the River"
14. "I Don't Need No Doctor"
15. Medley: "Put Me On" / "Mademoiselle" / "Heavy Metal Poisoning" / "Midnight Ride" / "Sing for the Day" / "Shooz" / "Queen of Spades" / "Great White Hope" / "Half Penny Two Penny" / "Borrowed Time" / "Superstars" / "Rockin' the Paradise" / "Lights" / "Man in the Wilderness" / "Put Me On (Reprise)" / "The Grand Finale"
16. "Fooling Yourself (The Angry Young Man)"
17. "Renegade/Finale"

=== Bonus Christmas Songs ===
1. "All I Want"
2. "Ring the Bells"

== Personnel ==
- Tommy Shaw - guitar, mandolin, vocals
- James Young - guitar, vocals
- Lawrence Gowan - keyboards, vocals
- Ricky Phillips - bass, backing vocals
- Chuck Panozzo - bass
- Todd Sucherman - drums
- Liza Grossman - conductor
- Contemporary Youth Orchestra
