= Caught in the Act (Styx album) =

1984 live album by Styx

Live album by Styx
- Released: April 2, 1984
- Recorded: April 9–10, 1983; January 1984
- Venue: Saenger Theater (New Orleans, LA)
- Studios: Pumpkin Studios (Oak Lawn, IL)
- Genre: Rock
- Length: 83:30
- Label: A&M
- Producer: Styx

Styx chronology
Kilroy Was Here (1983)	Caught in the Act (1984)	Edge of the Century (1990)

Caught in the Act

Video by Styx
- Released: 1984
- Recorded: April 9–10, 1983
- Venue: Saenger Theater (New Orleans, LA)
- Genre: Rock
- Label: A&M
- Directors: Jerry Kramer, Brian Gibson
- Producer: Jerry Kramer

Styx chronology
Caught in the Act (1984)	Return to Paradise (1997)

Professional ratings
Review scores
Source	Rating
AllMusic	1.5/5 stars
Kerrang!	(unfavorable)
The Rolling Stone Album Guide	2/5 stars

Caught in the Act is a live double album by the American rock band Styx, released in 1984. It contains one new song, "Music Time," which was released as a single, reaching #40 on the Billboard Hot 100 charts.

Caught in the Act is also the name of a VHS video recording that featured the band acting out the concept established in their Kilroy Was Here album. A DVD version was released on December 11, 2007.

Shortly after this album's release, Tommy Shaw announced his departure from the band to pursue a solo career. The band then went into hiatus for the rest of the 1980s. Caught in the Act would ultimately prove to be the final album by the 1975-84 Styx lineup of Dennis DeYoung, Shaw, James Young, Chuck Panozzo, and John Panozzo. By the time Shaw returned to the band in 1995, John Panozzo's declining health prevented his participation, and he died in 1996.

== Track listing ==
=== Side 1 ===
1. "Music Time" [*] (DeYoung) – 4:45
  - Lead vocals: Dennis DeYoung
  - Lead guitar: Tommy Shaw
2. "Mr. Roboto" (DeYoung) – 4:59
  - Lead vocals: Dennis DeYoung
3. "Too Much Time on My Hands" (Shaw) – 5:01
  - Lead vocals and lead guitar: Tommy Shaw
4. "Babe" (DeYoung) – 4:52
  - Lead vocals: Dennis DeYoung
  - Lead guitar: Tommy Shaw

=== Side 2 ===
5. "Snowblind" (Young, DeYoung) – 6:00
  - Co-lead vocals and lead guitar: James "JY" Young
  - Co-lead vocals: Tommy Shaw
6. "State Street Sadie" (uncredited) / "The Best of Times" (DeYoung) – 6:30
  - Lead vocals: Dennis DeYoung
  - Lead guitar: Tommy Shaw
7. "Suite Madame Blue" (DeYoung) – 8:51
  - Lead vocals and synthesizer solo: Dennis DeYoung
  - Lead guitar: James "JY" Young

=== Side 3 ===
8. "Rockin' the Paradise" (DeYoung, Young, Shaw) – 4:40
  - Lead vocals: Dennis DeYoung
  - First guitar solo: Tommy Shaw
  - Second guitar solo: James "JY" Young
9. "Blue Collar Man (Long Nights)" (Shaw) – 4:47
  - Lead vocals and lead guitar: Tommy Shaw
  - Guitar fills and end solo: James "JY" Young
10. "Miss America" (Young) – 6:15
  - Lead vocals and lead guitar: James "JY" Young
11. "Don't Let It End" (DeYoung) – 5:25 (on US LP, cassette and CD)
  - Lead vocals: Dennis DeYoung
  - Lead guitar: Tommy Shaw
11. "Boat on the River" (Shaw) – 3:10 (A&M Records 1984)
  - Accordion: Dennis DeYoung
  - Lead vocals, lead guitar, mandolin: Tommy Shaw

=== Side 4 ===
12. "Fooling Yourself (The Angry Young Man)" (Shaw) – 6:05
  - Lead vocals: Tommy Shaw
  - Synthesizer solos: Dennis DeYoung
13. "Crystal Ball" (Shaw) – 6:24
  - Lead vocals and lead guitar: Tommy Shaw
  - Synthesizer solo: Dennis DeYoung
14. "Come Sail Away" (DeYoung) – 8:56
  - Lead vocals, synthesizer solo: Dennis DeYoung
  - Lead guitar: Tommy Shaw

* New studio recording

== Video track listing ==
1. Kilroy Was Here mini-movie
2. "Mr. Roboto" (DeYoung)
3. "Rockin' the Paradise (with J.Y. guitar solo)" (DeYoung, Shaw, Young)
4. "Blue Collar Man" (Shaw)
5. "Snowblind" (DeYoung, Young)
6. "Too Much Time on My Hands" (Shaw)
7. "Don't Let It End" (DeYoung)
8. "Heavy Metal Poisoning" (Young)
9. "Cold War (with extended Tommy Shaw guitar solo and extra verses)" (Shaw)
10. "State Street Sadie" (uncredited) / "The Best of Times" (DeYoung)
11. "Come Sail Away" (DeYoung)
12. "Renegade (with John Panozzo drum solo and band getting arrested)" (Shaw)
13. "Haven't We Been Here Before" (Shaw)
14. "Don't Let It End (Reprise)" (DeYoung)

== DVD bonus tracks ==
1. "Come Sail Away" (1977 video)
2. "Borrowed Time" (1979 video)
3. "Babe" (1979 video)
4. "Boat On the River" (1979 video)
5. "A.D. 1928"/"Rockin' the Paradise" (1981 video)
6. "The Best of Times" (1981 video)
7. "Too Much Time on My Hands" (1981 video)
8. "Mr. Roboto" (1983 video)
9. "Don't Let It End" (1983 video)
10. "Heavy Metal Poisoning" (1983 video)
11. "Haven't We Been Here Before" (video)
12. "Music Time" (1984 video)

== Personnel ==
- Dennis DeYoung – vocals, keyboards, accordion
- Tommy Shaw – vocals, guitars, mandolin
- James "JY" Young – vocals, guitars, keyboards
- Chuck Panozzo – bass
- John Panozzo – drums

== Production (album) ==
- Producer: Styx
- Engineers: Gary Loizzo, Will Rascati, Rob Kingsland, Biff Dawes
- Recorded with Westwood One Mobile at Saenger Theater, New Orleans in April, 1983 except "Music Time" which was recorded at Pumpkin Studios in January, 1984
- Overdubs and mixing at Pumpkin Studios, Oak Lawn, Illinois
- Assistant engineer: Jim Popko
- Mastering engineer: Ted Jensen at Sterling Sound, NYC

== Production (video) ==
- Concert producer and director: Jerry Kramer
- Kilroy Was Here mini-movie director: Brian Gibson
- Cameramen: Wayne Isham

== Charts ==
Chart (1984)	Peak position
Canada Top Albums/CDs (RPM)	52
German Albums (Offizielle Top 100)	55
UK Albums (Official Charts)	44
US Billboard 200	31
