= Rockers (Styx album) =

Compilation album by Styx
- Released: August 26, 2003
- Recorded: 1975–1996
- Genre: Rock
- Label: A&M

Styx compilation chronology
20th Century Masters: The Millennium Collection (2002)	Rockers (2003)	21st Century Live (2003)

Professional ratings
Review scores
Source	Rating
AllMusic	3/5 stars

Rockers is a compilation of songs by the band Styx. It was released in 2003. The album is notable for deliberately omitting any songs for which former member Dennis DeYoung was the primary or sole writer; even DeYoung-penned signature ballad-to-rocker hits such as "Queen of Spades", "Suite Madame Blue", and "Rockin' the Paradise" are missing. It was an attempt by the remaining members of the band to reposition Styx as a hard rock band and move away from the DeYoungian ballads that had marked the last few albums of their career and most of their biggest hit singles. Ironically, some of the Tommy Shaw songs on the album such as "Crystal Ball" and "Man in the Wilderness" are classic Tommy Shaw acoustic-based folk rock that only turn heavier in their back half. Other songs are more straight forward rockers.

Instead of the famous angular "Styx" logo (used for most albums in some form since 1977), this collection re-introduces the curved logo from their first four albums and not used since 1974's Man of Miracles. Originally it was rumored that the album would include the extended version of "Man in the Wilderness," but the original version was included instead. The previously unreleased full length version eventually appeared the following year on the Come Sail Away: the Styx Anthology release.

== Track listing ==
1. "Midnight Ride" (James Young) – 4:18
2. "Shooz" (Tommy Shaw, J. Young) – 4:44
3. "Crystal Ball" (T. Shaw) – 4:26
4. "Miss America" (J. Young) – 5:01
5. "Man in the Wilderness" (T. Shaw) – 5:47
6. "Blue Collar Man (Long Nights)" (T. Shaw) – 4:03
7. "Renegade" (T. Shaw) – 4:13
8. "Snowblind" (J. Young, Dennis DeYoung) – 4:58
9. "Heavy Metal Poisoning" (J. Young) – 4:54
10. "Love Is the Ritual" (Glen Burtnik, Plinky) – 3:48
11. "Little Suzie" (G. Burtnik, Bob Berger, T. Shaw, D. DeYoung) – 4:49

== Personnel ==
- Dennis DeYoung - Keyboards, Vocals
- Tommy Shaw - Guitar, Vocals (Tracks 2–9, 11)
- James "J.Y." Young - Guitar, Vocals
- Chuck Panozzo - Bass Guitar
- John Panozzo - Drums (Tracks 1–10)
- John Curulewski - Guitars, Vocals (Track 1)
- Glen Burtnik - Guitars, Vocals (Track 10)
- Todd Sucherman - Drums (Track 11)
