= Extended Versions (Styx album) =

Compilation of live tracks recorded by the band Styx

Live album by Styx
- Released: 2000
- Recorded: 1997
- Genre: Rock/Pop
- Label: A&M

Styx compilation chronology
| Styx Greatest Hits Part 2 (1996) | Extended Versions (2000) | Arch Allies: Live at Riverport (2000) |

Professional ratings
Review scores
| Source | Rating |
|---|---|
| AllMusic | 2.5/5 stars |

Extended Versions: The Encore Collection is a compilation of live tracks recorded by the band Styx. The album was released in 2000, but each track on the album had been released as part of Styx's 1997 double live album Return to Paradise.

== Track listing ==
1. "Blue Collar Man" (Shaw) – 4:34
2. "Lady" (DeYoung) – 3:28
3. "Fooling Yourself (The Angry Young Man)" (Shaw) – 5:54
4. "Renegade" (Shaw) – 6:01
5. "Show Me the Way" (DeYoung) – 5:11
6. "Lorelei" (DeYoung, Young) – 4:03
7. "Babe" (DeYoung) – 4:50
8. "Too Much Time on My Hands" (Shaw) – 5:43
9. "Come Sail Away" (DeYoung) – 8:33
10. "The Best of Times" (DeYoung) – 7:42
