= Styx Yesterday & Today =

Styx: Hits from Yesterday and Today

Compilation album by Styx
- Released: April 1, 2001
- Genre: Rock/Pop
- Label: BMG Special Products

Styx compilation chronology
Arch Allies: Live at Riverport (2000)	Styx: Hits from Yesterday and Today (2001)	Styx World: Live 2001 (2001)

Professional ratings
Review scores
Source	Rating
Allmusic	2/5 stars

Styx: Hits from Yesterday and Today: Recorded Live is a compilation album containing songs by the band Styx. It was released in 2001. It takes four songs from Styx's previous studio album, Brave New World and two of the three studio tracks from Styx's previous live double album, Return to Paradise, and combines them with four live tracks from the previously released Arch Allies: Live at Riverport.

== Track listing ==
1. "Number One" (Tommy Shaw) - 4:35
2. "Best New Face" (Jack Blades, T. Shaw) - 3:37
3. "Edge of the Century" (Glen Burtnik, Bob Berger) - 4:59
4. "Fooling Yourself (The Angry Young Man)" (T. Shaw) - 6:18
5. "On My Way" (T. Shaw) - 5:01
6. "Dear John" (T. Shaw) - 3:04
7. "The Grand Illusion" (D. DeYoung) - 5:33
8. "Too Much Time on My Hands" (T. Shaw) - 5:18
9. "Brave New World" (T. Shaw, James "J.Y." Young) - 5:14 (Incorrectly credited on the album as "What Have They Done To You (T. Shaw, J. Young)
10. "Everything Is Cool" (T. Shaw) - 7:49
11. Bonus Video: "Renegade" (T. Shaw) - 14:27

== Personnel ==
- Tommy Shaw: vocals, guitar, mandolin
- James "J.Y." Young: vocals, guitar, keyboards
- Lawrence Gowan: vocals, keyboards
- Glen Burtnik: vocals, bass, guitar
- Chuck Panozzo: bass
- Todd Sucherman: drums
- Dennis DeYoung: keyboards, vocals except for "Edge of the Century", "Fooling Yourself", "The Grand Illusion", "Too Much Time on My Hands", and "Renegade"
