= At the River's Edge: Live in St. Louis =

Live album by Styx
- Released: July 9, 2002 (US)
- Recorded: June 9, 2000, Riverport Amphitheater, St. Louis, Missouri, United States
- Genre: Rock
- Label: Sanctuary Records
- Producer: James Young; Gary Loizzo

Styx compilations chronology
Styx World: Live 2001 (2001)	At the River's Edge: Live in St. Louis (2002)	Rockers (2003)

At the River's Edge, by the rock band Styx is a single-disc version of Arch Allies: Live at Riverport, featuring only the Styx set, and including live versions of the tracks "Everything Is Cool" and "Lorelei" in place of the Jam versions of "Blue Collar Man" and "Roll with the Changes" that Styx performed with REO Speedwagon on that album.

== Track listing ==
1. "Everything Is Cool" (Tommy Shaw) - 4:55
2. "The Grand Illusion" - (Dennis DeYoung) 5:38
3. "Blue Collar Man (Long Nights)" (Shaw) - 4:58
4. "Lorelei" (James "J.Y." Young, DeYoung) - 4:09
5. "Fooling Yourself (The Angry Young Man)" (Shaw) - 6:18
6. "Lady" (DeYoung) - 4:48
7. "Brave New World" (Shaw, Young) - 5:41
8. "Edge of the Century" (Glen Burtnik, Bob Berger) - 5:06
9. "Heavy Water" (Young, Shaw) - 5:53
10. "Too Much Time on My Hands (Shaw) - 5:22
11. "Renegade" (Shaw) - 7:25

== Personnel ==
- Tommy Shaw
- James "J.Y." Young
- Lawrence Gowan
- Glen Burtnik
- Chuck Panozzo
- Todd Sucherman
