= Heavy Metal Poisoning =

Song by Styx

from the album Kilroy Was Here
- A-side: "Music Time"
- Released: 1984
- Recorded: 1982
- Genre: Hard rock
- Length: 4:57
- Label: A&M
- Songwriter: James Young

Music video
- "Heavy Metal Poisoning" on YouTube

"Heavy Metal Poisoning" is a song by American rock band Styx. It was included as the fifth track on their 1983 studio album Kilroy Was Here.

The song in the story of Kilroy Was Here has the character of Dr. Righteous (portrayed by James "J.Y." Young) preaching the "evils" of rock and roll. Although the song got only minor airplay on FM rock radio, its music video received significant airplay on MTV.

AllMusic critic Mike DeGagne considered it to be "pretentious, weakly composed, and rhythmically anemic."

It would be released as a B-side to the single "Music Time" (from the band's 1984 double live album Caught in the Act) in 1984.

== Backmasking ==
The song begins with the backmasked Latin words "annuit cœptis, novus ordo seclorum". Translated from the Latin, these words mean "He/God has favored our undertakings, a new order of the ages". These are the two mottoes on the reverse side of the Great Seal of the United States. If listened closely enough, just after the second refrain and instrumental break, another backmasked message can be heard, saying "Rock & roll is evil", mocking the purported dangers of backmasking. The backmaskings are thought to have been a response to claims of secret messages in previous songs by evangelical and conservative critics of rock music.

== Music video ==
The music video for the song was directed by Brian Gibson (alongside the videos for "Mr. Roboto" and "Don't Let It End"). The video has Dr. Righteous performing a sermon on The Dr. Righteous Show with his two henchmen (portrayed by the Panozzo twins) by his side. Interspersed is footage of people and members of The Majority for Musical Morality setting fire to guitars and records. On Righteous' TV show, Righteous brainwashes a youth who was inflicted with the "evils" of rock and roll which was almost thwarted when Jonathan Chance (played by Tommy Shaw) tried to save the youth only to escape from being arrested by the Majority of Musical Morality. While the Tommy Shaw character mimes the guitar solo, it is actually played by James "J.Y." Young. At the end of the clip, Righteous succeeds in "curing" a youth from the "evils" of rock and roll. Keyboardist and frontman Dennis DeYoung does not appear in the video—the only Styx video he does not appear in during his tenure with the group.

It is included on the Styx compilation album Rockers.

== Personnel ==
- James "J.Y." Young – lead vocals, lead guitar, guitar synthesizers
- Tommy Shaw – rhythm guitar, backing vocals
- Dennis DeYoung – keyboards, backing vocals
- Chuck Panozzo – bass guitar
- John Panozzo – drums
