= Paradise Theatre =

Paradise Theatre or Paradise Theater may refer to:

- Orchestra Hall (Detroit), known as the Paradise Theatre from 1941 to 1951
- Paradise Center for the Arts, a 1929 theater in Faribault, Minnesota, originally called the Paradise Theatre
- Paradise Theater (Bronx), a 1929 theater in the Bronx, New York, originally called Loew's Paradise Theatre
- Paradise Theatre (album), a 1981 concept album by the rock band Styx
- Paradise Theatre (Chicago), a demolished 1928 movie palace and inspiration for the album by Styx
- Paradise Theatre (Toronto), originally operated from 1937 to 2006, reopened in 2019
- The Paradise, a fictional theatre featured in the film Phantom of the Paradise
- The Paradise Rock Club, a music venue located in Boston, Massachusetts, formerly known as Paradise Theater.

== See also ==
- Paradise (disambiguation)
- Paradise Club (disambiguation)
