= Styx World: Live 2001 =

StyxWorld Live 2001

Live album by Styx
- Released: June 5, 2001
- Genre: Rock/Pop
- Length: 68:30
- Label: CMC International
- Producer: James "J.Y." Young; Gary Loizzo

Styx compilation chronology
Arch Allies: Live at Riverport (2001)	StyxWorld Live 2001 (2001)	At the River's Edge: Live in St. Louis (2002)

Professional ratings
Review scores
Source	Rating
Allmusic	1.5/5 stars
The Daily Vault	C−
The Rolling Stone Album Guide	1/5 stars

StyxWorld Live 2001 is a live album by the band Styx released in 2001. It is drawn from performances at the Kosei Nenken Hall, Tokyo, Japan, February 10–11, 2000, Stadthalle, Offenbach, Germany, October 27, 2000, and the Shaw Center, Edmonton, Alberta, Canada, February 11, 2001.

== Track listing ==
1. "Rockin' the Paradise" (James "J.Y." Young, Tommy Shaw, Dennis DeYoung) - 4:12
2. "High Enough" (T. Shaw, Jack Blades, Ted Nugent) - 2:07
3. "Lorelei" (J. Young, D. DeYoung) - 4:07
4. "A Criminal Mind" (Lawrence Gowan) - 5:59 +
5. "Love Is the Ritual" (Glen Burtnik, Plinky) - 5:31
6. "Boat on the River" (T. Shaw) - 4:25
7. "Half-Penny, Two-Penny" (J. Young, Ray Brandle) - 6:35
8. "Sing for the Day" (T. Shaw) - 4:22
9. "Snowblind" (J. Young, D. DeYoung) - 5:22
10. "Sometimes Love Just Ain't Enough" (G. Burtnik, Patty Smyth) - 2:45
11. "Crystal Ball" (T. Shaw) - 6:28
12. "Miss America" (J. Young) - 6:19
13. "Come Sail Away" (D. DeYoung) - 10:11

+ Produced by Lawrence Gowan

== Personnel ==
- Tommy Shaw: Vocals, Electric & Acoustic Guitar, Mandolin
- James "J.Y." Young: Vocals, Electric & Acoustic Guitar, Keyboards
- Lawrence Gowan: Vocals, Keyboards
- Glen Burtnik: Vocals, Bass, Electric Guitar
- Chuck Panozzo: Bass
- Todd Sucherman: Drums
