= Live 2001 =

2001 Live may refer to:

- NBA Live 2001
- Styx World: Live 2001
