= Music Time (song) =

Single by Styx

from the album Caught in the Act
- B-side: "Heavy Metal Poisoning"
- Released: April 1984
- Recorded: January 1984
- Genre: New wave
- Length: 4:45
- Label: A&M
- Songwriter(s): Dennis DeYoung
- Producer(s): Styx

Styx singles chronology
"High Time" (1983)	"Music Time" (1984)	"Love Is the Ritual" (1990)

"Music Time" is the sole studio track released on the live Styx album, Caught in the Act. It peaked at number 40 on the US Billboard Hot 100 chart the week of June 2, 1984.

When the concert was released on DVD, the music video for this song was included. The theme is cartoonish and cheerful, with bright pastel sets and oversized props. The video features singer/songwriter Dennis DeYoung in various costumes (including a classic hobo look, and a fast food uniform), singing and acting out the lyrics. ("My job is boring," he sings, as he pulls the switch on a condemned man in the electric chair, "I'm overworked and underpaid.") The opening and closing scenes show aliens watching the main body of the video, and singing a refrain of "Hey everybody, it's music time!"

The track was added to the album in order to fulfill a final contractual obligation, with the band breaking up by the time of its release. Styx singer/guitarist Tommy Shaw made no secret of his dislike of the song, and by the time the video was complete, Shaw had left the band. This is why most of the scenes appear to depict a four-man group, and why Shaw is only shown from the torso. Shaw wanted to be filmed separately from the others, in New York (where he was working on his first solo album), while the rest of the production was filmed in Los Angeles. He refused to participate in one comedic scene in a restaurant, in which each band member's head appeared on dinner plates and in salad bowls.

"I must have come off as a real dope," said Shaw, "because they were saying 'Just let us shoot it, just so that we can say that we did, but we won't use it', and I was like, 'Hello? I don't think so.' [...] It was kind of childish, but that's how it is in a band." Shaw's most prominent appearance in the video occurs near the end, where the rest of the band is shown together in winter garb, jumping up and down waving, and then Shaw is shown separately, facing the other way and doing the same thing back.

Although Styx would hit the singles chart again with 1990's "Show Me the Way" and "Love at First Sight", "Music Time", to date, was the last Styx Billboard Top 40 hit featuring the Styx songwriting core of DeYoung, Shaw, and James "J.Y." Young. The song was also the final recording by the massively successful 1975–1984 Styx lineup of DeYoung, Shaw, Young, and both Panozzo twins; by the time Shaw returned to the band in 1995, John Panozzo's declining health prevented his participation.

== Reception ==
Muriel Gray at Smash Hits called it a, "Cheery, neatly constructed single that's reminiscent of Devo but not quite as good. The best thing is the daft lyrical content."

== Personnel ==
- Dennis DeYoung – lead vocals, keyboards
- Tommy Shaw – lead guitar, backing vocals
- James Young – rhythm guitar, backing vocals
- Chuck Panozzo – bass
- John Panozzo – drums
