= List of Canadian number-one albums of 1980 =

These are the Canadian number-one albums of 1980 as compiled by RPM.

(Beginning with the missing publication on September 20, RPM published every other week until the end of the year, resuming regular weekly publications on January 24, 1981. Issues from the point of alternation bear consecutive identification numbers, September 13 being Vol 33, No. 25, followed by September 27 as Vol. 33, No. 26, October 11 as Vol. 34, No. 1, culminating in the December 20 issue, as Vol. 34, No. 6. with January 24, 1981 as Vol. 34, No. 7.) Beginning December 6, the list of Top RPM 100 albums was reduced to 50.

Issue date	Album	Artist
January 5	In Through the Out Door	Led Zeppelin
January 12	The Long Run	Eagles
January 19	The Long Run	Eagles
January 26	The Long Run	Eagles
February 2	Cornerstone	Styx
February 9	The Wall	Pink Floyd
February 16	The Wall	Pink Floyd
February 23	The Wall	Pink Floyd
March 1	The Wall	Pink Floyd
March 8	Kenny	Kenny Rogers
March 15	The Wall	Pink Floyd
March 22	The Wall	Pink Floyd
March 29	The Wall	Pink Floyd
April 5	The Wall	Pink Floyd
April 12	The Wall	Pink Floyd
April 19	The Wall	Pink Floyd
April 26	The Wall	Pink Floyd
May 3	The Wall	Pink Floyd
May 10	The Wall	Pink Floyd
May 17	Glass Houses	Billy Joel
May 24	Glass Houses	Billy Joel
May 31	Against the Wind	Bob Seger
June 7	Against the Wind	Bob Seger
June 14	Against the Wind	Bob Seger
June 21	Duke	Genesis
June 28	Duke	Genesis
July 5	Duke	Genesis
July 12	Glass Houses	Billy Joel
July 19	Glass Houses	Billy Joel
July 26	Glass Houses	Billy Joel
August 2	Glass Houses	Billy Joel
August 9	Glass Houses	Billy Joel
August 16	Emotional Rescue	The Rolling Stones
August 23	Emotional Rescue	The Rolling Stones
August 30	Emotional Rescue	The Rolling Stones
September 6	Emotional Rescue	The Rolling Stones
September 13	Emotional Rescue	The Rolling Stones
September 20	Emotional Rescue	The Rolling Stones
September 27	Emotional Rescue	The Rolling Stones
October 4	Emotional Rescue	The Rolling Stones
October 11	The Game	Queen
October 18	The Game	Queen
October 25	The Game	Queen
November 1	The Game	Queen
November 8	The Game	Queen
November 15	The Game	Queen
November 22	The Game	Queen
November 29	The Game	Queen
December 5	The Game	Queen
December 12	The Game	Queen
December 20	The River	Bruce Springsteen
December 27	The River	Bruce Springsteen

== See also ==
- List of Canadian number-one singles of 1980
