= Borrowed Time (Styx song) =

Single by Styx

from the album Cornerstone
- B-side: "Eddie"
- Released: March 1980
- Genre: Rock
- Length: 4:58
- Label: A&M
- Songwriter(s): Dennis DeYoung; Tommy Shaw
- Producer(s): Styx

Styx singles chronology
"Boat on the River" (1980)	"Borrowed Time" (1980)	"Lights" (1980)

"Borrowed Time" is a song written by Dennis DeYoung and Tommy Shaw that was first released on Styx's 1979 album Cornerstone and was also released as the third single from Cornerstone. It peaked at No. 64 on the U.S. chart in April 1980.

The band opened their concerts with this song on their 1979-1980 tour in support of Cornerstone. It would also serve as an encore on the band's 1981-1982 Paradise Theatre tour.

According to DeYoung, the theme of the song is "America in trouble." News Record writer Rex Rutkoski said that the song "examines an America living on "Borrowed Time," wearing blinders to the possibility of its own decline.

Cash Box said that it has a "hard rock attack, "fiery lead guitar work" and "crack harmonies." Billboard said that it "rocks out harder" than the previous singles from the album, "Babe" and "Why Me", and that the "fiery lead vocal and matching guitar riffs spark the track." Record World said that "Slashing guitars and raucous vocals ride a breakneck pace to the top of AOR-pop."

Sacramento Bee contributor Andy Sechor contrasted the song's "strident notes" with the "acoustic tenderness" of "Babe". Canadian Press critic Michael Lawson found the song to be "less appealing" than the softer songs on Cornerstone, calling it a "heavier number spitting out the anger of '60s youth."

Ultimate Classic Rock critic Sterling Whitaker rated "Borrowed Time" as DeYoung's 2nd best "song that rocks," saying that despite soft rock songs like "Babe" it "showed he was still interested in harder-edged material." Whitaker also pointed out that the line about America "living high, living fine / Living high on borrowed time" was "a prediction which proved sadly accurate."

Music critic Conrad Bibens rated "Borrowed Time" as one of the 2 best songs on Cornerstone (along with "First Time"), saying that DeYoung has "returned to his lyrical stance on The Grand Illusion, an awareness of others' problems and the knowledge that "fame" is just a temporary mirage" with lyrics like:

I'm so confused by the things I read, I need the truth
But the truth is, I don't know who to believe
The left says yes, and the right says no
I'm in between and the more I learn
Well, the less I know...

Cincinnati Enquirer contributor Britt Robson criticizes the "innocuous" socio-political stance reflected in these same lines because DeYoung's proposed solution is to "forget about it and start 'living high on borrowed time.'" Similarly, Newsday critic Wayne Robins compares these lyrics to Supertramp's "The Logical Song" but says that rather than "following this worthwhile admission through to some sensible conclusion" the band cops-out by concluding this verse with the line "I got to make a show."

A music video was filmed of the band performing the song on stage. The video is included on the Caught In The Act DVD. A clip from this video was shown (as Kilroy's band) in the Kilroy Was Here film.

== Personnel ==
- Dennis DeYoung - lead vocals, keyboards
- Tommy Shaw - lead guitar, backing vocals
- James Young - rhythm guitar, backing vocals
- Chuck Panozzo - bass guitar
- John Panozzo - drums, percussion
