= Paradise Club =

Paradise Club may refer to:

- Paradise Rock Club, Boston
- Smalls Paradise, New York City
- Paradise Club (Atlantic City, New Jersey)
- The Paradise Club, a BBC TV programme
- The Paradise, a fictional theatre featured in the film, Phantom of the Paradise

== See also ==
- Club Paradise (disambiguation)
- Paradise (disambiguation)
- Paradise Theatre (disambiguation)
