= The Grand Illusion (song) =

1977 song by Styx

Song by Styx

from the album The Grand Illusion
- Released: 1977
- Recorded: 1977
- Genre: Progressive rock, art rock
- Length: 4:36
- Label: A&M
- Songwriter(s): Dennis DeYoung
- Producer(s): Styx

"The Grand Illusion" is a song written by Dennis DeYoung that was released as the title track of Styx's 1977 album The Grand Illusion. Not only is it the title track, but it provides the theme of the entire album. Although not released as a commercial single, it received significant radio airplay.

== Lyrics and music ==
The theme of "Grand Illusion", as well as the Grand Illusion album, is that things aren't always what they appear to be and it is a "grand illusion" that success will make you happy, and failure will make you miserable. The song's theme also reflects on the pressures of being a media star. The band found that once they became successful, it did not make them any happier. The theme is set up by lyrics such as "Don't be fooled by the radio/the TV or the magazines/They'll show you photographs of how your life should be/But they're just someone else's fantasy...Just remember that it's all a Grand Illusion/And deep inside we're all the same."

DeYoung said of the song's theme that:

It's that feeling that success is set up in such a way that if you succeed you're a failure, and if you don't succeed you're a failure. The system makes you believe that if you get to Point A, everything changes for you, and if you can't get there, you're a schmuck. Unfortunately, when you get to Point A, you find out you're still a schmuck...[The group's mistake in the past was that] "we should have given up on the dream and dealt with the reality – because the dream was pretty bogus to begin with.

Styx guitarist James Young said of the theme that "You expect that you yourself are going to change as a person, when in fact everything around you changes. The physical things you have to deal with change, but your own emotions, your own emotional makeup, are still there."

After DeYoung wrote the title track, he and other band members wrote additional songs on these themes to fill out the album.

== Reception ==
"The Grand Illusion" became popular on the radio despite not being released as a single. Billboard rated "The Grand Illusion" as one of the "best cuts" on The Grand Illusion album. In his review of the album, Allmusic critic Mike DeGagne said that "De Young pretentiously struts his singing prowess throughout the title track."

Classic Rock critic Malcolm Dome rated "The Grand Illusion" as Styx's greatest song. Dome said called it "pomp rock with style, confidence, command and ingenuity" with lyrics "about separating reality from fantasy." Classic Rock History critic Tony Scavieli rated it Styx's 3rd best song, calling it " a bombastic celebration of progressive rock wrapped in slick production, tight arrangements, and brilliant musicianship." Ultimate Classic Rock critic Sterling Whitaker rated it DeYoung's 4th best rock song, calling it "a rumination on the media and the illusory nature of success, set to a track that juxtaposes heavy guitar power chords, blazing solos and DeYoung's flair for classical composition. Midder rated it as Styx's 3rd best song, calling it "a masterpiece that showcases the band’s ability to seamlessly blend progressive rock with catchy pop melodies" and praising the "hauntingly beautiful lyrics and intricate instrumentation." uDiscoverMusic said that it "switches effortlessly between pomp-drenched keyboard fanfares, effortless pop melodies, and intricate guitar heroics in just four packed minutes, with a vivid treatise on the artifice of the American dream."

== Other appearances ==
"The Grand Illusion" appeared on several of Styx's live and compilation albums. It appeared on the compilation albums such as Styx Classics Volume 15, Greatest Hits in 1995, Singles Collection in 2000, Styx Yesterday & Today in 2001 and Come Sail Away – The Styx Anthology in 2004. It has remained in Styx's live repertoire over the decades since its release and has appeared on the live albums Return to Paradise, Arch Allies: Live at Riverport and At the River's Edge: Live in St. Louis.
