= Show Me the Way (Styx song) =

Single by Styx

from the album Edge of the Century
- B-side: "Back to Chicago"
- Released: November 1990
- Recorded: 1989
- Genre: Soft rock
- Length: 4:35
- Label: A&M
- Songwriter: Dennis DeYoung
- Producer: Dennis DeYoung

Styx singles chronology
"Love Is the Ritual" (1990)	"Show Me the Way" (1990)	"Love at First Sight" (1991)

"Show Me the Way" is a song by American rock band Styx, written by Dennis DeYoung and released as the second single from Edge of the Century. It peaked at number 3 on the Billboard Hot 100 chart in March 1991 (Styx's eighth and last US top 10 single to date). The song's music video was directed by Michael Bay.

== Background ==
Lead vocalist/keyboardist Dennis DeYoung, a devout Roman Catholic, originally wrote the song for his son Matthew as a pseudo-hymn about the struggle to keep the faith in a "world so filled with hatred".

In January 1991, just prior to the United States' entry into the Gulf War, music director Chris Taylor from WAVA-FM in Washington, D.C., and Knoxville DJ Ray Edwards from WOKI-FM each did their own customized "Desert Shield Mix" incorporating television and call-in comments from officials, soldiers and callers as well as C-SPAN's coverage of the House and Senate debates. The single had not yet peaked when the war officially ended on February 28, 1991.

Written in 6/8 time, the song begins quietly with the lone DeYoung on vocals and transitions into a big sounding vocal triad chorus. The bridge uses a solo DeYoung vocal praying and pleading that "if I see a light, should I believe? Tell me, how will I know?" followed by, on the album version, an acoustic guitar leading into an electric guitar solo.

== Release and performances ==
The single rose up the Billboard Hot 100 reaching number 3 the week of March 16, 1991, and remained in the top 40 for 23 weeks. The song also hit number 3 on the Adult Contemporary chart, remaining in the top 40 of that chart for 31 weeks. It also peaked at number 4 on the Canadian pop charts.

The song was Styx's fourth and final top 5 single to date (and eighth top 10 single), and comes in at number 68 on the Billboard rankings of the top Hot 100 singles of 1991. The song also placed Styx among a handful of artists to have top 10 singles in three different decades, the 1970s ("Lady", "Come Sail Away", "Babe"), the 1980s ("The Best of Times", "Too Much Time on My Hands", "Mr. Roboto", "Don't Let It End"), and the 1990s ("Show Me the Way").

Despite the song's enormous success along with "Babe", "Don't Let It End" and "The Best of Times", it has not been performed live by the band since singer Dennis DeYoung was dismissed in 1999. DeYoung, however, still performs the song regularly on his solo tours.

== Charts ==
=== Weekly charts ===
Chart (1990–1991)	Peak position
Canada RPM Top Singles	4
Canada RPM Adult Contemporary	3
US Billboard Hot 100	3
US Adult Contemporary (Billboard)	3

=== Year-end charts ===
Chart (1991)	Position
Canada Top Singles (RPM)	31
US Billboard Hot 100	68
US Adult Contemporary (Billboard)	23

== Personnel ==
- Dennis DeYoung – lead vocals, keyboards, Roland D-50
- James Young – lead guitar, backing vocals
- Glen Burtnik – rhythm guitar, backing vocals
- Chuck Panozzo – bass
- John Panozzo – drums
