= Club Paradise (disambiguation) =

Club Paradise is a 1986 American comedy film.

Club Paradise may also refer to:

- "Club Paradise", a song from the album Take Care by Canadian recording artist Drake
- Club Paradise Tour, a concert tour by Drake
- Sensation Hunters (1945 film), a film also known as Club Paradise
- Club Paradise (nightclub), a former nightclub in Memphis, Tennessee

== See also ==
- Paradise Club (disambiguation)
