= Queen of Spades (song) =

Song by Styx

from the album Pieces of Eight
- Released: September 1978
- Recorded: 1978
- Genre: Progressive rock, hard rock
- Length: 5:38
- Label: A&M
- Songwriters: James Young, Dennis DeYoung
- Producer: Styx

"Queen of Spades" is a song by the American rock band Styx, released in 1978 on the album Pieces of Eight. It was co-written by keyboardist Dennis DeYoung and guitarist James "JY" Young, and sung by DeYoung. The song borrows its structure from the band's earlier song "Suite Madame Blue". "Queen of Spades" was also the B-side to the second single from the album, "Sing for the Day". Young co-wrote it as a tribute to Jimi Hendrix.

== Background ==
The song's lyrics are about the lure of gambling, and starts with a gentle opening before transitioning to a more hard rock sound, before finally ending with the calmer melody of the opening. Young stated in a Songfacts interview, "'Queen of Spades' is really lifting the concept or structure of 'Suite Madame Blue', where we start out slow and then build to the big chorus. We play it in the key of B minor."

In an interview with Classic Rock in 2013, DeYoung said "my involvement amounted to singing the melody while JY was responsible for everything else, all the chords and the lyrics. Those are his lyrics".

== Reception ==
PopMatters ranked the song 11th on their list of the top 15 Styx songs and wrote, "in which Young's caffeinated riffs and John Panozzo's best drum performance subjugate DeYoung's over-cultivated Broadway shtick into a roaring, bile-infused powerhouse."

In 2013, Ultimate Classic Rock ranked it the fifth best Styx composition by DeYoung, and in 2014 they ranked it the third best Styx composition by Young.

Music critic Martin Popoff ranked "Queen of Spades" third on his list of the "20 most headbanging Styx songs" and wrote that it was Young's second best riff (after "Man of Miracles"), and liked the "pretty muscular" half-time break in it.

AllMusic critic Mike DeGagne picked the song along with the album's three singles as one of its highlights.

American Songwriter listed "Queen of Spades" on their list of "4 Songs for People Who Say They Don't Like Styx", calling the song "quite the gem".

== Personnel ==
- Dennis DeYoung - lead vocals, keyboard
- James "JY" Young - guitar, backing vocals
- Tommy Shaw - guitar, backing vocals
- Chuck Panozzo - bass
- John Panozzo - drums, percussion
