= Why Me (Styx song) =

Single by Styx

from the album Cornerstone
- B-side: "Lights"
- Released: December 1979
- Genre: Pop rock
- Length: 3:54
- Label: A&M
- Songwriter: Dennis DeYoung

Styx singles chronology
| "Babe" (1979) | "Why Me" (1979) | "Boat on the River" (1980) |

"Why Me" is a song written by Dennis DeYoung that was first released on Styx's 1979 double-platinum album Cornerstone. It was also released as the second single from the album, and reached #26 on the Billboard Hot 100, #12 on Radio and Records, and #10 on the Canada RPM Top 100 Singles chart.

== Background ==
DeYoung wrote "Why Me" at a time that he was depressed. He stated that "What I was saying was, why does this keep happening to me? I'm supposed to have it made, but I feel just like you do." Although baseball is not mentioned in the song, the song was inspired by an incident in which DeYoung was hit in the head with a baseball at practice for a local league. At a concert in Chicago in 1980, DeYoung further explained the song as "Do you ever get the feeling that no matter what you do, somehow or some way it's going to end up messed up? Every time I think I've got my life in order so that I know where I'm going and I know what I'm doing, it turns around and kicks me square in the rear. That's when I ask: Why me?"

DeYoung also said:

I had the idea before, but when I got hit with the baseball, that is when I knew what I wanted to say in the song. But there is no mention of the baseball. Everybody goes through some "why me's" constantly. Some of them are just bigger than others.

"Why Me" has been described by Styx biographer Sterling Whitaker as "an up-tempo pop-rock track." Eric Hegedus of The Morning Call noted that "Why Me" is one of the songs on Cornerstone reminiscent of Styx's previous style (as opposed to songs like "Babe," "First Time" and "Boat on the River") and found it similar to "I'm O.K." from Styx' prior album Pieces of Eight.

The song incorporates a horn section and features interplay between Styx guitarist James Young and a saxophone played by Steve Eisen. Wichita Beacon reviewer Terre Johnson stated that "Why Me" (along with "Babe" and "Love in the Midnight" from the same album) incorporates Styx' first use of strings and horns and that those instruments "provide effective textures."

Ultimate Classic Rock critic Eduardo Rivadavia regarded "Why Me" as one of the songs on Cornerstone that combined "Styx’s familiar hard-rock foundation and instrumental prowess...with incrementally catchy choruses, gorgeous three-part harmonies, loads of bright synthesizers and even saxophones" while avoiding "the complicated arrangements or cerebral wordplay" from Styx's earlier records.

The song was an unexpected single. The original plan was for the ballad "First Time" to be released as the second single following the #1 single "Babe." In fact some radio stations in the U.S. were starting to play "First Time". However, guitarist Tommy Shaw did not want to release a second ballad right after "Babe". This disagreement resulted in DeYoung being fired briefly from the band in early 1980. DeYoung reluctantly agreed, and "Why Me" was chosen by A&M Records to be the second single.

== Reception ==
Billboard compared "Why Me" to songs by Queen and Supertramp, describing it as a "high gloss, multi layered midtempo rocker with its fresh harmonies and thoughtful lyrics" and also praised the saxophone and guitar solo. Cash Box called it "an intriguing blend of regal electronic arrangements and bubbly keyboard phrases." Record World called it a "dramatic pop-rocker," saying that "DeYoung's rousing vocals play off a lilting keyboard that transforms into a progressive instrumental break." Vincennes Sun-Commercial critic Rick Patterson called it "a definite single pick for AM radio, a soft vocal ballad that really lays you back," also calling out its interesting use of saxophone and string instruments and praising DeYoung's vocal performance.

Released as Cornerstone's second single, "Why Me" reached #26 on the Billboard Hot 100 singles chart in February 1980. The song also reached number 10 on the Canada RPM Top 100 Singles chart on the week of February 23, 1980.

Allmusic critic Stephen Thomas Erlewine criticized the compilation album Come Sail Away – The Styx Anthology for excluding this song.

== Live performances ==
In live performances in the early 1980s, Styx would incorporate a saxophone player and four horn players just for "Why Me" and would use them to play an extended instrumental section.

== Personnel ==
- Dennis DeYoung - lead vocals, keyboards
- James Young - lead guitar, backing vocals
- Tommy Shaw - rhythm guitar, backing vocals
- Chuck Panozzo - bass guitar
- John Panozzo - drums

Additional musicians

- Steve Eisen - saxophone

== "Lights" ==
The b-side of the "Why Me" single was "Lights," another song from Cornerstone that was written by DeYoung and Tommy Shaw. The lyrics of "Lights" were reflect the dichotomy between musicians' need for private time versus their desire to perform their music for fans. "Lights" was issued as a single a-side in the UK, Germany and Spain and reached #35 on the German charts. Allmusic critic Mike DeGagne described "Lights" as having "silky harmonies and welcoming choruses." Edmonton Journal critic Nancy Arab found "Lights" to be one of the few worthwhile songs on Cornerstone ("Why Me" and "Babe" being the others) and said that the band sounds similar to Supertramp on the song due to the keyboard and vocal performances. Rolling Stone critic David Fricke said it was "enlivened by a bouncy beat and a hint of horns, [and] boasts yet another hook on which you could hang your AM radio. Hegedus of Morning Call found it to be "triumphant." When Styx performed "Lights" in concert in 1980, a light show involving colored lights and strobes was displayed.
