= Paradise Theatre (Chicago) =

Chicago movie theater, 1928-1956

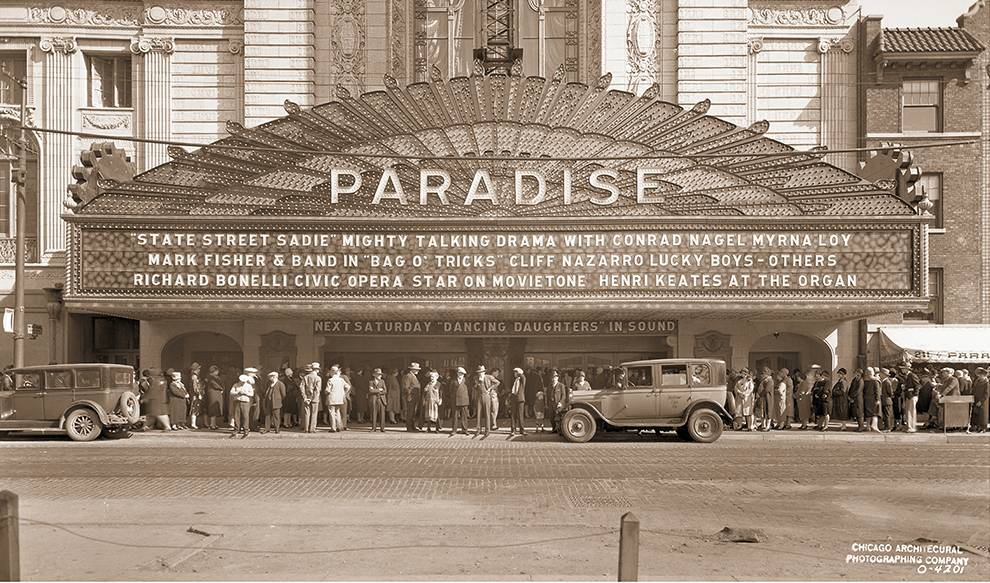
- Paradise Theatre in 1928
- Interactive map of Paradise Theatre
- Address: 231 N. Crawford Avenue; Chicago, Illinois; United States
- Coordinates: 41°53′3.9″N 87°43′32.0″W
- Capacity: 3,500

Construction
- Opened: September 14, 1928
- Closed: 1956
- Demolished: 1956–1958
- Architect: John Eberson
- Builder: Balaban and Katz

The Paradise Theatre was a movie palace in Chicago, Illinois, United States. It was located at 231 N. Crawford Avenue (now Pulaski Road) near the intersection with West Madison Street in the West Garfield Park area of Chicago's West Side.

== History ==
The Paradise Theatre was built by the Balaban and Katz chain of movie theaters and opened on September 14, 1928. It was promoted as the world's most beautiful theater for its stunning interior and exterior beauty. It is regarded as one of the finest designs by architect John Eberson, as the sheer opulence and intricate craftsmanship that went into the theater made it a showpiece in and of itself. Unfortunately, flaws in the design (blamed on the vast domed ceiling in the over 3,500-seat auditorium) were exposed with the advent of talking pictures. Poor acoustics eventually cost the theater its attendance as neighborhood movie-goers eventually turned to the nearby Mark Brothers showplace, the Marbro Theatre. As a result, business at the Paradise never recovered.

The Paradise Theatre's demise came in 1956, when Balaban and Katz closed the theater, demolished the building, and sold the land to be developed as a supermarket. The theater that was "built to stand forever" almost lived up to that claim. What was estimated to have been a six-month demolition job ended up taking two years.

After the theater's closure, the host committee of the 1956 Democratic National Convention (held at the International Amphitheatre) acquired and removed its seats to use for delegate seating at the convention.

== Organ ==
The Paradise Theatre was home to a large Wurlitzer theatre organ, catalog number Opus 1942. The organ console contained five manuals (keyboards), one of only three such instruments ever made by the Wurlitzer company. The organ, which had 21 ranks of pipes, was removed from the theater in 1948. It was installed in the Los Angeles home studio of Richard Vaughn, an executive at the Hi-Fi Records label. The organ was utilized by Hi-Fi to record a series of noted stereo record albums in the 1950s featuring organist George Wright. In 1969, the instrument was reinstalled in the Phoenix, Arizona, home of William Brown. Brown enlarged the organ to 34 ranks. Since 2007, the organ has been in storage in Phoenix.

== Styx album ==
Despite its financial issues, the Paradise Theatre remains a part of popular culture. Much of its notability is related to the 1981 album Paradise Theatre by the Chicago-based rock band Styx.

Lead singer and keyboardist Dennis DeYoung described the concept album as a fictional account of Chicago's Paradise Theatre from its opening to closing (and eventual abandonment), serving as a metaphor for changing times in America from the late 1970s into the 1980s. The theater depicted on the album's cover art does not closely resemble the real Paradise Theatre; the illustration is more similar to another 1920s Chicago movie palace, the Granada Theatre.
