= High Time (song) =

Single by Styx

from the album Kilroy Was Here
- B-side: "Double Life"
- Released: August 1983 (US)
- Recorded: 1982
- Genre: Pop; rock
- Length: 4:28
- Label: A&M
- Songwriter: Dennis DeYoung
- Producer: Styx

Styx singles chronology
"Don't Let It End" (1983)	"High Time" (1983)	"Music Time" (1984)

"High Time" is the third and final single from the 1983 album, Kilroy Was Here, by Styx. It reached number 48 on the US Billboard Hot 100 singles chart.

In a 2009 interview, Dennis DeYoung revealed that A&M Records released "High Time" as the third single at the last minute. An expensive video for "Haven't We Been Here Before?" was created but never was shown on MTV. Instead, Tommy Shaw wanted a live version of "Cold War" to be the third single. A&M Records finally released "High Time" as the single, with little promotion and no video. Its relative poor performance killed momentum on the Kilroy album.

Cash Box called it a "preachy condemnation of morality mongers" and a "strong defense of freedom of expression."
