= Nothing Ever Goes as Planned =

Single by Styx

from the album Paradise Theatre
- B-side: "Never Say Never"
- Released: July 1981
- Recorded: 1980
- Genre: Rock
- Length: 4:48
- Label: A&M
- Songwriter(s): Dennis DeYoung

Styx singles chronology
"Too Much Time on My Hands" (1981)	"Nothing Ever Goes as Planned" (1981)	"Rockin' the Paradise" (1981)

"Nothing Ever Goes as Planned" is a song written by Dennis DeYoung and released by American rock band Styx on their tenth album Paradise Theatre, as well as being the 3rd single released from the album. A chart disappointment following the first two singles off the album, it peaked at No. 54 on the U.S. pop chart in late summer 1981. It also reached No. 33 on the Canada RPM Top Singles chart in the week of September 5, 1981.

== Lyrics and music ==
The lyrics are about the "inevitability of failure." Charlie Martin of The Catholic Advance said "The song suggests we can't count on anything, that life's somehow a losing proposition." According to DeYoung, the song was inspired by Joseph Heller's 1979 novel Good as Gold and reflects Murphy's law. DeYoung said "The song is about three characters who plan things out, then something happens." The lyrics include lines such as "Nothing ever goes as planned/Even Pharaohs turn to sand" and ends with the lines "I strut around the stage like a little king tonight/But when the show is over/I've got the big star blues."

Kansas City Times critic Leland Rucker said that the song has reggae rhythms and jazz changes that resemble Steely Dan. Muncie Star critic Kim Teverbaugh noted that the song shows a newfound ability by Styx to incorporate significant horn sections into their work.

== Reception ==
Billboard described it as a "midtempo rocker" and praised the "lead vocals, harmonies and fluid rhythmic support." Record World said the song has "an ambitious arrangement, complete with smart tempo shifts, bright horn charts and a perky beat." Pittsburgh Press critic Pete Bishop described it as a "romping calypso-rocker." Kingston Whig-Standard critic Greg Burliuk identified "Nothing Ever Goes as Planned" as his favorite song on Paradise Theater, saying that it's "the album's most effective statement of how illusory are our dreams." The Leaf Chronicle critic Tony Durr called it a "perfectly beautiful solid rock entry" that "keeps surprising you with its excellence," saying that "you cannot sit still, and the orchestration on the bridge and finale flattens you with horns! horns! horns!"

Allmusic critic Stephen Thomas Erlewine criticized the compilation album Come Sail Away – The Styx Anthology for excluding this song.
