= Cornerstone (Styx album) =

Studio album by Styx
- Released: October 1979
- Recorded: 1979
- Studios: Pumpkin Studios, Oak Lawn, Illinois
- Genres: Pop rock; soft rock; progressive rock
- Length: 38:17
- Label: A&M
- Producer: Styx

Styx chronology
Pieces of Eight (1978)	Cornerstone (1979)	Paradise Theatre (1981)

Singles from Cornerstone
- 1. "Babe" Released: September 1979; 2. "Why Me" Released: December 1979; 3. "Borrowed Time" Released: March 1980 (US); 4. "Boat on the River" Released: March 1980 (UK); 5. "Lights" Released: May 1980 (UK)

Professional ratings
Review scores
Source	Rating
AllMusic	4/5 stars
Record Mirror	4/5 stars
Rolling Stone	(mixed)
The Rolling Stone Album Guide	1.5/5 stars

Cornerstone is the ninth studio album by the American rock band Styx, released in 1979. Styx's third straight multi-platinum selling album, Cornerstone was Styx's first album to earn a Grammy nomination, which was for Best Rock Performance by a Duo or Group. Like the four previous Styx albums, the band produced the album themselves. Styx recorded the album at Pumpkin Studios in Oak Lawn, Illinois.

Cornerstone is best known for including the group's only No. 1 Billboard Hot 100 Single, the power ballad "Babe". The album also includes the folk rock song "Boat on the River," which was a hit in Europe, though it failed to chart in the United States. "Why Me" was also a notable song, peaking at #26 on Billboard, #18 on Cashbox, #12 on Radio and Records, and #10 on Canada Top 100.

Cornerstone became Styx's first US Top 5 album, entering Billboard on October 13, 1979, and peaking at No. 2 in late November.

== Background ==
The album represented a musical transition for Styx, as the band emphasized its pop sound more than the progressive rock influences that dominated their first eight studio albums. Peaking at #2, the album was Styx's highest album chart peak until its successor, 1981's Paradise Theatre, which hit #1.

From a songwriting standpoint, Cornerstone is dominated by Dennis DeYoung and Tommy Shaw—each is credited as sole songwriter or co-writer for five tracks on the album (including two collaborations between the pair).

Consistent with most of Styx's catalog from 1975 to 1983, DeYoung's contributions to Cornerstone found the most success on the charts. The first single to be released was also to become Styx's only US #1 single: "Babe," which DeYoung wrote as a birthday present for his wife Suzanne. The track was first performed and recorded as a demo with just him and the Panozzo brothers but A&M executives heard the track and insisted it go on the album. Shaw overdubbed a guitar solo in the song's middle section.

"First Time," another power ballad also written by DeYoung, was intended to be Cornerstone's second single. Shaw, however, expressed concern that releasing two ballads in a row would alienate the band's hard rock fan base. He felt strongly enough that he threatened to leave the band over the proposed release. The upbeat song "Why Me" (once again written by DeYoung) was chosen instead, reaching #26 on the charts. The division was strong enough that DeYoung was briefly fired from the band, although he was invited back before word reached the press or public. "First Time" did get released as a single in the Philippines.

Shaw's major contribution to the album was the folkish "Boat on the River," which became the band's biggest European hit. Shaw's other contributions included the pop-rocker "Never Say Never," the Shaw/DeYoung album-opener "Lights," the more progressively-flavored song "Love in the Midnight" and "Borrowed Time," a DeYoung/Shaw collaboration.

James Young only had one song on the album, the hard rocker "Eddie," which was aimed at left-wing politician Edward Kennedy, unsuccessfully pleading with him not to make a run for the U.S. presidency. Young used a guitar-synthesizer for the solo.

Instrumentally, the record demonstrated the shift to a more pop-oriented and organic sound. DeYoung predominantly used a Fender Rhodes electric piano on over half of the tracks and the group used real horns and strings on the album on several tracks. While commercially successful, Cornerstone brought to light the first fragmenting of the group's collective artistic vision (DeYoung wanted to move the band more into pop while Shaw and Young both favored a rock approach). These divisions would continue to deepen, ultimately leading to Styx's dissolution following the release of the 1983 album, Kilroy Was Here.

== Track listing ==
Side one
No.	Title	Writer(s)	Lead vocals	Length
1.	"Lights"	Tommy Shaw, Dennis DeYoung	Shaw	4:38
2.	"Why Me"	DeYoung	DeYoung	3:54
3.	"Babe"	DeYoung	DeYoung	4:25
4.	"Never Say Never"	Shaw	Shaw; Young	3:08
5.	"Boat on the River"	Shaw	Shaw	3:10

Side two
No.	Title	Writer(s)	Lead vocals	Length
6.	"Borrowed Time"	DeYoung, Shaw	DeYoung	4:58
7.	"First Time"	DeYoung	DeYoung	4:25
8.	"Eddie"	James "J.Y." Young	Young	4:15
9.	"Love in the Midnight"	Shaw	Shaw	5:25

== Personnel ==
=== Styx ===
- Dennis DeYoung – vocals, keyboards, accordion
- James "JY" Young – vocals, guitars, guitar synthesizer, autoharp
- Tommy Shaw – vocals, guitars, mandolin, autoharp
- Chuck Panozzo – bass
- John Panozzo – drums, percussion

=== Additional personnel ===
- Steve Eisen – saxophone solo on "Why Me"
- Arnie Roth – strings and string arrangements on "First Time" and "Love in the Midnight"
- Ed Tossing – horns, horn arrangements on “Lights”

=== Production ===
- Styx – producers
- Rob Kingsland – engineer
- Gary Loizzo – engineer
- Ted Jensen – mastering at Sterling Sound (New York City, New York)
- Jim Cahill – promotion coordinator
- Mick Haggerty – design
- Aaron Rapoport – photography
- Derek Sutton and Stardust Enterprises – management

== Charts ==
=== Weekly charts ===
Chart (1979–1980)	Peak position
Australian Albums (Kent Music Report)	21
Canada Top Albums/CDs (RPM)	3
Dutch Albums (Album Top 100)	27
German Albums (Offizielle Top 100)	6
New Zealand Albums (RMNZ)	14
Norwegian Albums (VG-lista)	25
UK Albums (Official Charts)	36
US Billboard 200	2

=== Year-end charts ===
Chart (1979)	Position
Canada Top Albums/CDs (RPM)	44
Chart (1980)	Position
Canada Top Albums/CDs (RPM)	4
German Albums (Offizielle Top 100)	12
US Billboard 200	13

== Certifications and sales ==
Region	Certification	Certified units/sales
Canada (Music Canada)	Platinum	100,000^{^}
Germany (BVMI)	Gold	250,000^{^}
United States (RIAA)	2× Platinum	2,000,000^{^}
^{^} Shipments figures based on certification alone.
