= Edge of the Century =

Studio album by Styx
- Released: October 9, 1990
- Recorded: April 1989 – August 1990
- Studios: CRC, Chicago
- Genre: Hard rock
- Length: 42:35
- Label: A&M
- Producer: Dennis DeYoung

Styx chronology
Caught in the Act (1984)	Edge of the Century (1990)	Return to Paradise (1997)

Singles from Edge of the Century
- 1. "Love Is the Ritual" Released: October 1990; 2. "Carrie Ann" Released: October 1990 (Germany); 3. "Show Me the Way" Released: November 1990; 4. "Love at First Sight" Released: March 1991

Professional ratings
Review scores
Source	Rating
AllMusic	2/5 stars
Entertainment Weekly	C
The Rolling Stone Album Guide	1/5 stars

Edge of the Century is the twelfth studio album by the American rock band Styx, released in 1990 on A&M Records. It was the first Styx album featuring A&M solo artist Glen Burtnik and the final album to feature drummer John Panozzo before his death in 1996. It is also their final album to be released on A&M Records.

The album spawned two international singles. "Show Me the Way" was written by DeYoung and peaked at #3 on both the Hot 100 Pop Singles Chart and Adult Contemporary Chart. Some radio stations played a version edited with snippets of congressional debate and caller dedications to troops in the Gulf War. "Love Is the Ritual," (Pop singles peak #80) written by Burtnik and Plinky Giglio, and "Love at First Sight" (Pop singles chart peak, #25 - only released in the United States), written by Burtnik, DeYoung and Young, were also released as singles, but neither garnered the same amount of success as "Show Me the Way."

The album sold more than 500,000 copies and was certified gold by the RIAA.

== Track listing ==
No.	Title	Writer(s)	Lead vocals	Length
1.	"Love Is the Ritual"	Burtnik, Giglio	Burtnik	3:48
2.	"Show Me the Way"	DeYoung	DeYoung	4:35
3.	"Edge of the Century"	Burtnik, Bob Burger	Burtnik	4:20
4.	"Love at First Sight"	Burtnik, DeYoung, Young	DeYoung	4:35
5.	"All in a Day's Work"	Burtnik, DeYoung	Burtnik	4:11
6.	"Not Dead Yet"	Ralph Covert	DeYoung	3:32
7.	"World Tonite"	Burtnik	Burtnik	3:38
8.	"Carrie Ann"	DeYoung	DeYoung	4:26
9.	"Homewrecker"	Young, DeYoung	Young	5:12
10.	"Back to Chicago"	DeYoung	DeYoung	4:18

== Personnel ==
=== Styx ===
- Dennis DeYoung – vocals, keyboards, accordion
- James "JY" Young – guitars, vocals
- Glen Burtnik – guitars, vocals
- Chuck Panozzo – bass
- John Panozzo – drums, percussion

=== Additional personnel ===
- Salvatore "Plinky" Giglio – sequencing (1)
- Gary Fry – Synclavier programming (4)
- Terry Fryer – sound effects (9)
- Howard Levy – harmonica
- Joe Pusateri – percussion
- Ronald Kolber – baritone saxophone
- Jon Negus – clarinet, saxophones, horn arrangements (10)
- Michael Smith – saxophones
- Mike Halpin – trombone
- Danny Barber – trumpet
- Mark Ohlsen – trumpet
- Mac Bialystock – horn arrangements (10)

=== Production ===
- Dennis DeYoung – producer, mixing
- Phil Bonanno – engineer, mixing
- Chris Shepard – second engineer
- Plinky Giglio – additional engineer (1)
- Ted Jensen – mastering at Sterling Sound, NYC
- Hugh Syme – art direction, design
- Mark Hauser – photography

== Charts ==
Chart (1990–1991)	Peak position
Canada Top Albums/CDs (RPM)	49
US Billboard 200	63

== Certifications and sales ==
Region	Certification	Certified units/sales
United States (RIAA)	Gold	500,000^{^}
^{^} Shipments figures based on certification alone.
