= Crystal Ball (Styx album) =

Studio album by Styx
- Released: October 1, 1976
- Recorded: 1976
- Studios: Paragon, Chicago
- Genres: Progressive rock; hard rock
- Length: 34:45
- Label: A&M
- Producer: Styx

Styx chronology
Equinox (1975)	Crystal Ball (1976)	The Grand Illusion (1977)

Singles from Crystal Ball
- 1. "Mademoiselle" Released: November 1976; 2. "Jennifer" Released: February 1977; 3. "Crystal Ball" Released: June 1977

Crystal Ball is the sixth studio album by the American rock band Styx. It was released on October 1, 1976 under A&M Records and marked the recording debut of the band's new guitarist, Tommy Shaw.

"Mademoiselle" was Shaw's vocal debut and the album's Top-40 hit.

The album's title track would become a concert staple for the band, as it was performed on every subsequent Styx tour with which Shaw was involved.

Claude Debussy's classical piece "Clair de Lune" served as the intro to the album's closing ballad, "Ballerina". The version of "Clair de Lune" on Crystal Ball features only Dennis DeYoung on piano, with the key changed from D flat to C, as the next track ("Ballerina") begins in C minor.

== Background ==
Following the release of the band's 1975 record Equinox, founding member John J. Curulewski left the band, leaving Styx lacking a lead guitarist.

== Reception ==
Professional ratings
Review scores
Source	Rating
AllMusic	3.5/5 stars
Rolling Stone	(favorable)
The Rolling Stone Album Guide	1/5 stars

Crystal Ball lacked the commercial strength and chart performance of its predecessor Equinox or its follow up Grand Illusion. It peaked at #66 on the Billboard album chart, the lowest of any of the Styx A&M releases. It was certified gold in 1984, 8 years after its release.

Daevid Jehnzen of AllMusic rated Crystal Ball three-and-a-half out of five stars. He stated that it was better than Styx's previous album, Equinox (1975), although it was not as successful. He also said that the album showcases "Styx's increased skill for crafting simple, catchy pop hooks out of their bombastic sound." Alan Niester of Rolling Stone also found the album favorable, stating that "although Styx is based in Chicago, the group has its English scam down pat". He also stated that the instrumentation "always seems on the verge of going out of control, giving the whole album an extra surge of excitement."

== Album Cover ==
The album's cover art was designed by Jim Ladwig, with art direction by Roland Young and photography by John Welzenbach. The cover features a pair of hands weilding an illuminating blue and purple crystal ball, with which a ballerina is dancing inside.

== Track listing ==
Side one
No.	Title	Writer(s)	Lead vocals	Length
1.	"Put Me On"	James Young; Dennis DeYoung; Tommy Shaw	Young; DeYoung	4:56
2.	"Mademoiselle"	DeYoung; Shaw	Shaw	3:57
3.	"Jennifer"	DeYoung	DeYoung	4:16
4.	"Crystal Ball"	Shaw	Shaw	4:32

Side two
No.	Title	Writer(s)	Lead vocals	Length
1.	"Shooz"	Shaw; Young	Shaw	4:44
2.	"This Old Man"	DeYoung	DeYoung	5:11
3.	"Clair de Lune" / "Ballerina"	Claude Debussy / DeYoung; Shaw	DeYoung	1:05 / 5:53
Total length:				34:45

== Personnel ==
=== Styx ===
- Dennis DeYoung – vocals, keyboards
- James "JY" Young – vocals, guitars
- Tommy Shaw – vocals, guitars
- Chuck Panozzo – bass
- John Panozzo – drums, percussion

=== Production ===
- Producer: Styx
- Engineers: Barry Mraz and Rob Kingsland

== Charts ==
Chart (1976–1977)	Peak position
Canada Top Albums/CDs (RPM)	21
US Billboard 200	66

== Certifications ==
Region	Certification	Certified units/sales
Canada (Music Canada)	Gold	50,000^{^}
United States (RIAA)	Gold	500,000^{^}
^{^} Shipments figures based on certification alone.
