= Mademoiselle (song) =

Single by Styx

from the album Crystal Ball
- B-side: "Lonely Child"
- Released: November 1976 (US)
- Genre: Rock
- Length: 3:57
- Label: A&M
- Songwriters: Dennis DeYoung; Tommy Shaw

Styx singles chronology
"Lorelei" (1976)	"Mademoiselle" (1976)	"Crystal Ball" (1977)

"Mademoiselle" is the first single released from Styx's Crystal Ball album. The B-side, "Lonely Child", was taken from the previous album, Equinox. It peaked at #36 on the Billboard magazine Hot 100 singles chart the week of December 25, 1976, becoming Styx's third top 40 hit. It also reached number 25 on the Canadian RPM singles chart on the week of January 22, 1977.

Cash Box said that "The group successfully borrows a strong Queen sound — the guitar and vocal harmonies sound especially familiar."

== Personnel ==
- Tommy Shaw – lead vocals, lead guitar
- Dennis DeYoung – keyboards, backing vocals
- James Young – rhythm guitar, backing vocals
- Chuck Panozzo – bass
- John Panozzo – drums

== Charts ==
Chart (1976–1977)	Peak position
Canada Top Singles (RPM)	25
US Billboard Hot 100	36
