= Don't Let It End =

Single by Styx

from the album Kilroy Was Here
- B-side: "(A.D. 1928) Rockin' the Paradise"
- Released: April 1983
- Recorded: 1982
- Genre: Soft rock
- Length: 4:53
- Label: A&M
- Songwriter: Dennis DeYoung
- Producer: Styx

Styx singles chronology
"Mr. Roboto" (1983)	"Don't Let It End" (1983)	"High Time" (1983)

"Don't Let It End" is the third track and the second top 10 single on the 1983 album Kilroy Was Here, by Styx. The song is also reprised at the end of the album.

== Background ==
The song was written and sung by Dennis DeYoung. The track is a mid-tempo ballad about one who breaks up with a lover and pleads to get the person back. Styx guitarist James Young said that "it has sort of an underlying double meaning – music is what we love. It's obviously a love song between two people, but it's meant to carry over, and at the end in the reprise it is more blatant [that rock 'n' roll rather than romance is what the singer wants to keep alive]."

According to DeYoung, the track was originally slated as the first single from Kilroy Was Here until the staff at A&M suggested "Mr. Roboto". DeYoung said:

["Don't Let It End" is] not gonna scare our audience. It's not gonna upset radio. It's not gonna make anybody crazy, because they'll say "Oh, we know that side of Styx. We've been listening to these assholes for over eleven years. We know what that is."

But ultimately the band decided to take a chance that the power of "Mr. Roboto" would be a better choice as the lead single.

== Reception ==
The song reached number 6 on the US Billboard Hot 100 the week of July 2, 1983 and number 56 on the UK Singles Chart. It also reached number 15 on the Canadian RPM Top Singles chart the week of July 2, 1983. At the time, it was the seventh Styx single to peak in the top 10 of the Billboard Hot 100. It also reached number 13 on the Billboard Adult Contemporary chart.

Cash Box noted that the song is "a return to [DeYoung's] soft romantic side" after the more futuristic "Mr. Roboto" and that guitarist Tommy Shaw "breaks up the weak-kneed plea with sturdy rock guitar work." AllMusic critic Mike DeGagne considered it one of Styx's best singles, saying that it "almost captures the same endearing qualities as their number one hit, 'Babe', did four years earlier." The Morning Call said that DeYoung's lead vocal sounded like Neil Sedaka and the song was similar to previous Styx ballads. Rapid City Journal critic Tim Gebhart called it a "beautiful ballad in the traditional Styx vein. Midder rated it as Styx's 4th best song, calling it "a stirring ballad that showcases Styx’s softer side and explores the pain of a failing relationship" and praising the "haunting piano melody, soaring vocals, and poignant lyrics."

AllMusic critic Stephen Thomas Erlewine criticized the compilation album Come Sail Away – The Styx Anthology for excluding this song.

Despite the song's success, along with "Show Me the Way", "Babe" and "The Best of Times" it has not been performed live by the band since singer Dennis DeYoung was dismissed in 1999. DeYoung, however, still performs the song regularly on his solo tours.

== Video ==
The video of the track was directed by Brian Gibson. It starts out with Dennis portraying Kilroy looking at a picture of a girlfriend he lost (the picture is of Dennis' wife in real life, Suzanne) and then gets up to go in another room which morphs into the prison that his character of Kilroy was in. Then Dennis morphs into the Kilroy as prisoner character and joins the members of Styx who play prisoners in the video performing the track and then the end shows Dennis as he appeared at the intro.

The reprise of the track was more to do with not letting rock and roll die and had a teaser of the riff to "Mr. Roboto" before ending like a 1950s rock song with Tommy Shaw singing the first section and DeYoung the finale. The live version ends with the ending guitar chords from "Twist and Shout".

== Charts ==
=== Weekly charts ===
Chart (1983)	Peak position
Canada RPM Top Singles	15
Canada RPM Adult Contemporary	9
Germany (GfK)	70
UK Singles (Official Charts)	56
US Billboard Hot 100	6
US Adult Contemporary (Billboard)	13
US Cash Box Top 100	14

=== Year-end charts ===
Chart (1983)	Position
US Billboard Hot 100	60
US Cash Box	93

== Personnel ==
- Dennis DeYoung – lead vocals, keyboards
- Tommy Shaw – lead guitar, backing vocals
- James "J.Y." Young – rhythm guitar, backing vocals
- Chuck Panozzo – bass
- John Panozzo – drums
