= Mr. Roboto =

1983 single by Styx

Single by Styx

from the album Kilroy Was Here
- B-side: "Snowblind"
- Released: February 11, 1983
- Recorded: 1982
- Genre: Synth-rock; synth-pop
- Length: 4:48 (single version); 5:30 (album version)
- Label: A&M
- Songwriter: Dennis DeYoung
- Producer: Styx

Styx singles chronology
"Rockin' the Paradise" (1981)	"Mr. Roboto" (1983)	"Don't Let It End" (1983)

Audio sample
- "Mr Roboto": file; help

"Mr. Roboto" is a song by American rock band Styx, released as the lead single from their eleventh studio album, Kilroy Was Here (1983). It was written by band member Dennis DeYoung. In Canada, it went to number one on the RPM national singles chart. It entered on both the US Billboard Hot 100 and US Cash Box Top 100 on February 12, 1983. On April 30, the song peaked at number three on Billboard, but fared better on Cash Box, where it reached number one.

== Description and background ==
The Japanese lyrics at the beginning of the song are as follows:

どうもありがとうミスターロボット (Dōmo arigatō misutā robotto)
また会う日まで (Mata au hi made)
どうもありがとうミスターロボット (Dōmo arigatō misutā robotto)
秘密を知りたい (Himitsu o shiritai)

The lyrics translate into English as follows:

Thank you very much, Mr. Roboto
Until the day we meet again
Thank you very much, Mr. Roboto
I want to know your secret

The lyric "Dōmo arigatō, Mr. Roboto" has entered popular culture as a catchphrase in the US and Canada.

The song tells part of the story of Robert Orin Charles Kilroy (ROCK), in the rock opera Kilroy Was Here. The song is performed by Kilroy (as played by keyboardist Dennis DeYoung), a rock and roll performer who was placed in a futuristic prison for "rock and roll misfits" by the anti-rock-and-roll group the Majority for Musical Morality (MMM) and its founder Dr. Everett Righteous (played by guitarist James Young). The Roboto is a model of robot which does menial jobs in the prison. Kilroy escapes the prison by overpowering a Roboto prison guard and hiding inside its emptied-out metal shell. When Jonathan Chance (played by guitarist Tommy Shaw) finally meets Kilroy at the very end of the song, Kilroy unmasks and yells "I'm Kilroy! Kilroy!", ending the song.

Stan Winston, who would become well-known through his work on The Terminator, Aliens, Iron Man, and Jurassic Park, designed the Roboto costume and mask, which are displayed prominently on the cover of the album Kilroy Was Here. The song's writer Dennis DeYoung did not think of the song as a single until his wife Suzanne, Dennis's friend Dave, and the staff at A&M suggested it as a good candidate. The track was released as the first single from the album at the last minute instead of "Don't Let It End" and turned out to be the band's last Top 5 US hit for eight years. As a result of this song, the Japanese phrase "domo arigato" entered popular American vernacular. In addition, many have cited this song and the album as potentially having alienated older fans, some calling it "jumping the shark" for the band. Though the song and album may not have resonated with older fans at the time, it remained relevant for younger generations, and James Young has said that due to the song, "we're a part of pop culture."

"Mr. Roboto" has been described as synth-rock, and techno-pop (or synth-pop).

Styx didn't perform the song on tour for 35 years. Shaw said they reintroduced "Mr. Roboto" to their touring set list based on a cover by hard rock band the Protomen: "One day I was looking to see if anyone had covered 'Mr. Roboto,' and this band, the Protomen had, covered it as more of a rock song. It was more like if Freddie Mercury would have done it. I always thought if we were going to do it, Lawrence should sing it more like that; so, that's how we play it." Shaw said they are really performing "a cover of a cover" by performing the Protomen's version in their shows.

== Reception ==
Cash Box reviewed the single, saying that "the group sings of the struggles of a creature with a human heart and an IBM brain. They communicate their message through such devices as a voice box intro and high tech, synth effects." Billboard called it "a mesh of bouncy melody, electronically distorted vocals and a refrain in Japanese," saying that "the group bemoans the plight of 'modern man' oppressed by technology".

== Personnel ==
- Dennis DeYoung – lead vocals, keyboards, synthesizer
- Tommy Shaw – guitar, backing vocals, vocoder
- James Young – guitar, backing vocals, vocoder
- Chuck Panozzo – bass guitar
- John Panozzo – drums

== Music video ==
The song's video, directed by Brian Gibson, depicts Jonathan Chance (played by guitarist Tommy Shaw) walking into the Rock Museum to meet Kilroy, and a robot approaches. After this, it morphs into five robots moving and dancing (choreographed by Kenny Ortega). Shortly thereafter, the robots transform into the members of Styx, including a clean-shaven Dennis DeYoung (he shaved his trademark moustache off at the conclusion of the Paradise Theater tour in 1982). The video then alternates between the band playing the song on a stage and scenes from the Kilroy Was Here backdrop film. Then, the members of Styx morph back into the robots and DeYoung confronts the robots, screaming in the ear of one of the robots before collapsing. DeYoung awakens to see he is being experimented on and runs off. The video cuts back to the ending of the first scene and Jonathan Chance climbs on to the stage. Before the robot removes his mask to reveal Kilroy, another shot of the robot with lights on is used to end the clip.

Playing Mr. Roboto in the video was mime Robert Griffard.

== Single release ==
The song was released as a 45 RPM single in a 4:48 single edit, which has the synthesizer intro and a bar at the finale removed (available on Greatest Hits released by PolyTel in Canada in 1992), with the song "Snowblind" (from their previous album Paradise Theatre) as the B-side.

== Charts ==
=== Weekly charts ===
Weekly chart performance for "Mr. Roboto"
Chart (1983)	Peak position
Australia (Kent Music Report)	40
Austria (Ö3 Austria Top 40)	16
Canada Top Singles (RPM)	1
Switzerland (Schweizer Hitparade)	4
UK Singles (Official Charts)	90
US Billboard Hot 100	3
US Mainstream Rock Airplay (Billboard)	3
US Cash Box Top 100	1
West Germany (GfK)	8
Zimbabwe (ZIMA)	11

=== Year-end charts ===
Year-end chart performance for "Mr. Roboto"
Year-end chart (1983)	Rank
Canada Top Singles (RPM)	20
US Cash Box Top 100	17
US Top Pop Singles (Billboard)	28

== Certifications ==
Certifications and sales for "Mr. Roboto"
Region	Certification	Certified units/sales
Canada (Music Canada)	Gold	50,000^{^}
United States (RIAA)	Gold	1,000,000^{^}
^{^} Shipments figures based on certification alone.
