= Snowblind (Styx song) =

1981 song by Styx

Song by Styx

from the album Paradise Theatre
- A-side: "Rockin' the Paradise"
- Released: 1981
- Recorded: 1980
- Genre: Rock, hard rock
- Length: 4:58 (album version); 3:52 (single edit)
- Label: A&M
- Songwriters: James "J.Y." Young; Dennis DeYoung

"Snowblind" is a song by Styx that appears on the Paradise Theatre album released in 1981. The song is about the helplessness of cocaine addiction, alternating between slow, brooding verses (sung by James Young) and a faster, harder-edged chorus (sung by Tommy Shaw), representing the addict's cycle of highs and lows.

"Snowblind" was written by Dennis DeYoung and Young with uncredited lyrics by Shaw. The single reached #22 on the Mainstream Rock Tracks chart.

Shaw said of the song in 2011:

I had done some research into those lyrics. Everybody was doing it back then – it's not my excuse, but it was just what you did. If you were going to a party back in those days, cocaine was just one of the things on the menu. I never did heroin, because I thought that meant I was doing heavy drugs, which shows you the insanity of doing drugs. I probably should have done heroin, because I understand heroin actually makes you feel good. Cocaine just makes you stupid.

== Controversy ==
Claims were made by anti-rock-music activists during the early 1980s that the song's lyrics were Satanic and contained hidden backwards messages. The line "I try so hard to make it so" when played in reverse was alleged to be "Satan moves through our voices". Aural inspection however suggests that any resemblance the line's reversed phonemes had to this phrase was slight, and likely coincidental. The protestors used "Snowblind" as one of several examples of rock songs that they claimed contained hidden Satanic phrases, and they lobbied the Arkansas State Senate for laws to require warning labels on records containing such messages. Later the Parents Music Resource Center and leader Tipper Gore condemned the song as "Satanic".

Styx repeatedly and angrily dismissed these claims as baseless. Dennis DeYoung told Dallas radio show In the Studio host Redbeard that "Anyone who plays their records backwards is the Antichrist. We have enough trouble making these records sound right forward. People have nothing better to do. It's the name Styx (which means the river in the underground). Can you imagine attacking the guys who made "Babe"? I mean, please."

Despite the band's protests, fundamentalist Christian groups were able to influence the Arkansas State Senate to pass a bill requiring that all records containing backward masking be labeled as such by the manufacturer. Cited in the legislation were albums by The Beatles, Pink Floyd, Electric Light Orchestra, Queen, and Styx.

Partly as a response to the Arkansas ruling, the band created the concept album Kilroy Was Here, which included genuine backwards messages mocking their critics. "Snowblind" was the B-side of the album's first single, "Mr. Roboto".

== Personnel ==
- Dennis DeYoung - keyboards, vocals
- James Young - lead guitar, co-lead vocals
- Tommy Shaw - rhythm guitar, co-lead vocals
- Chuck Panozzo - bass guitar
- John Panozzo - drums
