= Love at First Sight (Styx song) =

Single by Styx

from the album Edge of the Century
- B-side: "World Tonite"
- Released: March 1991
- Recorded: 1989
- Genre: Soft rock
- Length: 4:37
- Label: A&M
- Songwriter(s): Glen Burtnik; Dennis DeYoung; James "J.Y." Young
- Producer(s): Dennis DeYoung

Styx singles chronology
"Show Me the Way" (1990)	"Love at First Sight" (1991)	"Paradise" (1997)

"Love at First Sight" is a song by Styx. It was released in 1991 as the third single from their 1990 album Edge of the Century and peaked at number 25 on the Billboard Hot 100.

It is the band's last Top 40 hit on the Billboard Hot 100 (and their last entry to date), peaking at number 25 on the week of June 15, 1991. The song also fared well on the Adult Contemporary chart, peaking at number 13. It is the last Styx song to chart on the Billboard Hot 100.

The music video is set in Chicago and features a young couple falling in love interspersed with scenes of the band performing.

== Charts ==
Chart (1991)	Peak position
Canada RPM Top 100	18
US Billboard Hot 100	25
US Adult Contemporary (Billboard)	13
