= Love Is the Ritual =

Single by Styx

from the album Edge of the Century
- B-side: "Homewrecker"
- Released: October 1990
- Genre: Funk metal, glam metal
- Length: 3:48
- Label: A&M
- Songwriters: Glen Burtnik; Plinky Giglio
- Producer: Styx

Styx singles chronology
"Music Time" (1984)	"Love Is the Ritual" (1990)	"Show Me the Way" (1990)

"Love Is the Ritual" is the first single released from Edge of the Century by Styx.

== Background ==
The song was written and sung by Glen Burtnik, who had been recruited by the band as a new guitarist. Shaw was at that time busy as a member of the group Damn Yankees.

Burtnik had recorded the track before he was offered a position with Styx in anticipation of using it for his third solo album. The track was re-recorded during recording sessions as Styx. Burtnik's original version was later released on his compilation album Retrospectable.

The song also appeared on the B-side of the 7" single release of "Carrie Ann" (A&M Records – 390 610-7) which had been only released in Europe.

The song's music video was directed by Michael Bay.

== Charts ==
"Love Is the Ritual" was a disappointment commercially. It peaked at only number 80 on the Billboard Top 100 Singles chart. However, it fared better on the Billboard Mainstream Rock Tracks chart, where it attained number 9. It also reached number 59 on the Canada RPM Top Singles chart the week of November 24, 1990.

== Track listing ==
7"

1. "Love Is the Ritual"
2. "Homewrecker"

12" picture disc

1. "Love Is the Ritual"
2. "Homewrecker"
3. "Babe"

== Personnel ==
- Glen Burtnik – lead vocals, lead guitar
- Dennis DeYoung – keyboards, backing vocals
- James Young – rhythm guitar, backing vocals
- Chuck Panozzo – bass
- John Panozzo – drums
