= Sing for the Day =

Single by Styx

from the album Pieces of Eight
- B-side: "Queen of Spades"
- Released: October 1978 (EU); December 1978 (US)
- Recorded: 1978
- Genre: Progressive rock; pop rock
- Length: 4:57
- Label: A&M
- Songwriter: Tommy Shaw
- Producer: Styx

Styx singles chronology
"Blue Collar Man" (1978)	"Sing for the Day" (1978)	"Renegade" (1979)

"Sing for the Day" is a song by the American rock band Styx, released as the second single from their album Pieces of Eight. It reached #41 on the U.S. Billboard Hot 100 pop singles chart in February 1979. It was later the B-side of their next single "Renegade". Tommy Shaw used the name "Hannah" in the song, to represent his fans. Several years later, he named his newborn daughter Hannah. The album version that lasts 4:57, was edited down to 3:40 for the single version.

Reviewing the single version, Billboard felt that the "swirling keyboards and searing guitars" made it sound like a Yes song. Cash Box said that it has "a bright soaring vocal arrangement and musical backing of acoustic guitars, mandolin, tambourine, moderate beat and excellent synthesizer work". Record World said that "The strong vocal harmony hook is pop perfect."

A promotional video was filmed directed by Bruce Gowers which has Styx playing on stage with Tommy Shaw on mandolin and vocals, James "J.Y." Young on acoustic guitar (even though he does not play on the track), Chuck and John Panozzo on bass guitars and drums respectively, and Dennis DeYoung on tambourine and backing vocals (for the band performance scenes) and keyboards (during the keyboard solos).

== Personnel ==
- Tommy Shaw – lead vocals, lead guitar, mandolin, autoharp
- James "JY" Young – rhythm guitar, backing vocals
- Dennis DeYoung – keyboards, backing vocals
- Chuck Panozzo – bass
- John Panozzo – drums, percussion

== Charts ==
Chart (1978–1979)	Peak position
Canada Top Singles (RPM)	27
Netherlands (Single Top 100)	18
US Billboard Hot 100	41
