= Kilroy Was Here (album) =

Studio album by Styx
- Released: February 22, 1983
- Recorded: 1982
- Studios: Pumpkin Studios, Oak Lawn, Illinois
- Genres: Pop rock, arena rock, new wave
- Length: 40:41
- Label: A&M
- Producer: Styx

Styx chronology
Paradise Theatre (1981)	Kilroy Was Here (1983)	Caught in the Act (1984)

Singles from Kilroy Was Here
- 1. "Mr. Roboto" Released: February 1983; 2. "Don't Let It End" Released: April 1983; 3. "High Time" Released: August 1983

Professional ratings
Review scores
Source	Rating
AllMusic	2.5/5 stars
The Daily Vault	B−
Rolling Stone	2/5 stars
The Rolling Stone Album Guide	3/5 stars
Sounds	2.5/5 stars
Sputnikmusic	3.5/5 stars

Kilroy Was Here is the eleventh studio album by the American rock band Styx, released on February 22, 1983. A concept album and rock opera about a world where rock music is outlawed, it is named after a famous World War II graffiti tag, "Kilroy was here". It was the last album of original material to be released by the "classic" lineup of Dennis DeYoung, Tommy Shaw, James "J.Y." Young, John Panozzo, and Chuck Panozzo.

The album spawned two hit singles, the synth-pop "Mr. Roboto" which later became one of their signature songs, and the power ballad "Don't Let It End". Both of them were major hits in 1983, peaking at No. 3 and No. 6 respectively, on the US Billboard Hot 100.

The album is certified platinum by the RIAA. It is the most recent studio album by the band to be certified platinum. In 2022, Rolling Stone ranked the album #50 on their list of the 50 Greatest Concept Albums of All Time.

== Background ==
The band created the album Kilroy Was Here partly to mockingly respond to Christian groups and other anti-rock-music activists who had previously influenced the Arkansas State Senate to pass a bill requiring that all records containing backmasking be labeled as such by the manufacturer. Cited in the legislation were albums by the Beatles, Pink Floyd, Led Zeppelin, Electric Light Orchestra, Queen, and Styx themselves. ELO similarly responded with its own 1983 album Secret Messages.

The hard rocker "Heavy Metal Poisoning", the fifth track on the album, begins with the backmasked Latin words "annuit cœptis, novus ordo seclorum". Translated from the Latin, these words mean "[he] has favored our undertakings, a new order of the ages." These are the two mottoes from the Great Seal of the United States on the reverse side of the United States one-dollar bill.

The album's somewhat rock-operatic story tells of a future in which a fascist and theocratic government and the "MMM (the Majority for Musical Morality)" have outlawed rock music. The story's protagonist, Robert Orin Charles Kilroy (the initials of which spell out "ROCK", played by DeYoung), is a former rock star who has been imprisoned by MMM leader Dr. Everett Righteous (Young). He escapes using a disguise (according to the album's song "Mr. Roboto") when he becomes aware that a young musician, Jonathan Chance (Shaw), is on a mission to bring rock music back.

Vocalist and keyboardist Dennis DeYoung conceived Kilroy Was Here as an album and accompanying stage show, which opened with a short film of the same name. According to the episode of Behind the Music featuring Styx, the early part of the supporting tour was a financial disaster, due to the fact that Styx had booked small, theater-sized venues for a more intimate experience, while later tour dates saw the group performing in large arenas to sold-out crowds. The album debuted at No. 10 on the Billboard 200 in its first week and sold over 1 million copies (although some sources say 2.5 million copies) and peaked at No. 3 on the US charts; however, it broke the streak of multi-platinum albums for Styx, and ushered in a more keyboard-oriented, theatrical direction.

In an interview with the Chicago Tribune, James Young talked about the creative differences in the band, and what led to their breakup: "Dennis really wanted to do these soft, intimate love ballads, and that was against the grain for me and Tommy Shaw, so our differences got magnified, because Dennis was insisting on going outside the boundaries we lived with. He's an assertive and strongly opinionated guy."

Despite the album's financial and chart success, after the Kilroy tour, the songs were not performed live by Styx (which fired DeYoung in 1999) in subsequent tours (with the exception of segments from "Mr. Roboto" and "Heavy Metal Poisoning" performed in the "Cyclo-medley"), until "Mr. Roboto" reappeared in full in their encore on May 30, 2018, as a cover of the Protomen's cover of the song. DeYoung does perform the songs "Mr. Roboto" and "Don't Let It End" regularly during his solo tours. The James Young Group performed "Heavy Metal Poisoning" and "Double Life" as well on their tour in 1993.

== Music video ==
Three of the four videos for the album, "Mr. Roboto", "Don't Let It End", and "Heavy Metal Poisoning", were filmed at the same time and used footage from the minifilm. A fourth video, "Haven't We Been Here Before", was filmed a few months after the album was released; it did not interact with the album's story.

== Track listing ==
Side one
No.	Title	Writer(s)	Lead vocals Lead guitar	Length
1.	"Mr. Roboto"	DeYoung	DeYoung; Shaw	5:28
2.	"Cold War"	Shaw	Shaw; Young	4:27
3.	"Don't Let It End"	DeYoung	DeYoung; Shaw	4:56
4.	"High Time"	DeYoung	DeYoung; Shaw	4:33

Side two
No.	Title	Writer(s)	Lead vocals Lead guitar	Length
1.	"Heavy Metal Poisoning"	Young	Young	4:57
2.	"Just Get Through This Night"	Shaw	Shaw	6:06
3.	"Double Life"	Young	Young	3:46
4.	"Haven't We Been Here Before"	Shaw	Shaw, DeYoung; Young	4:06
5.	"Don't Let It End" (Reprise)	DeYoung	Shaw, DeYoung; Shaw	2:22

== Personnel ==
=== Styx ===
- Dennis DeYoung – vocals, keyboards, accordion
- James "JY" Young – vocals, guitars, vocoder
- Tommy Shaw – vocals, guitars, shamisen, vocoder
- Chuck Panozzo – bass
- John Panozzo – drums, percussion

=== Additional personnel ===
- Steve Eisen – saxophone
- Dan Barber – horn
- Mike Halpin – horn
- Michael Mossman – trumpet
- Mark Ohlsen – horn

=== Production ===
- Arranged & produced by Styx
- Engineers: Gary Loizzo, Will Rascati, Rob Kingsland
- Apprentice engineer: Jim Popko
- Mastering by Ted Jensen at Sterling Sound, NYC

== Charts ==
=== Weekly charts ===
Chart (1983)	Peak position
Australian Albums (Kent Music Report)	45
Canada Top Albums/CDs (RPM)	4
Dutch Albums (Album Top 100)	38
German Albums (Offizielle Top 100)	7
Norwegian Albums (VG-lista)	3
Swedish Albums (Sverigetopplistan)	6
UK Albums (Official Charts)	67
US Billboard 200	3

=== Year-end charts ===
Chart (1983)	Position
Canada Top Albums/CDs (RPM)	22
German Albums (Offizielle Top 100)	35
US Billboard 200	24

== Certifications and sales ==
Region	Certification	Certified units/sales
Canada (Music Canada)	Platinum	100,000^{^}
United States (RIAA)	Platinum	1,000,000^{^}
^{^} Shipments figures based on certification alone.
