= Crystal Ball (Styx song) =

Single by Styx

from the album Crystal Ball
- B-side: "Put Me On"
- Released: June 1977
- Recorded: 1976
- Genre: Rock; folk rock
- Label: A&M
- Songwriter: Tommy Shaw

Styx singles chronology
"Mademoiselle" (1976)	"Crystal Ball" (1977)	"Come Sail Away" (1977)

"Crystal Ball" is the title track and second single released from Styx's Crystal Ball album. It was written by guitarist Tommy Shaw who had just recently joined the band. A live version from 1979 was included on the soundtrack for the 1980 film Roadie. The live version is also available on a Japan-only Styx compilation released in 1981 on LP and on CD in 1986.

== Personnel ==
- Tommy Shaw - lead vocals, acoustic and electric lead guitar
- Dennis DeYoung - keyboards, backing vocals
- James Young - electric rhythm guitar, backing vocals
- Chuck Panozzo - bass
- John Panozzo - drums
