= Pieces of Eight =

- Cover by Hipgnosis

Studio album by Styx
- Released: September 1978
- Recorded: 1978
- Studios: Paragon, Chicago; St. James Cathedral, Chicago
- Genres: Progressive rock; hard rock
- Length: 42:18
- Label: A&M
- Producer: Styx

Styx chronology
The Grand Illusion (1977)	Pieces of Eight (1978)	Cornerstone (1979)

Singles from Pieces of Eight
- 1. "Blue Collar Man (Long Nights)" Released: September 1978; 2. "Sing for the Day" Released: October 1978 (EU); 3. "Renegade" Released: March 1979

Pieces of Eight is the eighth studio album by the American progressive rock band Styx, released in September 1978.

Like the band's previous album, The Grand Illusion (1977), it managed to achieve triple platinum certification, thanks to the hit singles "Blue Collar Man (Long Nights)" and "Renegade".

The band members produced and recorded the album (like their previous three efforts) at Paragon Studios in Chicago with recording engineer Barry Mraz and mixing engineer Rob Kingsland. "I'm O.K." was recorded at Paragon and St. James Cathedral. This would be the last Styx album to be produced at Paragon Studios.

The album's cover was done by Hipgnosis. Dennis DeYoung stated in the 1991 interview with Redbeard on the In the Studio with Redbeard episode that he initially hated the cover but grew to like it as he got older.

== Background ==
The record is considered by some to be Styx's most obvious concept album, as well as the last Styx album with significant progressive rock leanings. The theme of the album, as Dennis DeYoung explained on In the Studio with Redbeard which devoted an entire episode to Pieces of Eight, was about "not giving up your dreams just for the pursuit of money and material possessions".

== Reception ==
Professional ratings
Review scores
Source	Rating
AllMusic	4/5 stars
Christgau's Record Guide	C−
The Rolling Stone Album Guide	2.5/5 stars
Sputnikmusic	5/5 stars

Rolling Stone reviewer Lester Bangs was critical of the album, writing that "what's really interesting is not that such narcissistic slop should get recorded, but what must be going on in the minds of the people who support it in such amazing numbers. Gall, nerve and ego have never been far from great rock & roll. Yet there's a thin but crucial line between those qualities and what it takes to fill arenas today: sheer self-aggrandizement on the most puerile level. If these are the champions, gimme the cripples." The Globe and Mail noted that "when Styx strays too far from its rock and roll foundations ... as on the Gothic-pretentious numbers by Dennis DeYoung like 'Lords of the Ring', it starts getting less credible."

Mike DeGagne of AllMusic has retrospectively praised the album, saying that the songs on the album "rekindle some of Styx's early progressive rock sound, only cleaner."

Classic Rock included Pieces of Eight on their list of the 20 best rock albums from 1978.

The album peaked at No. 6 on the Billboard album chart, and like its predecessor would go triple platinum.

== Track listing ==
Side one
No.	Title	Writer(s)	Lead vocals	Length
1.	"Great White Hope"	James "J.Y." Young	Young, Dennis DeYoung (spoken intro)	4:22
2.	"I'm O.K."	DeYoung, Young	DeYoung	5:41
3.	"Sing for the Day"	Tommy Shaw	Shaw	4:57
4.	"The Message"	DeYoung	instrumental	1:08
5.	"Lords of the Ring"	DeYoung	Young	4:33

Side two
No.	Title	Writer(s)	Lead vocals	Length
6.	"Blue Collar Man (Long Nights)"	Shaw	Shaw	4:05
7.	"Queen of Spades"	Young, DeYoung	DeYoung	5:38
8.	"Renegade"	Shaw	Shaw	4:16
9.	"Pieces of Eight"	DeYoung	DeYoung	4:44
10.	"Aku-Aku"	Shaw	Shaw	2:57

== Personnel ==
=== Styx ===
- Dennis DeYoung – vocals, keyboards
- James "JY" Young – vocals, guitars
- Tommy Shaw – vocals, guitars, mandolin, autoharp
- Chuck Panozzo – bass
- John Panozzo – drums, percussion

=== Production ===
- Producer: Styx
- Engineers: Rob Kingsland, Barry Mraz
- Assistant engineer: Harry Andronis, Gary Geppert
- Mastered by Ted Jensen at Sterling Sound, NYC
- Cover by Hipgnosis

== Charts ==
=== Weekly charts ===
Chart (1978)	Peak position
Australia Albums (Kent Music Report)	70
Canada Top Albums/CDs (RPM)	3
Dutch Albums (Album Top 100)	24
Swedish Albums (Sverigetopplistan)	30
US Billboard 200	6

=== Year-end charts ===
Chart (1978)	Position
Canada Top Albums/CDs (RPM)	29
Chart (1979)	Position
Canada Top Albums/CDs (RPM)	94
US Billboard 200	7

== Certifications ==
Certifications for Pieces of Eight
Region	Certification	Certified units/sales
Canada (Music Canada)	Platinum	100,000^{^}
United States (RIAA)	3× Platinum	3,000,000^{^}
^{^} Shipments figures based on certification alone.

== Singles ==
Year	Single	Chart	Position
1978	"Blue Collar Man (Long Nights)"	US Pop Singles	21
1979	"Sing for the Day"	US Pop Singles	41
1979	"Renegade"	US Pop Singles	16
