= Glen Burtnik =

American musician

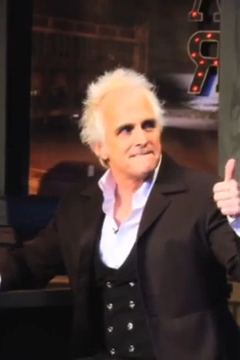

Background information
- Born: Glenn Burtnick; April 8, 1955 (age 71); Irvington, New Jersey, United States
- Genres: Pop; rock; hard rock
- Occupations: Musician; singer; songwriter
- Instruments: Vocals; bass; guitar
- Years active: 1978–present
- Label: Independent
- Member of: The Orchestra
- Formerly of: Styx, Schon & Hammer
- Website: www.theorchestra.net

Glen Burtnik (born Glenn Burtnick; April 8, 1955) is an American singer, songwriter, entertainer and multi-instrumentalist, best known as a member of Styx from 1990 to 1991 and again from 1999 to 2003. Originally from North Brunswick, New Jersey, he lives on the Jersey Shore in Asbury Park. Burtnik has written hit songs for Randy Travis, Patty Smyth and Don Henley.

== Life and career ==
Born in Irvington, New Jersey, Burtnik was raised in North Brunswick, New Jersey, and graduated from New Brunswick High School.

The spelling of his name has shortened a few times over the years (born Glenn Burtnick, then changed to Glen Burtnick, and finally Glen Burtnik, spelled with one N in his first name and no C in his last name).

Burtnik appeared in the Broadway production of Beatlemania as Paul McCartney, alongside Marshall Crenshaw, who played John Lennon. He continues his love of The Beatles to this day, with the tribute band Liverpool. This band are regular performers at The Fest For Beatles Fans, annually held in the Metropolitan New York City area and Chicago, Illinois with occasional stops elsewhere.

He has co-written songs such as "Sometimes Love Just Ain't Enough" with Patty Smyth, "Spirit of a Boy, Wisdom of a Man" with Trey Bruce, and "Delicious Surprise (I Believe It)" and "Fat Man" with blues belter Beth Hart; hosted the School of Rock radio show on The Hawk 105.7 FM; and recorded, toured, and/or collaborated with many other artists. As a member of Styx, he was featured on the hit album Edge of the Century, on which he wrote (along with long-time associate, Plinky Giglio) the top ten mainstream rock hit, "Love Is the Ritual", and co-wrote (with lead singer Dennis DeYoung) the last Billboard Top 40 hit for the band, "Love at First Sight" (No. 25, 1991). Styx broke up again, after being active for only two years since their previous break up. Styx got back together again four years later, but Burtnik did not join because Tommy Shaw quit Damn Yankees and came back with Styx. Burtnik rejoined Styx in late 1999, as original bassist Chuck Panozzo could not play full time anymore because of illness. Thus, Burtnik took over playing the bass guitar and Styx started playing songs from Edge of the Century live again. He went on to record Cyclorama with Styx in 2003, leading on two songs. Burtnik's song "Kiss Your Ass Goodbye" was made and recorded before Cyclorama, but they rerecorded it and put it on the album. Burtnik also sang lead on the song "Killing the Thing That You Love", and shared vocals with Shaw on "Yes I Can". Burtnik left a year later in 2004 being replaced with bassist Ricky Phillips.

He was a member of LaBamba and The Hubcaps led by Richie Rosenberg, before leaving to start his solo career in 1986. One of the Hubcaps' popular songs was the Burtnik-written "Here Comes Sally", which later appeared on Burtnik's 1987 solo LP Heroes & Zeros.

While solo success has been relatively elusive, he did score a minor hit in 1987 with "Follow You," a track off his Heroes & Zeros album, which peaked at No. 65 on the Billboard Hot 100. Follow-up releases have been less successful.

In 1989, Burtnik performed the song "Not So Far Away" for the film Bill & Ted's Excellent Adventure.

One of his songs, "Face in the Mirror", was used in a series of TV commercials for Philishave electric shavers in the 1990s. Burtnik officially left Styx in 2003, because he wanted to be closer to home.

In 2006, Dennis DeYoung asked him to be a part of his band for selected shows to help promote his CD One Hundred Years from Now, which was released in Canada in 2007 and in the US in 2009. Burtnik performed with DeYoung some of the material he wrote with Styx during the Edge of the Century album including "Love Is the Ritual" and "Edge of the Century".

Burtnik and his family were featured on the season premiere episode of the Discovery Channel show, It Takes a Thief, which aired on October 16, 2006. During the second season of this show, Burtnik and his family were the "victims" of a staged robbery.

Since 2009, he has regularly performed with the ELO splinter group The Orchestra, replacing the late Kelly Groucutt on bass and vocals.

Glen Burtnik's Xmas Xtravaganza is a regular holiday concert which benefits area food banks and other worthwhile charities. It features a cast which changes from year to year, but in the past has included artists such as Patty Smyth, John McEnroe, Phoebe Snow, Marshall Crenshaw, The Patti Smith Band, Fred Schneider (B-52's), Jill Sobule, Idina Menzel, Jeffrey Gaines, Freedy Johnston, Dan Bern, John Waite, Curtis Stigers, Styx, Mary Lee Kortes, and Willie Nile, amongst others. The 2008 show featured over 100 performers. The 2010 show was staged at the Count Basie Theater in Red Bank, New Jersey, and again featured over 100 performers. Originally started in 1989, the show has been held most years except 1990–1991, making the 2010 Xmas Xtravanganza the 20th Anniversary of this event.

== Discography ==
(Excludes soundtracks and guest appearances/contributions)

=== Solo albums ===
- Talking in Code (January 20, 1986)
- Heroes & Zeros (1987)
- Slaves of New Brunswick (1991) (credited to "Slaves of New Brunswick")
  - technically a "Glen Burtnik and Friends" release, featuring Glen Burtnik and 60 of his friends
- Palookaville (1996)
- Retrospectacle (1996)
- Welcome to Hollywood (2004)
- Solo (You Can Hardly Hear) (2005)
- The Welcome to Hollywood Demos Vol. 1 (2005)

=== Solo singles ===
- "Perfect World" (1986)
- "Little Red House" (1986)
- "Crank It Up" (1986)
- "Heard It on the Radio" (1987)
- "Follow You" (1987)
- "Walls Came Down" (1987)
- "Where Music Lives" (2011)
- "Baby Cinderella Monkeyshine" (feat. Emily Grove) (2011)
- "The Trouble with Sally" (2011)

==== Soundtrack appearances ====
Title	Release	Soundtrack
"Not So Far Away"	1989	Bill & Ted's Excellent Adventure

=== Styx ===
- Edge of the Century (1990)
- Arch Allies: Live at Riverport (with Styx and REO Speedwagon) (2000)
- Styx World: Live 2001
- At the River's Edge: Live in St. Louis (2002)
- Cyclorama (2003)
- 21st Century Live (2003)

=== As a member of other bands, etc. ===
- "I Hate Disco Music" b/w "Ooga Sha La Bango" (single) (1978) (with The Sides)
- Hammer (1979) (with Jan Hammer)
- Helmet Boy (1980) (with Helmet Boy)
- Schon & Hammer (1981) (with Neal Schon & Jan Hammer)
- A Live Christmas Extravaganza (1994) (various artists)
- The Spirit of Asbury Park: Rockin the Jersey Shore (1999) (various artists)
- Stiff Competition: A Tribute to Cheap Trick (2000) (various artists)
- Jersey Jams Jersey Cares (2002) (various artists)

=== The Weeklings ===
- The Weeklings (Monophonic)
- Studio 2 (2016)
- Live at Daryl’s House Club Vol. 1 (2017)
- 3 (2020)
- In Their Own Write (2021 live album)
- Raspberry Park (2024)
