= Renegade (Styx song) =

1979 song by Styx

Single by Styx

from the album Pieces of Eight
- B-side: "Sing for the Day"
- Released: March 1979 (US)
- Recorded: 1978
- Genre: Hard rock
- Length: 4:15
- Label: A&M
- Songwriter: Tommy Shaw
- Producer: Styx

Styx singles chronology
| "Sing for the Day" (1978) | "Renegade" (1979) | "Babe" (1979) |

Red vinyl pressing
- Limited edition release

"Renegade" is a 1979 hit song recorded by the American rock band Styx on their eighth studio album, Pieces of Eight.

Written and sung by singer/guitarist Tommy Shaw, "Renegade" is an uptempo hard rock song from the perspective of a wanted criminal who knows his choices will lead to his death. "Renegade" was a hit on both Canadian and American sales charts, and is often regarded as one of the band's best songs.

== Background ==
The song is a first-person narrative of an outlaw, captured for a bounty, who recognizes that he is about to be executed for his criminal activities. The execution will be by hanging, as the outlaw laments "Hangman is coming down from the gallows, and I don't have very long." Some pressings of the single were made with translucent red vinyl. Years after its release, it remains a staple on classic rock radio playlists, and is usually the final song Styx plays at its concerts.

Although songwriter Tommy Shaw and fellow Styx guitarist James Young usually played lead guitar on their own compositions, Shaw asked Young to take the solo on "Renegade". Young agreed, and returned the favor by allowing Shaw to play lead on his "Half-Penny, Two-Penny" on the Paradise Theatre album. When performed live from 1978 to 1983, drummer John Panozzo increased the tempo of the drum pattern during the guitar solo sections. Also, the track would serve as the drum solo spot for Panozzo during that time frame.

== Reception ==
Cash Box said it "opens with delicate a cappella singing which suddenly breaks into powerful drum beat and rhythm guitar work." Record World called it a "story ballad with high harmony vocals and a strong rock track" and said that it had to be released as a single due to heavy AOR play.

Louder Sound and Billboard ranked "Renegade" at number two and number four, respectively, on their lists of the 10 greatest Styx songs.

== Personnel ==
- Tommy Shaw - lead vocals, rhythm guitar
- Dennis DeYoung - keyboards, backing vocals
- James "JY" Young - lead guitar, backing vocals
- Chuck Panozzo - bass guitar
- John Panozzo - drums

== Charts ==
=== Weekly charts ===
| Chart (1979) | Peak position |
|---|---|
| Canada Top Singles (RPM) | 10 |
| US Billboard Hot 100 | 16 |

=== Year-end charts ===
| Chart (1979) | Peak position |
|---|---|
| Canada Top Singles (RPM) | 93 |
| US Billboard Hot 100 | 67 |

== In popular culture ==
The song is often used in media:

- At Pittsburgh Steelers home games, between the 3rd and 4th quarters, prior to the defense taking the field (especially during close games). This tradition was started by Mike Marchinsky, Senior Manager of Alumni Relations and Youth Football. The song was played at the 2026 NFL draft which took place in Pittsburgh during Steelers player selections.
- MLB relief pitcher David Bednar, a native of Pittsburgh, uses the song as his walk-up music, and has been nicknamed "The Renegade" as a result. During the Yinzerpalooza weekend of July 2023, the Pittsburgh Pirates held a giveaway for a bobblehead of Bednar, who was playing for the Pirates at the time, that plays the song.
- Styx performed the song between periods of the 2011 NHL Winter Classic at the Pittsburgh Steelers' stadium, Heinz Field, on January 1, 2011.
- The song was used as walk-up music by Josh Hader during his tenure with the Milwaukee Brewers. He ceased using the song after leaving the Brewers in 2022.
