= Boat on the River =

Single by Styx

from the album Cornerstone
- B-side: "Borrowed Time"
- Released: March 1980
- Recorded: 1979
- Genre: Folk rock
- Length: 3:10
- Label: A&M
- Songwriter: Tommy Shaw
- Producer: Styx

Styx singles chronology
"Why Me" (1979)	"Boat on the River" (1980)	"Borrowed Time" (1980)

"Boat on the River" is a 1979 song by Styx, from their album Cornerstone. It was released as a single in 1980 in various countries, but not in the band's native United States, where "Borrowed Time" was released instead.

It was popular in several European countries, becoming a top-five hit on the German, Austrian and Swiss charts (reaching number one on the latter).

== Background ==
The song features Tommy Shaw on lead vocals and mandolin, with Dennis DeYoung accompanying on accordion and harmony vocals. In the video for the song, Chuck Panozzo, John Panozzo, and James J.Y. Young play bowed double bass, tambourine/bass drum and acoustic guitar respectively (even though James J.Y. Young does not play on the original recording).

Shaw said of writing the song:

It came about after I bought a mandolin. I thought to myself, "Well, I can play this." But when I got home, it was like, "Oh… no I can’t!" So, if you can’t really play something, you have to make something up… which is what I did...I made up the little progression. I had a four-channel, reel-to-reel tape deck, so I recorded the mandolin part, then added guitar, bass and a vocal, which was enough to make it sound like a little group. But I just did it for myself, thinking, "There’s no way the band’s going to do this."

But Shaw decided to demonstrate the composition to the band and, according to Shaw, "Dennis liked it enough and said, 'Let’s put it on the album.' That’s one thing I like about being a band that’s been so daring over the years: you get to try stuff like that!"

== Reception ==
Allmusic reviewer Mike DeGagne praised both "Boat on the River" and fellow Cornerstone single "Lights" for their "silky harmonies and welcoming choruses". Canadian Press critic Michael Lawson said it has a "Russian folksong flavor" and called it a "showcase for Shaw's balalaika-like mandolin work" The Pittsburgh Press critic Pete Bishop called it a "zippy Mediterranean-style dance on which Tommy Shaw stars on mandolin" and "a fine novelty number." Eric Hegedus of The Morning Call said that the song "charts a new course for Styx" and that "the mandolin and autoharp, both played by Shaw, lend a tranquil Venetian air to the song; you can actually picture yourself floating down a canal in a gondola." On the other hand, Wichita Beacon reviewer Terre Johnson felt that Styx should not have tried a folk song, saying that "it muddles about with a folksy sound without building into anything close to the magnitude, intensity or emotion in the other songs [on Cornerstone].

Classic Rock critic Malcolm Dome rated "Boat on the River" as Styx 8th greatest song, saying that Shaw's mandolin and DeYoung's accordion give the song a "somewhat expressive European flavour, which makes it more than just another power ballad." PopMatters critic David Pike rated it one of the "41 essential pop/rock songs with accordion."

== Cover versions ==
The song has been covered by Seventh Avenue, Guano Apes, and Finland's Riki Sorsa. The song has also been covered by Turkish artist Metin Özülkü, German folk rock band Fiddler's Green, by Bulgarian singer Mimi Ivanova and by Czech singers Jiří Korn and Pavel Vítek with new lyrics by Zdeněk Borovec.

The 1994 Slovenian song "Mlinar na Muri", which immediately became hit and eventually evergreen, with new lyrics by Tomaž Domicelj, sampled the melody of this tune.

In 2023, American artist Joe Vitullo covered the song on his album "Non Noto"

== Track listings ==
7" Single

1. Boat on the River – 3:10
2. Borrowed Time – 4:58

== Personnel ==
- Tommy Shaw - lead vocals, mandolin, acoustic guitar, autoharp
- Dennis DeYoung - accordion, harmony vocals
- Chuck Panozzo - double bass
- John Panozzo - tambourine/bass drum

== Charts ==
Chart (1980)	Peak position
German Singles Chart	5
Austrian Singles Chart	2
South African Top 20	7
Swiss Singles Chart	1
Dutch Top 40	29
Zimbabwe (ZIMA)	18
