= Fooling Yourself (The Angry Young Man) =

- Cover of the 1978 Dutch single

Single by Styx

from the album The Grand Illusion
- B-side: "The Grand Finale"
- Released: February 1978
- Recorded: 1977
- Genre: Progressive rock
- Length: 5:29
- Label: A&M
- Songwriter: Tommy Shaw

Styx singles chronology
"Come Sail Away" (1977)	"Fooling Yourself (The Angry Young Man)" (1978)	"Blue Collar Man (Long Nights)" (1978)

"Fooling Yourself (The Angry Young Man)" is the second single released from Styx's The Grand Illusion (1977) album. On the Billboard Hot 100 pop chart in the U.S., the single peaked at #29 in April 1978. It also hit No. 20 on the Canada RPM Top Singles chart the week of May 6, 1978.

The song was written by guitarist Tommy Shaw, who sings lead vocals on it. It was originally based on Shaw's initial perception of Styx keyboardist Dennis DeYoung — an "angry young man" who viewed the group's successes with a wary eye and grew angry or depressed with every setback. It was only in later years that Shaw began to see himself in the lyrics, and the song took on a more personal meaning to him.

The composition features a number of time signature changes. The intro and outro are performed in 6/8 time, led by Shaw's acoustic guitar tracks and Dennis DeYoung's synthesizer melodies. The vocal sections of the song are in 4/4. The instrumental features a synthesizer solo in 7/4 time, before returning to 4/4 for the final chorus. After a brief intro recap, there is a brief break with two measures of 5/8 time, and then a return to the 6/8 meter, with another synthesizer solo, before fading out.

Record World said that the song "starts acoustically and builds with synthesizers and guitars to a swirling finish." Record World also said that "the message is both positive and cautionary, and several voices add their effect to a likely radio favorite."

== Personnel ==
- Tommy Shaw – lead vocals, acoustic lead guitar
- James Young – electric rhythm guitar, backing vocals
- Dennis DeYoung – keyboards, backing vocals
- Chuck Panozzo – bass
- John Panozzo – drums

== Charts ==
=== Weekly charts ===
Chart (1978)	Peak position
Australian Singles (Kent Music Report)	42
Canada Top Singles (RPM)	20
Netherlands (Single Top 100)	28
US Billboard Hot 100	29
U.S. Cash Box Top 100	12

=== Year-end charts ===
Chart (1978)	Peak position
Canada Top Singles (RPM)	158
