= Rockin' the Paradise =

"A.D. 1928 / Rockin' the Paradise"

Single by Styx

from the album Paradise Theatre
- B-side: "Snowblind"
- Released: November 1981
- Recorded: 1980
- Genre: Rock
- Label: A&M
- Songwriters: Dennis DeYoung; Tommy Shaw; James "J.Y." Young

Styx singles chronology
"Nothing Ever Goes as Planned" (1981)	"A.D. 1928 / Rockin' the Paradise" (1981)	"Mr. Roboto" (1983)

"A.D. 1928 / Rockin' the Paradise" is a song by American rock band Styx, released as the fourth single from their tenth album Paradise Theatre. The song peaked at No. 8 on the Billboard Rock Chart. "A.D. 1928" is a short, piano-based song by Dennis DeYoung, set to the same melody as "The Best of Times", that segues into "Rockin' the Paradise". These two tracks would serve as the opening songs of not only the Paradise Theatre album but also its subsequent tour and the 1996 Return to Paradise reunion tour.

According to Bismarck Tribune critic Patrick Miller, the message of "Rockin' the Paradise" is "for Americans to get back to the honest hard work that made the country great. DeYoung expanded on this saying that that what is needed in order to turn things around in American "common decency between human beings and people feeling useful. One of the biggest crimes in the United States is people not feeling useful. People need to feel like they're a useful part of society because they are. We need to get people to believe in themselves—that they are important.

Newsday critic Wayne Robins felt that some of the lyrics "are worthy of a politician's adventures in locution," for example "Let's stick together and futurize our attitudes / I ain't looking to fight but I know with determination we can challenge the schemers / who cheat all the rules.

Allmusic critic Eduardo Rivadavia called the song "a total team effort of wonderfully stripped down hard rock." Classic Rock critic Malcolm Dome rated "Rockin' the Paradise" as Styx 4th greatest song, praising the "sparkling sense of fun and nostalgia" and the band's "inspired performance."

The music video for the song was the tenth to air on MTV when it debuted in the U.S. on August 1, 1981.

== Personnel ==
- Dennis DeYoung - lead vocals, keyboards
- Tommy Shaw - lead guitar, backing vocals
- James Young - rhythm guitar, backing vocals
- Chuck Panozzo - bass
- John Panozzo - drums
