= Paradise Theatre (album) =

Studio album by Styx
- Released: January 16, 1981
- Recorded: 1980
- Studios: Pumpkin Studios, Oak Lawn, Illinois
- Genres: Progressive rock; arena rock; hard rock; AOR
- Length: 40:37
- Label: A&M
- Producer: Styx

Styx chronology
Cornerstone (1979)	Paradise Theatre (1981)	Kilroy Was Here (1983)

Singles from Paradise Theatre
- 1. "The Best of Times" Released: January 1981; 2. "Too Much Time on My Hands" Released: March 1981; 3. "Nothing Ever Goes as Planned" Released: July 1981; 4. "Rockin' the Paradise/Snowblind" Released: November 1981

Professional ratings
Review scores
Source	Rating
AllMusic	4/5 stars
Classic Rock	3.5/5 stars
The Daily Vault	A (2003); C (2006)
The Rolling Stone Album Guide	2.5/5 stars
Sputnikmusic	4.5 stars

Paradise Theatre is the tenth studio album by the American rock band Styx, released on January 16, 1981, by A&M Records. It was the band's most commercially successful album, peaking at #1 for three weeks on the Billboard 200 in April and May 1981 (non-consecutively). It was also the band's fourth consecutive album to be certified multi-platinum by the RIAA.

Four singles from the album charted on various charts, with two songs reaching the top 10 pop singles chart. The lead single "The Best of Times", written by Dennis DeYoung, went to #3 on the Billboard Hot 100. "Too Much Time on My Hands", written by Tommy Shaw, went to #9 on the Billboard Hot 100, Shaw's only top 10 hit for Styx. "Nothing Ever Goes as Planned", written by DeYoung, went to #54 on the US Pop Chart. "Rockin' the Paradise"—written by DeYoung, Shaw and James Young—went to #8 on the Top Rock Track Chart.

== Concept ==
A concept album, Paradise Theatre is a fictionalized account of Chicago's Paradise Theatre from its opening in 1928 to its closing in 1956 (and subsequent demolition), used as a metaphor for America's changing times from the late 1970s into the 1980s. (Dennis DeYoung, who envisioned and developed the entire concept, confirmed this in an episode of In the Studio with Redbeard about the making of the album.)

DeYoung has said that the theme of the album is "one of hope and renewal in the spirit of the American people to understand the problems that confront the world and this country and find solutions themselves to those problems. Don't depend on heroes to do what you must do for yourself. If you hate your job but you have a dream, then pursue it. Just don't sit around and complain about it."

Newsday critic Wayne Robins stated that the songs "deal with people out of sync with themselves and their environment." For example, "Too Much Time on My Hands" is about a man who is unemployed and has given up, he regards "Lonely People" as a "contemporary rewrite of the Beatles' 'Eleanor Rigby,'" and "Nothing Ever Goes as Planned" is about "the inevitability of failure."

== Vinyl edition ==
Initial vinyl copies of the album have a design featuring the name of the band laser-etched directly onto the vinyl on side 2 (some copies had a wax design of the cover art). The vinyl record sleeve was a gatefold and was painted by artist Chris Hopkins.

== Track listing ==
Side one
No.	Title	Writer(s)	Lead vocals	Length
1.	"A.D. 1928"	DeYoung	DeYoung	1:08
2.	"Rockin' the Paradise"	DeYoung, Young, Shaw	DeYoung	3:35
3.	"Too Much Time on My Hands"	Shaw	Shaw	4:31
4.	"Nothing Ever Goes as Planned"	DeYoung	DeYoung	4:48
5.	"The Best of Times"	DeYoung	DeYoung	4:19

Side two
No.	Title	Writer(s)	Lead vocals	Length
6.	"Lonely People"	DeYoung	DeYoung	5:28
7.	"She Cares"	Shaw	Shaw	4:17
8.	"Snowblind"	Young, DeYoung	Young, Shaw	5:00
9.	"Half-Penny, Two-Penny"	Young, Ray Brandle	Young	5:58
10.	"A.D. 1958"	DeYoung	DeYoung	1:06
11.	"State Street Sadie"	DeYoung	instrumental	0:28

== Personnel ==
=== Styx ===
- Dennis DeYoung – vocals, keyboards
- James "JY" Young – vocals, guitars
- Tommy Shaw – vocals, guitars, vocoder
- Chuck Panozzo – bass, bass pedals
- John Panozzo – drums, percussion

=== Additional personnel ===
- Steve Eisen – saxophone solos
- Bill Simpson – saxophones
- Mike Halpin – trombone
- John Haynor – trombone
- Dan Barber – trumpet
- Mark Ohlsen – trumpet, flugelhorn
- Ed Tossing – horn arrangements

=== Production ===
- Styx – producers, arrangements
- Rob Kingsland – engineer
- Gary Loizzo – engineer
- Will Rascoti – assistant engineer
- Ted Jensen – mastering at Sterling Sound, NYC
- Dennis DeYoung – original concept
- Jeffrey Kent Ayeroff – art direction, design
- Chuck Beeson – art direction, design
- Chris Hopkins – illustrations
- Marc Hauser – photography
- Greg Murry – photography
- John Weizenbach – photography

== Charts ==
=== Weekly charts ===
Chart (1981)	Peak position
Argentina (Ránking Argentino)	2
Australian Albums (Kent Music Report)	27
Canada Top Albums/CDs (RPM)	3
Dutch Albums (Album Top 100)	23
German Albums (Offizielle Top 100)	21
New Zealand Albums (RMNZ)	30
Norwegian Albums (VG-lista)	5
Swedish Albums (Sverigetopplistan)	6
UK Albums (Official Charts)	8
US Billboard 200	1

=== Year-end charts ===
Chart (1981)	Position
Canada Top Albums/CDs (RPM)	13
US Billboard 200	6

== Certifications ==
Region	Certification	Certified units/sales
Canada (Music Canada)	Platinum	100,000^{^}
Switzerland (IFPI Switzerland)	Gold	25,000^{^}
United Kingdom (BPI)	Silver	60,000^{^}
United States (RIAA)	3× Platinum	3,000,000^{^}
^{^} Shipments figures based on certification alone.
