= Blue Collar Man (Long Nights) =

Single by Styx

from the album Pieces of Eight
- B-side: "Superstars" / "Aku-Aku"
- Released: September 1978 (US)
- Genre: Hard rock; arena rock
- Length: 4:05 (LP version); 3:37 (single version)
- Label: A&M
- Songwriter: Tommy Shaw

Styx singles chronology
"Fooling Yourself (The Angry Young Man)" (1978)	"Blue Collar Man (Long Nights)" (1978)	"Sing for the Day" (1978)

"Blue Collar Man (Long Nights)" is a song by American rock band Styx, released as the first single from their eighth studio album, Pieces of Eight (1978). Released in 1978, the single came in two 7" vinyl formats: one with the b-side "Superstars" (a track from The Grand Illusion) and a second single with the instrumental album track "Aku-Aku" as the b-side. Some printings of the single were also issued in a translucent blue vinyl, which are now highly sought after collector's items.

== Lyrics and music ==
Tommy Shaw recalled that a friend of his was laid off from the railroad. "He was having to go stand in line at the unemployment office. It just drove him nuts, because he’s like, ‘I wanna work! I don’t wanna be standing around here, asking for a handout…’ It really bugged him, and that was the inspiration for that song.” As read in a Circus magazine (or the like) of the time, the music was composed by Shaw after hearing the sound of his motor boat engine when it failed to start. He said it sounded like a good riff to a song.

The song is in D natural minor, with moments of D harmonic minor due to the use of the V chord, A major.

== Reception ==
According to Billboard, it has "riveting high energy guitar licks and a powerful lead vocal." Cash Box said that "rhythm guitar work provides a gritty, rough and tumble bottom which highlights the bright lead guitar passages and the upper register vocals." Record World praised the organ and guitar playing and said that "Styx has specialized in hard rockers with soaring harmony hooks and this single...is in the same groove." Allmusic critic Mike DeGagne said that it best represents "Styx's feisty, straightforward brand of album rock," who called it "an invigorating keyboard and guitar rush -- hard and heavy, yet curved by Tommy Shaw's emphasized vocals." In 2024, Ultimate Classic Rock critic Allison Rapp rated it to be rock music's 14th best work song, with fellow critic Ryan Reed admiring the song's "grit" and Dennis DeYoung's "heavy" organ playing. Louder Sound and Billboard ranked "Blue Collar Man (Long Nights)" at number five and number eight, respectively, on their lists of the 10 greatest Styx songs.

The song reached #21 in the United States in November 1978, and spent two weeks at No. 9 on the Canada RPM Top 100 Singles chart.

== Personnel ==
- Tommy Shaw – lead vocals, lead guitar
- James Young – rhythm guitar, backing vocals
- Dennis DeYoung – keyboards, backing vocals
- Chuck Panozzo – bass
- John Panozzo – drums

== Charts ==
=== Weekly charts ===
Chart (1978–1979)	Peak position
Australian Singles (Kent Music Report)	98
Canada Top Singles (RPM)	9
Netherlands (Single Top 100)	47
US Billboard Hot 100	21
U.S. Cash Box Top 100	20

=== Year-end charts ===
Chart (1978)	Peak position
Canada Top Singles (RPM)	99
U.S. (Joel Whitburn's Pop Annual)	139

== Music video ==
A promo video for this song was filmed by director Bruce Gowers of the band performing on stage at San Diego Sports Arena during soundcheck for the band’s performance there. Videos were also shot for the Pieces of Eight songs "Sing for the Day" and "I'm OK".

== In popular culture ==
The song was used in the Season 8 episode of The Middle titled "Trip and Fall". A re-recorded version of the song has been released as downloadable content for the Rock Band video game.
