= Too Much Time on My Hands =

Single by Styx

from the album Paradise Theatre
- B-side: "Queen of Spades"
- Released: March 6, 1981
- Recorded: 1980
- Genre: AOR; new wave; hard rock
- Length: 4:31
- Label: A&M
- Songwriter: Tommy Shaw
- Producer: Styx

Styx singles chronology
"The Best of Times" (1981)	"Too Much Time on My Hands" (1981)	"Nothing Ever Goes as Planned" (1981)

"Too Much Time on My Hands" is a song by American rock band Styx, released as the second single from their tenth album Paradise Theatre. It was written and sung by Tommy Shaw, who also plays the lead guitar solo during the break in the song. It was Shaw's only top 10 single as a writer and vocalist with Styx.

== Background ==
The inspiration for its lyrics came from Shaw's experiences in a bar in Niles, Michigan, U.S. The lyrics are about an unemployed man who has "given up hope for the afternoon soaps / and a bottle of cold brew."

== Reception ==
Record World said that "Tommy Shaw's vocal is a perfect vehicle for this message about modern man's boredom and praised the "brisk beat and winding guitars." Allmusic critic Eduardo Rivadavia regarded "Too Much Time on My Hands" as one of Shaw's best singles. Louder Sound and Billboard ranked "Too Much Time on My Hands" at number six and number three, respectively, on their lists of the 10 greatest Styx songs.

== Music video ==
PopMatters critic Dennis Shin rated the video as one of "20 ’80s music videos that have aged terribly," criticizing its cheesiness, the "band's period attire," "mullets galore, perms, girls with feathered hair, and Joe Dirt in the baby blue jumpsuit on vocals."

== Personnel ==
- Tommy Shaw – lead vocals, lead guitar
- Dennis DeYoung – keyboards, backing vocals
- James Young – rhythm guitar, backing vocals
- Chuck Panozzo – bass
- John Panozzo – drums

== Charts ==
It reached #9 on the US Billboard Hot 100 the week of May 23 1981, No. 2 on the Top Rock Tracks chart, and No. 4 on the RPM Top Singles chart of Canada.

=== Weekly charts ===
Chart (1981)	Peak position
Australia (Kent Music Report)	67
Canada Top Singles (RPM)	4
US Billboard Hot 100	9

=== Year-end Charts ===
Year-end chart (1981)	Rank
Canada Top Singles (RPM)	39
US Top Pop Singles (Billboard)	54

== In popular culture ==
- In August 1981, MTV went on the air and gave new life to the song by airing the music video in heavy rotation. The video was one of the few the network had available at the time from an American rock band.
- The song enjoyed a small revival when The Tonight Show host Jimmy Fallon started talking about the music video after hearing the song on the radio in April 2016. This culminated with the episode on April 29, 2016, when Fallon showed a shot-by-shot reenactment of the video with him and guest Paul Rudd on the show. In this video Fallon plays the part of Dennis DeYoung and Rudd plays Tommy Shaw, with A.D. Miles as James Young, Seth Herzog as John Panozzo, and Gerard Bradford as Chuck Panozzo. Tommy Shaw has commented positively and said he was impressed with Fallon's vocals.
- The song was heard in the Close Enough episode "Snailin' It".
