= Regeneration: Volume I & II =

Greatest hits album by Styx
- Released: October 4, 2011
- Recorded: 2010–2011
- Genre: Rock
- Length: 75:00
- Label: Eagle Records
- Producer: Styx, Gary Loizzo

Styx chronology
Big Bang Theory (2005)	Regeneration: Volume I & II (2011)	The Grand Illusion/Pieces of Eight - Live (2012)

Professional ratings
Review scores
Source	Rating
Allmusic	3.5/5 stars
The Daily Vault	D
Record Collector	4/5 stars
Sea of Tranquility	4/5 stars

Regeneration: Volume I & II is a compilation album by the band Styx released in 2011. It consists of re-recordings of classic Styx songs, one new track entitled "Difference in the World" and two Damn Yankees covers. The album was released first as two separate EP releases, Regeneration: Volume 1 in 2010 and Regeneration: Volume 2 in 2011. The EPs were sold on every date of Styx's The Grand Illusion/Pieces of Eight tour, which began October 14, 2010 in Evansville, Indiana, and they were sold at some of their concerts since July 2010, as well as on their website. The album was the last Styx studio release with longtime producer Gary Loizzo before his death in 2016.

== Track listing ==
Volume 1

1. "The Grand Illusion" (Dennis DeYoung)
2. "Fooling Yourself (The Angry Young Man)" (Tommy Shaw)
3. "Lorelei" (Dennis DeYoung/James Young)
4. "Sing for the Day" (Tommy Shaw)
5. "Crystal Ball" (Tommy Shaw)
6. "Come Sail Away" (Dennis DeYoung)
7. "Difference in the World" (Tommy Shaw)

Volume 2

1. "Blue Collar Man (Long Nights)" (Tommy Shaw)
2. "Miss America" (James Young)
3. "Renegade" (Tommy Shaw)
4. "Queen of Spades" (Dennis DeYoung/James Young)
5. "Boat on the River" (Tommy Shaw)
6. "Too Much Time on My Hands" (Tommy Shaw)
7. "Snowblind" (Dennis DeYoung/James Young)
8. "Coming of Age" (Jack Blades/Ted Nugent/Tommy Shaw)
9. "High Enough" (Jack Blades/Ted Nugent/Tommy Shaw)

== Personnel ==
- Tommy Shaw - guitar, vocals
- James Young - guitar, vocals
- Lawrence Gowan - keyboards, vocals
- Ricky Phillips - bass
- Chuck Panozzo - bass on Fooling Yourself
- Todd Sucherman - drums
