= A Criminal Mind =

Single by Lawrence Gowan

from the album Strange Animal
- Released: 15 January 1985
- Studio: Startling Studios (Ascot, Berkshire, England)
- Genre: Progressive rock
- Length: 4:38 (radio edit); 7:21 (album version)
- Label: Columbia
- Songwriter: Lawrence Gowan
- Producer: David Tickle

Lawrence Gowan singles chronology
"Make It Alone" (1982)	"A Criminal Mind" (1985)	"(You're a) Strange Animal" (1985)

"A Criminal Mind" is a song by Scottish-born Canadian artist Lawrence Gowan. Released in January 1985 as the lead single from Gowan's second studio album, Strange Animal, it reached number five in Canada. Gowan refers to it as one of his signature songs.

== Writing ==
"A Criminal Mind" is written as a tragic ballad following the narrator in prison as he reflects on his life of crime. The protagonist refuses to show any remorse for his actions and scoffs at attempts to rehabilitate him, declaring "a criminal mind is... all I've ever known". In the final verse he addresses a court hearing to argue that even though he is doomed to spend life in prison, his lack of a moral conscience in truth renders him freer than his jailers.

Gowan later stated that his inspiration for the song was a Kingston Penitentiary prison cell exhibit at the Canadian National Exhibition (CNE) to represent the Canadian penal system. The empty cell was attended by a single guard, with whom Gowan had a conversation after sitting in the cell alone for a while. The discussion about recidivist inmates led to the creation of the song.

== Longevity ==
In April 1999, Gowan received a call from a member of the band Styx, which was interested in inviting him to fill in for Dennis DeYoung, who refused to perform for concerts. He met the band at the house of Tommy Shaw, where they performed a few songs, the first of which was "A Criminal Mind". The band suggested to make it "a Styx song". After the band's acrimonious split with DeYoung, Gowan was asked to become a permanent member. He agreed, and they performed their first concert together in Branson, Missouri later in 1999. The song appeared on the album Styx World: Live 2001.

As of 2019 "A Criminal Mind" is still on the band's tour set list and is played at most Canadian concerts. This has led to increased awareness of Gowan's musical repertoire amongst Styx fans. As a result, "A Criminal Mind" and other songs in his repertoire, including "Moonlight Desires", "All The Lovers in the World", "(You're a) Strange Animal", and "Guerrilla Soldier", received increased airplay on Boom FM, Q107, and other Toronto radio stations. In 2014, Gowan received three "Classic Music Award" from the Society of Composers, Authors and Music Publishers of Canada for the songs "A Criminal Mind", "Dancing on My Own Ground" and "(You're A) Strange Animal" each having achieved 100,000 radio airplays throughout Canada since their release. Gowan has previously stated he became aware of the increased airplay because of the royalties cheques he receives.

In 2018, "A Criminal Mind" was certified as a platinum single in Canada, surpassing a combined 80,000 physical 7", 12" single and digital downloaded units sold. Gowan was presented with the plaque on stage during a concert at Caesars Windsor in Windsor.

== Music video ==
Upon completion of recording for the album, Gowan collaborated with videographer Rob Quartly to create a music video for the song. They spent two months together, during which they created "a ground-breaking video" with a unique treatment according to Keith Sharp, as well as a music video for the song "(You're A) Strange Animal".

In an interview with Nick Krewen of Music Express magazine, Gowan stated that "videos can be powerful but they are so misused" and that he was "really happy" with the result for this video. Music critic John Griffin of The Gazette referred to as an "amazing video". It won the Juno Award for Best Video at the 1985 Juno Awards. Other nominees included the video for "(You're A) Strange Animal" from the same album, also produced by Quartly, and a third video produced by Quartly, for the song "Never Surrender" by Corey Hart. That year, the song was nominated for the Juno Award for Single of the Year, which was won by Corey Hart for "Never Surrender".

Don Oates, vice president of sales and marketing for Columbia Records, stated that the music video was pivotal in the song receiving airplay in Canada. In an article in The Gazette, Martin Siberok stated that "the role of video" was key to the song appearing on record charts. Kirk LaPointe of Billboard magazine stated that Gowan was the "clearest beneficiary" of the existence of MuchMusic (which had launched in September 1984) as the album Strange Animal achieved double platinum status and Gowan emerged as a "hit domestic artist". In addition, Gowan appeared on a spot for the channel to emphasize that his song is about a criminal mind that needs understanding, while a criminal act is another matter entirely. Despite his domestic success and the album's United States release in May 1985, the song received little airplay in the United States.

Canadian voice actor Len Carlson, who contributed to numerous animated series as well as being a longstanding voice for Kraft Canada, opens the music video with a dramatic voiceover introduction.

== Charts ==
Chart (1985)	Peak position
Canada Adult Contemporary (RPM)	14
Canada Top Singles (RPM)	5
