= Where You Goin' Now =

Single by Damn Yankees

from the album Don't Tread
- B-side: "This Side of Hell"
- Released: September 1992
- Genre: Glam metal
- Length: 4:27
- Label: Warner Bros. 40646 (Europe)
- Songwriters: Jack Blades; Ted Nugent; Tommy Shaw
- Producer: Ron Nevison

Damn Yankees singles chronology
"Bad Reputation" (1991)	"Where You Goin' Now" (1992)	"Don't Tread On Me" (1992)

"Where You Goin' Now" is a song by American hard rock supergroup Damn Yankees. A power ballad, it released in 1992 as a single from their second album, Don't Tread (1992), and peaked at No. 20 on the US Billboard Hot 100, making it their second and final top 40 hit.

== Track listing ==
All songs written by Jack Blades, Ted Nugent & Tommy Shaw.

1. "Where You Going Now" (Edit) – 4:27
2. "Where You Going Now" (Live version) – 4:46
3. "High Enough" (Live version) – 4:36
- Tracks 2 & 3 recorded live from the Rocky Mountain Jam in Denver, Colorado.

== Personnel ==
=== Damn Yankees ===
- Tommy Shaw – guitars, vocals
- Ted Nugent – guitars, vocals
- Jack Blades – bass, vocals
- Michael Cartellone – drums

=== Additional musicians ===
- Robbie Buchanan – keyboards

=== Production ===
- Executive producer – Michael Ostin
- Executive producer – ECM Management/Bruce Bird, Doug Banker and Bud Trager (Tracks 2 & 3)
- Mixing – Chris Lord-Alge
- Engineer – Ron Nevison

== Charts ==
Chart (1992)	Peak position
US Billboard Hot 100	20
US Cash Box Top 100	14
