= Todd Sucherman =

American drummer (born 1969)

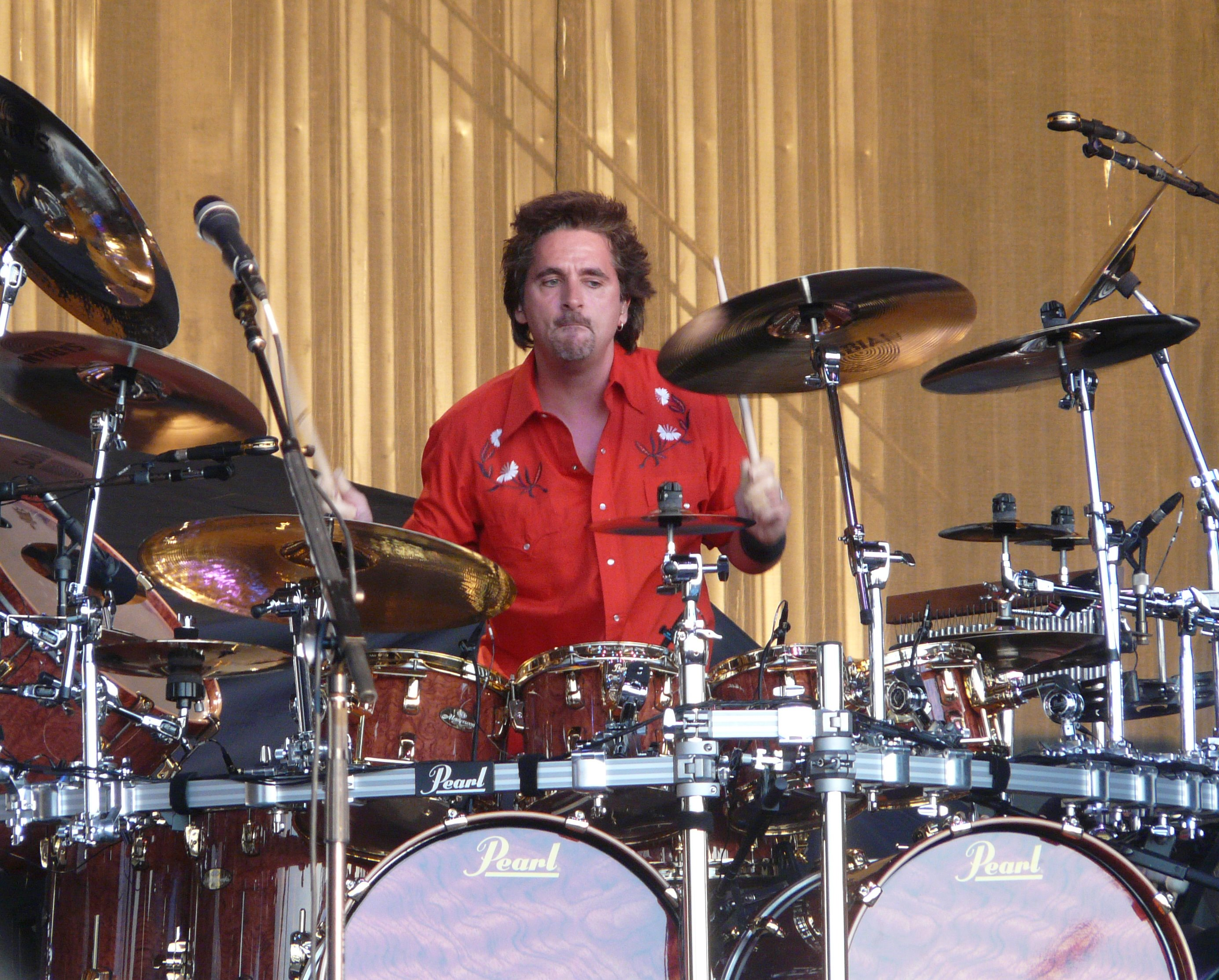
- Todd Sucherman performing with Styx on June 13, 2008, in Hinckley, MN

Background information
- Born: Todd Sucherman; May 2, 1969 (age 57); Chicago, Illinois
- Genres: Hard rock; progressive rock
- Occupation: Musician
- Instruments: Drums; percussion
- Years active: 1987–present
- Member of: Styx; Gowan
- Website: www.toddsucherman.com

Todd Sucherman (born May 2, 1969) is an American drummer, who is best known for being a member of Styx since March 1995.

== Early life ==
Sucherman grew up in a musical family and followed in his father's footsteps by playing the drums. His father, Arnold J. Sucherman, was a doctor by day and a drummer by night, playing in the house band at the famed Chez Paree in Chicago. His mother, Jo (Seiwert) Sucherman, was an actress in the 1950s and 1960s.

Sucherman attended Niles West High School, and then the Berklee College of Music from September 1987 to May 1988.

== Career ==
In 1988, Sucherman returned to Chicago and quickly established himself as a noted session musician. As an in-demand player for live and session work, Sucherman recorded with Styx in March 1995 when they decided to re-record "Lady", now titled "Lady '95", for their 1995 Greatest Hits album, though he was uncredited. In February 1996 when it came time for the Return to Paradise tour and drummer John Panozzo was unable to perform, Styx asked Sucherman to join them for the tour. After John Panozzo's death on July 16, 1996, Sucherman became a full-time member, appearing on the 1997 live album, Return to Paradise.

In 1998, he helped Tommy Shaw of Styx make his solo album 7 Deadly Zens.

In addition to Styx, he has played with such artists as Brian Wilson, Peter Cetera, Brian Culbertson, The Falling Wallendas, Steve Cole, and Spinal Tap, among others. Sucherman also plays with the band of fellow Styx member Lawrence Gowan.

In September 2008, Sucherman was a featured artist in the prestigious Modern Drummer Festival. He also appeared on the cover of the October 2008 issue of Modern Drummer magazine, and in 2009 Modern Drummer Magazine voted him number one Rock Drummer in the World. In 2020, Modern Drummer readers voted him number one Live drummer. In 2021, Music Radar nominated Sucherman for Best Rock drummer. On September 12, 2020, he contributed a solo drum composition and performance entitled "13 for NP" to the twentieth annual edition of the Modern Drummer festival, which paid tribute to Rush drummer and lyricist Neil Peart, who had died earlier in the year.

On May 2, 2020, Sucherman released his 1st solo album Last Flight Home. The album includes a cover of the song "Kindling" by Elbow. There are official music videos for the songs "Last Flight Home", "Ad Lib Everything", "The Damage", and "Kindling". All videos are available on Sucherman's YouTube channel, as well as the video of "Sacred Book Of Favorite Days" from the Last Flight Home Drumless Play Along Package.

== Personal life ==
Sucherman married singer Taylor Mills, whom he met while both were touring with Brian Wilson, on March 30, 2003. On November 30, 2013, Sucherman announced via Instagram that he currently resides in Austin, Texas.

== Discography ==
=== Styx ===
==== Studio albums ====
- Brave New World (1999)
- Cyclorama (2003)
- Big Bang Theory (2005) (Cover Album)
- The Mission (2017)
- Crash of the Crown (2021)
- Circling from Above (2025)

==== Extended plays ====
- Regeneration: Volume I (2010)
- Regeneration: Volume II (2011)
- The Same Stardust (2021)

==== Live albums ====
- Return To Paradise (1997)
- Arch Allies: Live at Riverport (2000)
- StyxWorld: Live 2001 (2001)
- At the River's Edge: Live in St. Louis (2002)
- 21st Century Live (2003)
- One with Everything: Styx and the Contemporary Youth Orchestra (2006)
- The Grand Illusion/Pieces Of Eight Live (2013)
- Live At The Orleans Arena, Las Vegas (2015)

==== Singles and other songs ====
- "Lady '95" (1995) (from Greatest Hits)
- "Little Suzie" (1996) (from Greatest Hits Part 2)
- "It Takes Love" (1996) (from Greatest Hits Part 2)
- "Can't Stop Rockin'" (2009)

=== Spinal Tap ===
- Back from the Dead (2009)

=== Tommy Shaw ===
- 7 Deadly Zens (1998)

=== Finally George ===
- Life Is a Killer (2018)
- Icy Skies (2021)
- PAINTER (2025)

=== Solo ===
- Last Flight Home (2020)

=== Falling Wallendas ===
- Falling Wallendas (1995)
- Belittle (1997)
