= Count on You =

Count on You may refer to:

- "Count on You", a 2010 song by Big Time Rush from BTR
- "Count on You", a 2023 song by Shaun Farrugia
- "Count on You", a 1985 song by Tommy Shaw from What If
