= Crash of the Crown =

Studio album by Styx
- Released: June 18, 2021
- Recorded: 2020–2021
- Studio: The Shop, Studio Amontillado, Blackbird Studio, Blue Sound and Music, Todd's Studio
- Genre: Progressive rock; hard rock
- Length: 43:03
- Label: Universal Music Enterprises
- Producer: Will Evankovich

Styx chronology
The Mission (2017)	Crash of the Crown (2021)	Circling from Above (2025)

Singles from Crash of the Crown
- 1. "Crash of the Crown" Released: May 2021; 2. "Reveries" Released: June 2021

Professional ratings
Review scores
Source	Rating
AllMusic	4/5 stars
Prog Radio	4.5/5 stars

Crash of the Crown is the seventeenth studio album by American rock band Styx. The album was released on June 18, 2021, by Universal Music Enterprises. The album charted for one week on the US Billboard 200 album chart, peaking at No. 114 on July 3, 2021. The album produced no singles that charted on any Billboard singles chart. This was also the last album to feature bassist Ricky Phillips as he would leave the band to spend more time with his family.

== Track listing ==
No.	Title	Writer(s)	Lead vocals	Length
1.	"The Fight of Our Lives"	Tommy Shaw; Will Evankovich	Group	1:54
2.	"A Monster"	Shaw; Evankovich; Lawrence Gowan	Shaw, Group	3:27
3.	"Reveries"	Shaw; Evankovich	Gowan	3:03
4.	"Hold Back the Darkness"	Shaw; Evankovich	Gowan, Shaw	3:58
5.	"Save Us from Ourselves"	Shaw; Evankovich; Gowan	Shaw	3:02
6.	"Crash of the Crown"	Shaw; Evankovich; Gowan	Young, Shaw, Gowan	3:46
7.	"Our Wonderful Lives"	Shaw; Evankovich	Shaw	3:06
8.	"Common Ground"	Shaw; Evankovich; Gowan	Shaw, Gowan	4:00
9.	"Sound the Alarm"	Shaw; Evankovich	Shaw	3:25
10.	"Long Live the King"	Evankovich	Shaw	2:33
11.	"Lost at Sea"	Gowan	Gowan	0:38
12.	"Coming Out the Other Side"	Shaw; Evankovich; Ricky Phillips	Gowan	3:48
13.	"To Those"	Shaw; Evankovich	Group, Gowan	3:01
14.	"Another Farewell"	Evankovich	Instrumental	0:26
15.	"Stream"	Shaw	Group, Shaw	2:56
Total length:				43:03

Apart from their 2005 covers album Big Bang Theory, this is the first Styx album since Styx II (1973) to feature no songwriting contribution from James "J.Y." Young.

== Personnel ==
=== Styx ===
- Tommy Shaw – vocals, acoustic and electric guitars, mandolin, banjo
- James Young – electric guitars, vocals
- Ricky Phillips – bass guitar except on "Our Wonderful Lives" and "Lost at Sea"
- Chuck Panozzo – bass guitar on "Our Wonderful Lives" and "Lost at Sea"
- Lawrence Gowan – vocals, piano, Hammond B-3 organ, synthesizers, Mellotron
- Todd Sucherman – drums, percussion

=== Additional personnel ===
- Will Evankovich – acoustic and electric guitars, mandolin, synthesizers, soundscapes, percussion, backing vocals
- Michael Bahan – tablas on "Coming Out the Other Side"
- Steve Patrick – piccolo trumpet on "Our Wonderful Lives"

=== Production ===
- Production – Will Evankovich
- Engineering – Alan Hertz, JR Taylor, Scott Rottler, Russ Mackay, Sean Badum, Devan Skaggs, Will Evankovich
- Mixing – Will Evankovich, Alan Hertz
- Mastering – Ted Jensen
- Art Direction, Design, Illustration – Todd Gallopo
- Liner notes – Mike Mettler
- Band photography – Styx
- Management – Charlie Brusco
- Booking agent – Rod Essig
- A&R supervision – Mike Ruthig
- Production manager – Alex Sale
- Product manager – Ashley Harris
- Legal clearances – Andrew Labarrere

== Charts ==
Chart (2021)	Peak position
Belgian Albums (Ultratop Flanders)	167
German Albums (Offizielle Top 100)	26
Scottish Albums (OCC)	23
Swiss Albums (Schweizer Hitparade)	17
UK Rock & Metal Albums (OCC)	4
US Billboard 200	114
US Top Rock Albums (Billboard)	17
US Indie Store Album Sales (Billboard)	7
