= Will Evankovich =

American musician and producer

- Born: William Eric Evankovich; April 6, 1972 (age 54); Santa Rosa, California, U.S.
- Genres: Rock
- Occupations: Singer, songwriter, producer
- Instruments: Vocals, guitar
- Years active: 1990–present
- Website: willevankovich.com

William Eric Evankovich (born April 6, 1972) is an American singer/songwriter, guitarist and producer, best known for his performances with Styx, The Guess Who, and rock duo Shaw Blades (with Tommy Shaw from Styx and Jack Blades from Night Ranger), his co-production of Shaw's 2011 debut bluegrass album, The Great Divide, and for producing and co-writing Styx's sixteenth studio album, The Mission, and seventeenth studio album, Crash of the Crown. Evankovic played with TGW beginning in 2014, continuing to produce Styx material with Shaw, and eventually was asked to join Styx, touring as a seventh member in 2021. He produced and played on the 2018 The Guess Who album, The Future Is What It Used To Be, with Derek Sharp, when they were both in TGW.

== Career ==
Evankovich is a songwriter, producer and performer. He has performed with artists including Tommy Shaw of Styx, Jack Blades of Night Ranger, Styx, Night Ranger, Shaw Blades, Don Felder, Robin Zander, Dwight Yoakam, Johnny Lee, Mac Powell of Third Day, Bun E Carlos, Vince Neil, Ted Nugent, Jeff Carlisi of 38 Special and Tommy Thayer of Kiss. He started Mason Lane, Stereo Flyers, and was a co-founder, lead vocalist and guitar player for the American rock band The American Drag.

In 2004 he formed The American Drag with guitarist Monroe Grisman, and bassist Joe Shaughnessy and they released their debut album American Drag in 2005.

From 2007 to 2009, he toured with Jack Blades and Tommy Shaw in their Shaw Blades project. He was asked by Jack Blades, who had seen American Drag perform and wanted Evankovich to join them on acoustic, 12-string, harmonica and background vocals.

In 2009, The American Drag released their second album, Out of the Sky, with drummer John Mader and Eric Levy (Garaj Mahal). Jack Blades provided the circa World War I aviation photos taken by Blades's grandfather for the CD cover. The American Drag was invited to open two shows for Styx, one at the House of Blues in Los Angeles and another at the Mountain Winery in Saratoga.

In 2009, Evankovich made his musical theater debut as a guitar player in the opening of the stage musical American Idiot at the Berkeley Repertory Theatre, a show which would move to Broadway in 2010. The show was the top grossing show in Berkeley Rep history.

In 2014, Evankovich joined the band the Guess Who on lead guitar and toured with them until 2021.

In 2017, Evankovich produced and co-wrote the Styx album The Mission.

In 2021, Evankovich produced and co-wrote the Styx album Crash of the Crown and was officially announced as the seventh member of Styx by Tommy Shaw.

In 2025, Evankovich produced and co-wrote the Styx album Circling from Above.

== Discography ==
| Year | Credit | Song | Album | Artist |
|---|---|---|---|---|
| 2025 | Acoustic guitar, electric guitar, mandolin, harmonica, synthesizers, soundscapes, vocals, production, engineering (all tracks), string arrangements (tracks 6, 8, 9, 11) | Full album | Circling From Above | Styx |
| 2021 | Co-writer, production, mixing, engineering, additional personnel | Full album | Crash of the Crown | Styx |
| 2018 | Guitar, production, songwriter | Full album | The Future IS What It Used to Be | The Guess Who |
| 2017 | Producer, co-writer, performer | Full album | The Mission | Styx |
| 2011 | Vocal production | Full album | Regeneration Volume II | Styx |
| 2011 | Writer, engineer, pre-production | Full album | Somewhere in California | Night Ranger |
| 2011 | Guitar | "The Great Divide" | The Great Divide | Tommy Shaw |
| 2011 | Background vocals | "Umpteen Miles" | The Great Divide | Tommy Shaw |
| 2011 | Guitar | "I'll Be Comin' Home" | The Great Divide | Tommy Shaw |
| 2011 | Co-producer, engineer | Full album | The Great Divide | Tommy Shaw |
| 2010 | Acoustic guitar | "Who'll Stop the Rain" | Tattoos & Tequila | Vince Neil |
| 2010 | Vocal production | Full album | Regeneration Volume I | Styx |
| 2009 | Lead vocals, guitar, producer | Full album | Out of the Sky | The American Drag |
| 2007 | Background vocals | Full album | Love Grenade | Ted Nugent |
| 2005 | Lead vocals, guitar, producer | Full album | American Drag | The American Drag |
