= 7 Deadly Zens =

Studio album by Tommy Shaw
- Released: June 30, 1998
- Genre: Rock
- Length: 60:06
- Label: CMC International
- Producer: Tommy Shaw; Eddie Ashworth

Tommy Shaw chronology
Ambition (1987)	7 Deadly Zens (1998)	The Great Divide (2011)

Professional ratings
Review scores
Source	Rating
Allmusic	4/5 stars

7 Deadly Zens is a solo studio album by Styx guitarist/vocalist Tommy Shaw. It was released in 1998 by CMC International Records. The album is in a hard rock style.

== Track listing ==
All tracks are written by Tommy Shaw, except where noted.

No.	Title	Writer(s)	Length
1.	"Ocean"		3:33
2.	"Stop Knockin'"	Tommy Shaw, Gerry Goffin, Barry Goldberg	5:17
3.	"All in How You Say It"	Tommy Shaw, Gerry Goffin	4:47
4.	"What Do You Want From Life"		4:37
5.	"In This Night"		3:55
6.	"Half a Mind"		3:58
7.	"Straight Down the Line"	Tommy Shaw, Jack Blades	5:01
8.	"Diamond"		4:24
9.	"Inspiration (Mona Lisa)"		5:55
10.	"Who I Am (Need Water)"		7:08
11.	"Down on the Ground"		5:53
12.	"A Place to Call My Own"		5:40
13.	"Peace, Love (Weird)"		2:17
14.	"How Should I Feel" (Japanese Bonus Track)"		4:55

== Personnel ==
- Tommy Shaw – vocals, all guitars, baritone guitars, mandolins
- C.J. Vanston – Wurlitzer electric piano (2, 3, 8, 10), Fender Rhodes (2, 3, 8, 10), Hammond B3 organ (2, 3, 8, 10)
- Ted Nugent – lead guitar (1, 12), spoken word
- Kirk Helle – extremely noisy guitars and things (1–3, 7, 10, 11), string arrangements
- Jack Blades – bass guitar
- John Pierce – bass guitar
- Marco Mendoza – bass guitar
- Todd Sucherman – drums
- Michael Cartellone – additional drums
- Umfante – all percussion, all backing vocals (1–9, 10–12), spoken word
- Asfoon Kia – castanets (11)
- The 7 Deadly Zens Quartet: David Lowe, Jerry Goodman, Vivian, Oscar – strings
- Jerry Goodman – terrifying violin solo (2)
- Murmuring Tommyncale Choir – choral group
- Ed Roland – middle eight vocal (1)
- Alison Krauss – vocals (6)
- Kevin Cronin – vocals (7)
- Julia Tillman Waters – backing vocals (10)
- Maxine Waters Willard – backing vocals (10)
- Oren Waters – backing vocals (10)
- Angie Dickinson – spoken word
- Marina Sirtis – spoken word

=== Production ===
- Tommy Shaw – producer
- Eddie Ashworth – producer, engineer
- Keith Marks – mixing, assistant engineer, additional engineer (guitar solos and keyboards)
- Loren Drane – art direction
- Mark Weiss – photography
- Charlie Brusco – management

== Enhanced CD ==
Enhanced CD features include:

- QuickTime videos on the making of the album, with studio footage and clips with Kevin Cronin, Alison Krauss and Ted Nugent
- photos
- song lyrics
- web links
