= The Mission (Styx album) =

Studio album by Styx
- Released: June 16, 2017
- Recorded: 2015–2017
- Studios: Blackbird Studio, The Shop, 6 Studio Amontillado, Nashville, Tennessee
- Genre: Progressive rock
- Length: 42:00
- Label: UM^{e}
- Producer: Will Evankovich

Styx chronology
Big Bang Theory (2005)	The Mission (2017)	Crash of the Crown (2021)

Professional ratings
Review scores
Source	Rating
AllMusic	4/5 stars
TeamRock	4.5/5 stars

The Mission is the sixteenth studio album by American rock band Styx, released on June 16, 2017, through UM^{e}. It is the band's first studio album since 2005's Big Bang Theory and their first release of original material since 2003's Cyclorama. The album reached #45 on the Billboard 200, propelled by pre-sales prior to its official release date, but fell off the chart after 2 weeks. U.S. Sales were approximately 15,000 copies, the album did briefly reach the Top 100 in four countries. The concept album tells the story of a mission to the planet Mars in the year 2033. The album's story was written by Tommy Shaw and Will Evankovich. Evankovich played a significant role, serving as producer and co-writing all but one of the full length tracks.

== Background ==
The album was conceived in 2015 when Tommy Shaw composed the guitar riff that became the record's closing track, "Mission to Mars". The first lines Shaw wrote were "Now we can say it / This is the day / We'll be on our way / On our mission to Mars". The story was then formed around this idea.

== Promotion ==
Styx announced the album in conjunction with the release of the lead single "Gone Gone Gone", while "Radio Silence" and "Hundred Million Miles from Home" were later made available prior to the album's release. The LP was expanded in 2018 and re-released in 5.1 surround sound (both DTS Master Audio and Dolby TrueHD) on a Blu-ray disc with visualizations for each song as well as a various music videos from the album and a "Making of the Mission" documentary.

== Reception ==
The album was well received by AllMusic's Stephen Erlewine, awarding the release four out of five stars and considered it a return to form for the band. In his qualitative review, he emphasised the strength of the material harkening back to the band's late 70s material and Paradise Theatre album, despite not having Dennis DeYoung as the band's frontman.

== Track listing ==
No.	Title	Writer(s)	Lead vocals	Length
1.	"Overture"	Tommy Shaw	Instrumental	1:23
2.	"Gone Gone Gone"	Shaw; Will Evankovich; James "JY" Young	Gowan	2:07
3.	"Hundred Million Miles from Home"	Shaw; Evankovich	Shaw	3:39
4.	"Trouble at the Big Show"	Shaw; Evankovich; Young	Shaw; Young	2:30
5.	"Locomotive"	Shaw; Evankovich	Shaw	5:03
6.	"Radio Silence"	Shaw; Evankovich; Lawrence Gowan	Shaw	4:17
7.	"The Greater Good"	Shaw; Evankovich; Gowan	Shaw; Gowan	4:10
8.	"Time May Bend"	Shaw; Evankovich	Gowan	2:30
9.	"Ten Thousand Ways"	Shaw; Gowan; Young	Shaw; Gowan; Young	1:22
10.	"Red Storm"	Shaw; Evankovich	Shaw	6:04
11.	"All Systems Stable"	Shaw; Evankovich; Gowan; Todd Sucherman	Shaw	0:17
12.	"Khedive"	Shaw; Gowan	Shaw; Gowan; Young	2:04
13.	"The Outpost"	Shaw; Evankovich; Gowan	Gowan	3:51
14.	"Mission to Mars"	Shaw	Shaw	2:43
Total length:				42:00

== Personnel ==
Styx

- Lawrence Gowan – vocals, piano, Hammond B-3 organ, synthesizers
- Tommy Shaw – vocals, acoustic & electric guitars, mandolin
- James "JY" Young – vocals, electric guitars
- Ricky Phillips – bass guitar
- Chuck Panozzo – bass guitar on "Hundred Million Miles from Home"
- Todd Sucherman – drums, percussion, waterphone

Additional personnel

- Will Evankovich – additional synthesizers, guitars, sound effects

Production

- Will Evankovich – production, engineering
- Alan Hertz – engineering
- Sean Badum – engineering
- JR Taylor – additional engineering
- Jim Scott – mixing
- Kevin Dean – assistant mixing engineer
- Derek Sharp – additional editing
- Richard Dudd – mastering
- Todd Gallopo – cover illustration, art direction & design
- Jason Powell – band photography

== Charts ==
Chart (2017)	Peak position
Canadian Albums (Billboard)	56
German Albums (Offizielle Top 100)	49
Scottish Albums (Official Charts)	98
Swiss Albums (Schweizer Hitparade)	34
UK Rock & Metal Albums (Official Charts)	10
US Billboard 200	45
US Top Rock Albums (Billboard)	9
US Indie Store Album Sales (Billboard)	22
