= The Great Divide (Tommy Shaw album) =

Studio album by Tommy Shaw
- Released: March 22, 2011
- Genre: Bluegrass
- Length: 33:26
- Label: Pazzo Music
- Producer: Tommy Shaw; Brad Davis; Will Evankovich

Tommy Shaw chronology
7 Deadly Zens (1998)	The Great Divide (2011)

The Great Divide is the Bluegrass debut solo album by Styx guitarist/vocalist Tommy Shaw, released on March 22, 2011.

== Track listing ==
1. "The Next Right Thing" (Shaw) – 3:05
2. "Back In Your Kitchen" (Shaw, Gary Burr) – 3:02
3. "Sawmill" (Shaw) – 2:27
4. "The Great Divide" (Shaw, Paula Breedlove) – 3:16
5. "Shadows in the Moonlight" (Shaw, Gary Burr) – 3:10
6. "Get On The One" (Shaw) – 2:09
7. "Umpteen Miles" (Shaw, Brad Davis) – 3:17
8. "Cavalry" (Shaw, Gary Burr) – 2:34
9. "Afraid To Love" (Shaw, Brad Davis) – 2:59
10. "Give 'em Hell Harry" (Shaw) – 4:36
11. "I'll Be Coming Home" (Shaw, Brad Davis) – 2:56

== Personnel ==
- Tommy Shaw – lead vocals, resonator guitar (1, 5, 9, 11), dobro (2, 3), guitars (4, 6–8, 10)
- Brad Davis – guitars (1–9)
- Sam Bush – mandolin (1–9)
- Scott Vestal – banjo (1, 2, 6)
- Greg Davis – banjo (3)
- Rob Ickes – dobro (1, 5, 6, 8)
- Jerry Douglas – dobro (4, 9)
- Byron House – bass (1–9)
- Chris Brown – drums (1–3, 5, 6, 8)
- Stuart Duncan – fiddle (1, 3, 5, 7–11)
- Dwight Yoakam – backing vocals (1)
- Will Evankovich – backing vocals (2, 7), guitars (4, 11)
- Alison Krauss – backing vocals (4, 9)

== Production ==
- Tommy Shaw – producer
- Brad Davis – producer
- Will Evankovich – producer, vocal producer, engineer, mixing, editing
- Matt Andrews – engineer
- Alan Hertz – mixing
- Gordon Hammond – additional engineer
- John Golden – mastering at John Golden Mastering (Ventura, California)
- Sterling Bacon – design, layout
- Myriam Santos-Kayda – photography
- Charlie Brusco – management

== Chart performance ==
Chart (2011)	Peak position
U.S. Billboard Top Bluegrass Albums	2
