= Circling from Above =

Studio album by Styx
- Released: July 18, 2025
- Studio: Blackbird Recording Studios (Nashville, TN); In The Pocket Studio (Forestville, CA); The Shop (Acata,CA); Lone Buffalo Song Labs
- Genre: Progressive rock; hard rock
- Length: 41:13
- Label: Universal Music Enterprises
- Producer: Will Evankovich

Styx chronology
| Crash of the Crown (2021) | Circling from Above (2025) |

Singles from Circling from Above
- 1. "Build and Destroy" Released: May 28, 2025; 2. "Forgive" Released: August 8, 2025

Circling from Above is the eighteenth studio album by American rock band Styx. The album was released on July 18, 2025, by Universal Music Enterprises. This is the first album to feature Will Evankovich and Terry Gowan as full-time members.

It was ranked by Goldmine as one of the 11 top prog albums of 2025.

== Background ==
On March 20, 2024, Styx announced via social media that Ricky Phillips would be leaving the band to spend more time at home and away from the road. On March 22, 2024, Lawrence Gowan's younger brother Terry debuted as the new touring bass player for Styx at their show in Wallingford, Connecticut. On May 17 he was announced as an official member.

On May 28, 2025, Styx announced their eighteenth studio album, Circling from Above, set for release on July 18 via Alpha Dog 2T/UMe. Produced by Will Evankovich, the 13-track album explores themes of human ambition, technology, and nature, and features contributions from all seven current members of the band. The lead single, "Build and Destroy," was released alongside an AI-generated music video, and physical copies of the album will be made available ahead of the digital release during the band's 2025 Brotherhood of Rock tour.

== Track listing ==
Circling from Above track listing
| No. | Title | Writer(s) | Length |
|---|---|---|---|
| 1. | "Circling from Above" | Tommy Shaw; Will Evankovich | 2:00 |
| 2. | "Build and Destroy" | Shaw; Evankovich; Lawrence Gowan | 3:53 |
| 3. | "Michigan" | Shaw; Evankovich | 3:03 |
| 4. | "King of Love" | Shaw; Evankovich; Gowan | 3:29 |
| 5. | "It’s Clear" | Shaw; Evankovich; Gowan | 3:31 |
| 6. | "Forgive" | Evankovich; Gowan | 3:55 |
| 7. | "Everybody Raise a Glass" | Shaw; Evankovich; Gowan | 3:35 |
| 8. | "Blue Eyed Raven" | Shaw | 3:54 |
| 9. | "She Knows" | Evankovich | 3:35 |
| 10. | "Ease Your Mind" | Evankovich; Gowan | 0:48 |
| 11. | "The Things That You Said" | Shaw; Evankovich | 3:28 |
| 12. | "We Lost the Wheel Again" | Evankovich | 2:57 |
| 13. | "Only You Can Decide" | Shaw | 3:05 |
| Total length: | | | 41:13 |

== Personnel ==
Credits adapted from the album's liner notes.

=== Styx ===
- Tommy Shaw – acoustic guitar, electric guitar, mandolin, vocals
- James Young – electric guitar, vocals
- Chuck Panozzo – bass guitar
- Todd Sucherman – drums, percussion
- Lawrence Gowan – piano, B3 organ, synthesizers, Mellotron, harmonium, vocals
- Will Evankovich – acoustic guitar, electric guitar, mandolin, harmonica, synthesizers, soundscapes, vocals, production, engineering (all tracks); string arrangements (tracks 6, 8, 9, 11)
- Terry Gowan – bass guitar, upright bass

=== Guest musicians ===
- Stevie Blacke – strings, string arrangements (6, 8, 9, 11)
- Jeff Coffin – clarinet solo (9)
- Aubrey Haynie – fiddle solo (8)

=== Technical personnel ===
- Alan Hertz – mixing, engineering
- Scott Rottler – engineering
- Austin Brown – engineering
- Channing Watkins – mixing assistance
- Ted Jensen – mastering
- Mark Petrocelli – drum technician
- Josh Graham – art direction, design, imagery
- Caitlin Layne – band photography, video
- Jason Powell – band photography, video

== Charts ==
Chart performance for Circling from Above
| Chart (2025) | Peak position |
|---|---|
| Austrian Albums (Ö3 Austria) | 73 |
| German Albums (Offizielle Top 100) | 46 |
| Swiss Albums (Schweizer Hitparade) | 20 |
| US Top Current Album Sales (Billboard) | 32 |
