= Strange Animal =

Studio album by Gowan
- Released: February 1985
- Recorded: 1984
- Studio: Startling Studios; Ascot, Berkshire, England
- Genre: Progressive pop, synth rock
- Length: 41:59
- Label: Columbia (1984-2008); Linus Entertainment (2008-Present)
- Producer: David Tickle

Gowan chronology
Gowan (1982)	Strange Animal (1985)	Great Dirty World (1987)

Singles from Strange Animal
- 1. "A Criminal Mind" Released: 15 January 1985; 2. "(You're a) Strange Animal" Released: May 1985; 3. "Cosmetics"; 4. "Guerilla Soldier"

Return Of The Strange Animal Cover
- Released 2010

Professional ratings
Review scores
Source	Rating
AllMusic	3/5 stars

Strange Animal is the second studio album by Canadian musician Lawrence Gowan, released in 1985. Despite not having an American release, Strange Animal is considered to be Gowan's breakthrough release; the album would go on to reach No. 5 on the Canadian album charts and spawned the singles "(You're a) Strange Animal", "A Criminal Mind", "Cosmetics" and "Guerilla Soldier".

== Production and background ==
After his 1982 debut album Gowan did not fare well, Gowan "found himself naturally gravitating" to the Queen Street West music scene that was developing in Toronto in the mid 1980s. Gowan spent a year writing songs, and also travelled to Scotland and Ireland to trace his heritage.

While there, he received a telephone call from English record producer David Tickle, who said he would produce the album and arranged a recording session. Tickle secured the services of several session musicians from the backing band of Peter Gabriel for the recording session, including bassist Tony Levin, drummer Jerry Marotta, and guitarist David Rhodes. The album Strange Animal was recorded at Startling Studios owned by Ringo Starr.

The opening track, "Cosmetics", was inspired by Gowan's interest in the attractive and artistically sensitive, and the thin line between the deep and the superficial in the fickle world on modeling. Gowan's inspiration for the title track, "(You're A) Strange Animal", came from the writings of Hermann Hesse and an interest pull that various individuals can have on life. "A Criminal Mind", which Gowan has often been asked to explain his inspiration for, was inspired by a character that Gowan imagined in his psyche. According to Gowan, the words in the song are that character's declaration. The title originated from a conversation Gowan had with a retired prison guard. In a 2015 interview with HuffPost, Gowan stated that "Cosmetics" was selected as the first track on the album because Ringo Starr told him he danced to it in his kitchen during Gowan's recording sessions at Starr's home studio.

In September 1985, the album Strange Animal achieved double platinum status and established Gowan as a "hit domestic artist". Despite his domestic success and a secondary United States release in May 1985, the song received little airplay in the United States.

== Legacy ==
In 1999, Lawrence Gowan became a permanent member of the American rock band Styx, replacing original frontman and keyboardist Dennis DeYoung. Gowan being uncomfortable with performing Styx's song "Babe", which DeYoung had originally written for his wife, "A Criminal Mind" was subsequently added to Styx's setlist and for a time became a staple piece at concerts. The song would go on to be included in the live albums Styx World: Live 2001, 21st Century Live and One with Everything: Styx and the Contemporary Youth Orchestra.

In 2018, "A Criminal Mind" was certified as a Platinum Single in Canada, surpassing a combined 80,000 physical 7", 12" single and digital downloaded units sold. Gowan was presented with the plaque on stage at his Caesar's Palace show in Windsor, Ontario.

== Track listing ==
All songs written and composed by Lawrence Gowan.

1. "Cosmetics" – 4:37
2. "Desperate" – 4:20
3. "City of the Angels" – 4:02
4. "Walking on Air" – 4:47
5. "Burning Torches of Hope" – 3:59
6. "Keep the Tension On" – 3:43
7. "Guerilla Soldier" – 4:32
8. "(You're A) Strange Animal" – 4:37
9. "A Criminal Mind" – 7:22

=== Return of the Strange Animal re-release ===
In 2008, Lawrence Gowan's Columbia recordings reverted to him and were subsequently assigned to Linus Entertainment. In 2010, Gowan and Linus repackaged the album as Return of the Strange Animal featuring a remastered version of the album's songs combined with a DVD documentary feature and three music videos. In May 2010, Gowan performed two solo shows in support of the 25th anniversary of the Strange Animal album.

== Personnel ==
- Lawrence Gowan – lead vocals and backing vocals, piano and synthesizers
- Chris Jarrett – guitars
- David Rhodes – guitars
- Tony Levin – basses and Chapman Stick
- Jerry Marotta - drums and backing vocals

== Singles ==
Name	Chart (1985)	Peak position
"A Criminal Mind"	Canada	5
"(You're a) Strange Animal"	Canada	15
"Cosmetics"	Canada	41
"Guerilla Soldier"	Canada	40

== Awards and nominations ==
Juno Awards

Year	Winner	Category
1985	A Criminal Mind	Best Video
1985	Strange Animal	Best Album Graphics

Year	Nominated	Category
1985	"Strange Animal"	Male Vocalist of the Year
1985	Strange Animal	Album of the Year
1985	"A Criminal Mind"	Best Selling Single
1985	"(You're a) Strange Animal" Animation by Greg Duffell / Lightbox Studios Inc.	Best Video
1986	"Cosmetics" (director: Rob Quartly)	Best Video
