= Girls with Guns (album) =

Studio album by Tommy Shaw
- Released: October 1984
- Recorded: 1984
- Studio: Chicago Recording Company (Chicago, Illinois); The Town House (London, UK)
- Genre: Pop rock
- Length: 48:53
- Label: A&M
- Producer: Mike Stone

Tommy Shaw chronology
Girls with Guns (1984)	What If? (1985)

Singles from Girls with Guns
- 1. "Girls with Guns" Released: September 1984; 2. "Lonely School" Released: December 1984; 3. "Free to Love You" Released: March 1985

Professional ratings
Review scores
Source	Rating
AllMusic	3/5 stars

Girls with Guns is the debut solo album from Styx guitarist/vocalist Tommy Shaw. It was released in October 1984 by A&M Records.

The title track was a top 10 hit on rock radio, peaking at No. 6 on the Billboard Mainstream Rock Tracks chart and reaching a high of No. 33 on the Billboard Hot 100. "Girls with Guns" was featured in the first season of the Miami Vice episode "Glades".

A second single, the ballad "Lonely School", was released in late 1984 and peaked at No. 60 on the Hot 100 in January 1985. The videos for both singles received premiere status and strong rotation on MTV, and the network aired a concert special featuring Shaw.

The CD and cassette formats of the album feature extended versions of the ballad "Kiss Me Hello" and the dance-rock track "Outside in the Rain".

The Girls with Guns album charted on the Billboard 200 chart for 25 weeks, peaking at No. 50.

== Track listing ==
All words & music by Tommy Shaw except as noted.

1. "Girls with Guns" – 3:11
2. "Come In and Explain" – 4:20
3. "Lonely School" – 5:03
4. "Heads Up" (Tommy Shaw, Eddie Wohlford, Kenny Loggins) – 4:42
5. "Kiss Me Hello" – 5:37 [vinyl]; 7:47 [CD/cassette extended version]
6. "Fading Away" – 4:03
7. "Little Girl World" – 3:32
8. "Outside in the Rain" – 4:32 [vinyl]; 5:59 [CD/cassette extended version]
9. "Free to Love You" (Shaw, Wohlford) – 4:49
10. "The Race Is On" (Shaw, Wohlford) – 5:27

== Personnel ==
- Tommy Shaw – lead vocals, backing vocals, electric guitars, acoustic guitars, 12-string guitar, mandolin
- Peter Wood – acoustic piano, electric piano, synthesizer
- Russ Powell - guitar
- Brian Stanley – bass guitar
- Steve Holley – drums, percussion
- Richie Cannata – saxophone solo (10)
- Molly Duncan – saxophone section (10)
- Kevin Townend – string arrangements
- Carol Kenyon – lead and backing vocals (8)
- Jimbo Jones – backing vocals (8)
- Eddie Wohlford – backing vocals (8)

Drummer Steve Holley had played in Paul McCartney's band, Wings. He and bassist Brian Stanley would go on to become the rhythm section of Jules Shear's 1988 band project, Reckless Sleepers. Keyboard player Peter Wood played with Al Stewart and also served as the surrogate version of Rick Wright in the 1980 and 1981 performances of Pink Floyd's The Wall. Richie Cannata was a main stay in Billy Joel's backing band.

=== Production ===
- Mike Stone – producer, recording, mixing
- Tom Hanson – second engineer
- Ben Kape – second engineer
- Bob Ludwig – mastering at Masterdisk (New York, NY)
- Richard Frankel – art direction, design
- Norman Moore – art direction
- Tracy Veal – design
- Larry Williams – cover photography, inner sleeve photography
- Paul Cox – inner sleeve photography
