= Great Dirty World =

Studio album by Gowan
- Released: March 23, 1987
- Recorded: 1986–1987
- Studio: Producers Studios, Los Angeles, California
- Genre: Pop, soft rock
- Length: 41:39
- Label: Columbia
- Producer: David Tickle

Gowan chronology
| Strange Animal (1985) | Great Dirty World (1987) | Lost Brotherhood (1990) |

Singles from Great Dirty World
- 1. "Moonlight Desires" Released: March 1987; 2. "Awake The Giant" Released: June 1987; 3. "Living in the Golden Age" Released: 1987

2012 remastered cover

Professional ratings
Review scores
| Source | Rating |
|---|---|
| Allmusic | 3/5 stars |

Great Dirty World is the third studio album by Canadian musician Lawrence Gowan, originally released in 1987. The album reached multi-platinum status in Canada and spawned the singles, "Moonlight Desires," "Awake the Giant," and "Living in the Golden Age". Jon Anderson of Yes contributed backing vocals to "Moonlight Desires". The album went on to reach #4 in the Canadian charts, surpassing Strange Animal, Gowan's previous album. The album was remastered in 2012, which added new artwork and three re-recorded bonus tracks which were originally from this album.

== Track listings ==
All songs written and composed by Lawrence Gowan.

1. "Moonlight Desires" – 4:13
2. "Awake the Giant" – 4:04
3. "Living in the Golden Age" – 5:31
4. "Dedication" – 4:51
5. "Human Drama" – 4:46
6. "Forever One" – 4:14
7. "One Brief Shining Moment" – 4:42
8. "60 Second Nightmare" – 4:27
9. "Great Dirty World" – 4:51

=== Bonus Tracks – 2012 remastered edition ===
1. Forever One (Piano Version)
2. One Brief Shining Moment (Piano Version)
3. Great Dirty World (Piano Version)

==== Personnel ====
- Lawrence Gowan – vocals, piano, keyboards
- J. Peter Robinson – keyboards, B3 organ, bass synth, string synth
- Gene Black – guitar
- Tony Levin – bass guitar
- Will Lee – bass guitar
- Terry Gowan – Chapman stick
- Rob Brill – drums, percussion
- Nigel Olsson – drums
- Brandon Fields – saxophone
- Deborah Silver – background vocals
- Kaz Silver-Lee – background vocals
- Jon Anderson – special guest vocalist on "Moonlight Desires"
- The San Fernando Valley Men's Choir and Choral Singers – choir (arranged and conducted by Bob Ezrin)

== Singles ==
| Name | Chart (1985) | Peakposition |
|---|---|---|
| "Moonlight Desires" | Canada | 10 |
| "Awake the Giant" | Canada | 36 |
| "Living in the Golden Age" | Canada | 78 |
