= Damn Yankees (album) =

Studio album by Damn Yankees
- Released: March 13, 1990
- Recorded: 1989–90
- Studios: A&M, Hollywood, California; Can-Am, Tarzana, California
- Genres: Hard rock; glam metal
- Length: 45:46
- Label: Warner Bros.
- Producer: Ron Nevison

Damn Yankees chronology
Damn Yankees (1990)	Don't Tread (1992)

Singles from Damn Yankees
- 1. "Coming of Age" Released: March 1990; 2. "High Enough" Released: September 22, 1990; 3. "Come Again" Released: December 1990; 4. "Runaway" Released: 1991; 5. "Bad Reputation" Released: 1991

Professional ratings
Review scores
Source	Rating
AllMusic	4/5 stars
Classic Rock	3.5/5 stars
Collector's Guide to Heavy Metal	3/10
The Rolling Stone Album Guide	2/5 stars

Damn Yankees is the self-titled debut album by the American hard rock supergroup Damn Yankees, released by Warner Bros. Records on March 13, 1990. It was certified double platinum in the US and features hits such as "High Enough", "Come Again", and "Coming of Age".

== Music ==
The first single, "Coming of Age", a traditional guitar-driven song, gained heavy airplay on rock radio, reaching No. 60 on the US Billboard Hot 100 chart.

The song "Piledriver" is based on the song "Crazy Ladies" by Ted Nugent, from the album Little Miss Dangerous.

== Track listing ==
All tracks are written by Jack Blades, Ted Nugent, and Tommy Shaw.

No.	Title	Length
1.	"Coming of Age"	4:21
2.	"Bad Reputation"	4:29
3.	"Runaway"	4:02
4.	"High Enough"	4:43
5.	"Damn Yankees"	4:37
6.	"Come Again"	5:38
7.	"Mystified"	4:14
8.	"Rock City"	4:28
9.	"Tell Me How You Want It"	4:32
10.	"Piledriver"	4:18
Total length:		45:46

== Personnel ==
=== Band members ===
- Tommy Shaw – guitar, vocals
- Ted Nugent – guitar, vocals
- Jack Blades – bass guitar, vocals
- Michael Cartellone – drums

=== Additional musicians ===
- Alan Pasqua – Hammond organ
- Neverleave Brothers – backing vocals
- Jimmie Haskell – string arrangements, conductor

=== Production ===
- Ron Nevison – producer, engineer
- Pre–production at Soundscape Studios, New York, Prairie Sun Recording Studios, Cotati and Blades Ranch, Sonoma County, California
- Tucker Williamson, Franck Derner – assistance at Blades Ranch
- John Aguto, Ed Goodreau, Bill Kennedy – assistant engineers at A&M Studios
- Toby Wright, Jeff Poe – assistant engineers at Can-Am Recorders
- John Kalodner – A&R

== Charts ==
Chart (1990–91)	Peak position
Canada Top Albums/CDs (RPM)	42
US Billboard 200	13

== Certifications ==
Region	Certification	Certified units/sales
Canada (Music Canada)	Gold	50,000^{^}
United States (RIAA)	2× Platinum	2,000,000^{^}
^{^} Shipments figures based on certification alone.
