= ...But You Can Call Me Larry =

Studio album by Lawrence Gowan
- Released: 1993
- Genres: Rock, adult contemporary
- Label: Anthem
- Producers: Jerry Marotta, Eddie Schwartz

Lawrence Gowan chronology
Lost Brotherhood (1990)	...But You Can Call Me Larry (1993)	The Good Catches Up (1995)

...But You Can Call Me Larry is the fifth studio album by the Canadian musician Lawrence Gowan, released in 1993. The album's first single was "When There's Time (For Love)"; three more singles were released. The album went gold in Canada. Gowan is credited by his full name on the album cover.

== Production ==
The album was produced by Jerry Marotta and Eddie Schwartz. Robert Fripp played guitar on the album; Tony Levin played bass. Jann Arden contributed vocals. John Sebastian appeared on "Last Laugh". Gowan made a decision to move away from keyboards and synthesizers after buying a Martin acoustic guitar. He felt that playing guitar instead of piano introduced new aspects to his songwriting.

== Critical reception ==
Professional ratings
Review scores
Source	Rating
AllMusic	3/5 stars
Calgary Herald	B−
MusicHound Rock: The Essential Album Guide	4/5 stars

The Toronto Star called the songs "refreshingly honest and heartfelt, with nary a hint of bandwagon jumping." The Vancouver Sun determined that "producer/drummer Jerry Marotta does indeed stay out of the way of the songs, and a crack band—including former Red Rider guitar ace Kenny Greer—provide subtle accompaniment."

The Ottawa Citizen thought that "Gowan's voice sounds better and shows more versatility, landing somewhere between Rod Stewart and Chris de Burgh in the unhurried romantic ballad 'When There's Time (For Love)'."

AllMusic called the album "Gowan's wholehearted attempt at capturing a mature audience through acoustically based ballads and adult contemporary-styled rock songs."

== Track listing ==
No.	Title	Length
1.	"Soul's Road"
2.	"When There's Time (For Love)"
3.	"Innocent"
4.	"Your Stone Walls"
5.	"Dancing on My Own Ground"
6.	"Cry on My Shoulder"
7.	"Moonchild's Psychedelic Holiday"
8.	"You Never Let Go"
9.	"(In The) Wild Summer Night"
10.	"Last Laugh"
11.	"Little Face"
