= Damn Yankees (band) =

American rock band

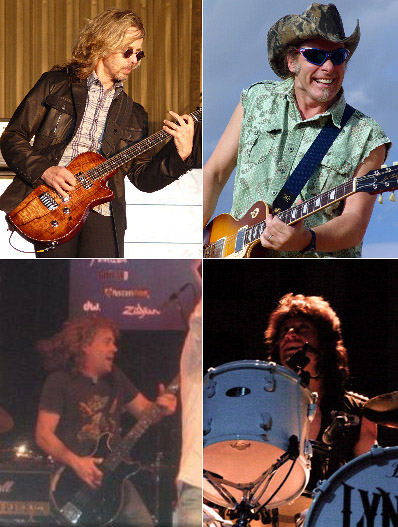
- Clockwise from upper left: Tommy Shaw, Ted Nugent, Michael Cartellone, Jack Blades

Background information
- Origin: New York City, U.S.
- Genres: Hard rock; arena rock; glam metal
- Years active: 1989–1994; 1998–2001; 2004; 2010
- Label: Warner Bros.
- Past members: Tommy Shaw; Jack Blades; Ted Nugent; Michael Cartellone

Damn Yankees were an American rock supergroup formed in New York City, in 1989. Consisting of singer/guitarist Tommy Shaw of Styx, singer/bassist Jack Blades of Night Ranger, guitarist Ted Nugent of the Amboy Dukes, and drummer Michael Cartellone (who would later join Lynyrd Skynyrd).

They are remembered for the songs "High Enough" and "Where You Goin' Now", both Top 40 hits in the early 1990s.

== History ==
In the late 1980s, the US rock music scene witnessed a trend for supergroups; Bad English, Mr. Big and Badlands were all formed around that time. Shaw, Blades and Nugent were put together by producer John Kalodner as Damn Yankees in 1989 in response to declining commercial success of their original bands. Produced by rock producer Ron Nevison, the newly formed band's self-titled debut album was released in 1990 and went double-platinum in 1994. Jack Blades's leading single "Coming of Age" hit No. 60 on the U.S. Hot 100 and No. 1 on the AOR charts, while Shaw-penned "Come Again" received extensive AOR airplay.

The power ballad "High Enough" became their best selling single, rising to No. 3 on U.S. Billboard Hot 100 and No. 2 on AOR charts at the beginning of 1991. "High Enough" was Ted Nugent's first mainstream top ten single. The band's songs appeared on several Hollywood film soundtracks, such as Gremlins 2: The New Batch, Nothing But Trouble and The Taking of Beverly Hills.

After the release of their debut, Damn Yankees went on an 18-month world tour with a revamped Bad Company, Poison and Jackyl. Their US tour coincided with the Persian Gulf War, in which the band unfurled American flags and made patriotic statements.

In 1992, Damn Yankees went gold with their follow-up album Don't Tread. The title song, sung by Blades, was included on the album Barcelona Gold, released in coordination with the Barcelona Olympic Games. Nugent also appeared on Rock the Vote, voicing support for the GOP against Bill Clinton. Although the second release was not as successful as the first album, it spawned several popular singles, such as "Mister Please," "Where You Goin' Now" and "The Silence Is Broken," a power ballad featured in the 1993 Jean-Claude Van Damme film Nowhere to Run.

=== Shaw Blades ===
By 1994, there had been a changing of the guard at Warners. Jack Blades explained:

The new regime came in, and they didn't want to do anything with that style of music. And in fact, they paid Damn Yankees a million dollars not to do another Damn Yankees record. We're like, 'Really? OK, we'll just take the check. Why not?' That was how it was because Damn Yankees had sold so many records and we were so recouped, so in our contract the next thing was like 'We get a million bucks to do an album,' and they just paid us the million dollars NOT to do the record. That's how much nobody wanted anything to do with that era and style of music.

Subsequently, Nugent revived his solo career, leaving Tommy Shaw and Jack Blades to record their own album as the duo Shaw Blades. Released in March 1995, Hallucination received very little support from its label as the personnel change brought in industry executives more sympathetic to alternative and grunge bands. Ultimately, the Shaw Blades album came out to some critical praise, but it vanished without major single support or a national tour (which had been cancelled by Warner Bros.). "I'll Always Be with You" did garner some AOR airplay and the title track was heard in the hit movie Tommy Boy, but after a brief West Coast tour, both Shaw and Blades went back to their respective original bands, Styx and Night Ranger.

In 2007, Shaw Blades released their album Influence, which consisted solely of cover songs that influenced them, mostly from the 1960s and 1970s. The pair also recorded a cover of the classic Christmas song "The Twelve Days of Christmas" on the "A Classic Rock Christmas" album by various Classic Rock artists in 2002. Both members still principally record and perform with their respective original bands.

== Reunions ==
During a hiatus in both Night Ranger and Styx, Shaw and Blades met with Ted Nugent to record a new Damn Yankees album in 1999. However, the album, provisionally titled Bravo, failed to please either the band members or the prospective record labels. According to Blades, some of this unused material has since surfaced on various group and solo albums of the band members:

That will never come out. It will always be the long lost record. Little pieces of that have dripped out on my solo record. Tommy had a song on Styx's Cyclorama record. Ted's done two or three of them. It's been hard to figure out, like, 'Oh yeah! That was one of our songs.' It's pretty wild. That record will never see the light of day, but the ones that came out are the best of it.

While on the VH1 Classic show Power Ballads of 88, Jack Blades commented about recent rumors regarding Damn Yankees. Jack said he, Ted, and Tommy had been talking and hanging out. Jack then said there would be new music and a tour from Damn Yankees in the future.

In 2004 at Alice Cooper's Christmas Pudding, an annual charity concert to benefit Alice Cooper's Solid Rock Foundation and Teen Center in Phoenix, AZ, Damn Yankees reunited on stage. The band played "Don't Tread", "High Enough" and "Coming of Age".

On January 15, 2010 at the NAMM Show in Anaheim, California, the original members of Damn Yankees made a surprise appearance at the Taylor Guitars exhibit. Jack Blades, Tommy Shaw, Ted Nugent and Michael Cartellone performed an acoustic set on the Taylor Stage, including hits such as "Coming of Age", "High Enough" and the Ted Nugent anthem "Cat Scratch Fever".

In 2011 Nugent joined Jack Blades' band Night Ranger to record an extended version of "Coming of Age" as a B-side for their album "Somewhere in California." In place of his original solo, Nugent plays a version of the guitar solo from "Stranglehold."

In May 2017 Cartellone joined Night Ranger at the Wildflower Festival in Richardson, Texas for a performance of "Coming of Age."

As far as a potential Damn Yankees reunion goes, Cartellone told Cleveland NBC affiliate WKYC that he and other members of the band have continued to meet and write over the years. While a new album has yet to materialize, he says that does not mean the Damn Yankees are finished. They never purposefully disbanded and are keeping a reunion an open door to this day.

== Musical style ==
AllMusic said the band's styles were arena rock and pop metal. Their songs are considered to be friendly for radio appeal. The band's recorded catalog contains sentimental ballads.

Reviewing the 1990 debut album, Classic Rock Review described a "slick, polished, hard rock sound" and wrote that most of the material was composed collaboratively in the studio, with producer Ron Nevison bringing in session musicians so the three vocalists could concentrate on melodies and harmonies. The review singled out Shaw's high harmonies over Blades's lead vocal on "High Enough", which starts and ends with a string ensemble assembled by Nevison, and described Shaw's "Come Again" as a folk ballad reflecting the arena ballads of Styx, contrasted by Nugent's "frenzied guitar riffs". Jay Roberts of Limelight Magazine wrote that on the debut "the more AOR sound prevails" but with "plenty of guitar pyrotechnics" that he credited to Nugent's influence, and called the 1992 follow-up Don't Tread "pure hard rocking melodic rock and roll", noting the "bluesy flourishes" worked into "Double Coyote".

== Band members ==
=== Members ===
- Tommy Shaw – rhythm & lead guitars, lead & backing vocals
- Jack Blades – bass guitar, lead & backing vocals
- Ted Nugent – lead & rhythm guitars, backing & lead vocals
- Michael Cartellone – drums, percussion, backing vocals

=== Session members ===
- Robbie Buchanan – keyboards on Don't Tread (1992 — multiple tracks)

== Discography ==
=== Studio albums ===
Title	Album details	Peak chart positions	Certifications
Title	Album details	US	Certifications
Damn Yankees	Release date: March 13, 1990; Label: Warner Bros.; Formats: LP, CD, CT	13	RIAA: 2× Platinum
Don't Tread	Release date: August 11, 1992; Label: Warner Bros.; Formats: CD, CT	22	RIAA: Gold

=== Live albums ===
- Extended Versions (2008)

=== Compilation albums ===
- The Essentials (2002)
- Rhino Hi-Five: Damn Yankees EP (2005)
- High Enough - Best of: Damn Yankees (2019)

=== Singles ===
Title	Release	Peak chart positions		
Title	Release	US	US Main	AUS
"Coming of Age"	1990	60	1	-
"High Enough"	1990	3	2	57
"Come Again"	1991	50	5	—
"Runaway"	1991	—	9	—
"Bad Reputation"	1991	—	31	—
"Where You Goin' Now"	1992	20	6	—
"Don't Tread on Me"	1992	—	3	—
"Silence Is Broken"	1993	62	20	—
"Mister Please"	1993	—	3	—

=== Soundtrack appearances ===
- "Bonestripper" (from Nothing but Trouble) (1991)

== Videography ==
=== Music videos ===
Title	Release	Director
"High Enough"	1990	Larry Jordan
"Coming of Age"	1990	Ethan Russell
"Come Again"	1991	Ethan Russell
"Don't Tread on Me"	1992	
"Where You Goin' Now"	1992	Larry Jordan
"Silence Is Broken"	1993	Piers Plowden
