= (You're a) Strange Animal =

1985 song by Lawrence Gowan

Single by Lawrence Gowan

from the album Strange Animal
- Released: May 1985
- Studio: Startling Studios (Ascot, Berkshire, England)
- Genre: Progressive rock
- Length: 4:37
- Label: Columbia
- Songwriter: Lawrence Gowan
- Producer: David Tickle

Lawrence Gowan singles chronology
"A Criminal Mind" (1985)	"(You're a) Strange Animal" (1985)	"Guerilla Soldier" (1985)

"(You're a) Strange Animal" is a song by Scottish-born Canadian musician Lawrence Gowan. Released in May 1985 as the second single from his second studio album, Strange Animal, it reached number 15 in Canada.

== Background ==
Gowan's inspiration came from the writings of Hermann Hesse and an interest pull that various individuals can have on life.

== Charts ==
Chart (1985)	Peak position
Canada Top Singles (RPM)	15

== Popular culture ==
The song is featured in the 2022 horror movie Nope. It serves as the theme song to a fictional sitcom titled Gordy's Home, which factors heavily into the plot. It can be heard in the film itself, and was also featured in viral marketing.

A remixed version of the song produced by electronic musician Pogo is currently used as the theme song for the online right-wing talk show Louder with Crowder.
