= Lost Brotherhood =

Studio album by Gowan
- Released: July 17, 1990
- Recorded: 1989
- Studio: Metalworks Studios and McClear Place, Toronto, Ontario
- Genre: Progressive rock, hard rock, Pop rock
- Length: 45:08
- Label: Anthem; Columbia (Canada); Atlantic (outside Canada)
- Producer: Mike Howlett, Eddie Schwartz, Lawrence Gowan

Gowan chronology
Great Dirty World (1987)	Lost Brotherhood (1990)	...But You Can Call Me Larry (1993)

Professional ratings
Review scores
Source	Rating
Allmusic	4/5 stars

Lost Brotherhood is the fourth studio album by Canadian musician Lawrence Gowan, originally released in 1990. The album reached multi-platinum status in Canada and spawned the singles, "All the Lovers in the World," "Lost Brotherhood," and "Out of a Deeper Hunger". Alex Lifeson of Rush, Steve Shelski of Coney Hatch, and Ken Greer of Red Rider contributed guitar work for the album.

== Track listings ==
Side one
No.	Title	Writer(s)	Producer(s)	Length
1.	"All the Lovers in the World"	Lawrence Gowan; Eddie Schwartz	Schwartz; Gowan	4:16
2.	"Lost Brotherhood"	Gowan	Mike Howlett	4:13
3.	"Call it a Mission"	Gowan	Howlett	5:14
4.	"The Dragon"	Gowan; Schwartz	Schwartz; Gowan	5:51
5.	"Love Makes You Believe"	Gowan	Howlett; Schwartz; Gowan	3:37

Side two
No.	Title	Writer(s)	Producer(s)	Length
1.	"Fire it Up"	Gowan	Howlett	3:56
2.	"Out of a Deeper Hunger"	Gowan	Howlett; Schwartz; Gowan	3:44
3.	"Tender Young Hero"	Gowan	Howlett	4:29
4.	"Message from Heaven"	Gowan	Howlett	4:47
5.	"Holding this Rage"	Gowan	Howlett	5:21

== Personnel ==
- Lawrence Gowan – lead and backing vocals, keyboards
- John Webster – additional keyboards
- Alex Lifeson – guitar (except on "All The Lovers In The World")
- Ken Greer – guitar, pedal steel guitar
- Steve Shelski – additional guitars
- Mladon Zarron – additional guitars
- Tony Levin – bass guitar
- Jerry Marotta – drums, backing vocals
- Greg Critchley – drums on "All The Lovers In The World"
- Steve Kendry – additional drums
- Eddie Schwartz – backing vocals
- Terry Gowan – backing vocals
- Gary Kulesha – string arrangements
- Noel Golden – engineer (all tracks); mixing (tracks 5, 7, 8, 9)
- Chris Lord-Alge – mixing (tracks 1, 4)
- Stephen Chase – mixing (tracks 2, 3, 6, 10)

== Singles ==
Name	Chart (1990)	Peak position
"All the Lovers in the World"	Canada	6
"Lost Brotherhood"	Canada	44
"Out of a Deeper Hunger"	Canada	36
