= Don't Tread =

Studio album by Damn Yankees
- Released: August 11, 1992
- Studios: The Record Plant, Los Angeles
- Genres: Hard rock; pop metal
- Length: 53:02
- Labels: Warner Bros. 45025
- Producer: Ron Nevison

Damn Yankees chronology
Damn Yankees (1990)	Don't Tread (1992)

Alternative cover
- Japanese release cover

Singles from Don't Tread
- 1. "Where You Goin' Now" Released: September 1992; 2. "Don't Tread on Me" Released: 1992; 3. "Silence Is Broken" Released: 1993; 4. "Mister Please" Released: 1993

Professional ratings
Review scores
Source	Rating
AllMusic	3/5 stars
Collector's Guide to Heavy Metal	6/10

Don't Tread is the second and final studio album by the American hard rock supergroup Damn Yankees, released by Warner Bros. Records on August 11, 1992. It features their second highest charting single, the power ballad "Where You Goin' Now" which peaked at number 20. The album itself reached number 22 on the Billboard 200 album chart.

== Track listing ==
All tracks are written by Jack Blades, Ted Nugent, and Tommy Shaw.

No.	Title	Length
1.	"Don't Tread on Me"	5:08
2.	"Fifteen Minutes of Fame"	4:50
3.	"Where You Goin' Now"	4:40
4.	"Dirty Dog"	4:53
5.	"Mister Please"	4:19
6.	"Silence Is Broken"	5:03
7.	"Firefly"	4:57
8.	"Someone to Believe"	4:57
9.	"This Side of Hell"	4:00
10.	"Double Coyote"	4:44
11.	"Uprising"	5:31
Total length:		53:02

Japanese release bonus track
No.	Title	Length
12.	"Come Again" (Radio Mix)	4:10
13.	"Bonestripper"	4:33

== Personnel ==
=== Band members ===
- Tommy Shaw – guitar, vocals
- Ted Nugent – guitar, vocals
- Jack Blades – bass, vocals
- Michael Cartellone – drums

=== Additional musicians ===
- Robbie Buchanan – keyboards
- Tower of Power – horn section conducted by Greg Adams
- Paul Buckmaster – string arrangements, conductor

=== Production ===
- Ron Nevison – producer, engineer
- Craig Brock – assistant engineer
- Andy Udoff – overdubs
- Chris Lord-Alge – mixing
- John Jackson – mixing assistant
- Michael Ostin – executive producer

== Charts ==
Chart (1992)	Peak position
Canada Top Albums/CDs (RPM)	62
Swedish Albums (Sverigetopplistan)	37
Swiss Albums (Schweizer Hitparade)	29
US Billboard 200	22

== Certifications ==
Region	Certification	Certified units/sales
United States (RIAA)	Gold	500,000^{^}
^{^} Shipments figures based on certification alone.
