= Shaw Blades =

American music duo

Shaw Blades is an American musical duo/group formed by Tommy Shaw of Styx and Jack Blades of Night Ranger, both of whom played in the supergroup Damn Yankees. It is an informal duo that has produced two albums between other projects, 1995's Hallucination and 2007's Influence. The first two songs on "Hallucination" — "My Hallucination" and "I'll Always Be with You"—received modest airplay. "Influence" consisted solely of 1960s and 1970s cover songs that influenced them. Blades' son Colin, a songwriter himself, contributed backing vocals and arrangements to the album. Shaw Blades also recorded a cover of the classic Christmas song "The Twelve Days of Christmas" on the A Classic Rock Christmas album by various classic rock artists in 2002. Shaw Blades did a short tour of America in Spring 2007 and another in Autumn 2007. Both members still principally record and perform with the acts that made them famous. From 2007 to 2009, they were joined on tour by Will Evankovich on the request of Blades, who had seen Evankovich's band American Drag perform and wanted him to join them on acoustic,12-string, harmonica and background vocals.

== Discography ==
=== Hallucination ===
Hallucination

Studio album by Shaw Blades
- Released: March 14, 1995
- Recorded: August/September, 1994
- Studio: Jack's Barn
- Genre: Rock
- Length: 42:36
- Label: Warner Records
- Producer: Don Gehman; Tommy Shaw; Jack Blades

Shaw Blades chronology
Hallucination (1995)	Influence (2007)

Professional ratings
Review scores
Source	Rating
AllMusic	3/5 stars

All tracks are written by Tommy Shaw and Jack Blades, unless otherwise noted.

No.	Title	Length
1.	"My Hallucination"	4:40
2.	"I'll Always Be With You"	4:09
3.	"Come to Be My Friend"	5:08
4.	"Don't Talk to Me Anymore"	4:27
5.	"I Stumble In"	4:32
6.	"Blue Continental"	2:32
7.	"Down That Highway"	3:59
8.	"How You Gonna Get Used to This"	4:05
9.	"Night Goes On"	2:42
10.	"I Can't Live Without You"	5:02
11.	"The End"	1:20

No.	Title	Length
12.	"How Does It Feel" (Japanese Bonus Track)	3:55
13.	"Straight Down the Line" (Japanese Bonus Track)	4:59

==== Musicians ====
- Jack Blades – vocals, bass, percussion, acoustic guitar (11)
- Tommy Shaw – vocals, keyboards, guitars, percussion
- Steve Smith – drums (1–3, 5, 8–13)
- Michael Cartellone – drums (4, 6, 7)
- The Neverleave Brothers – backing vocals

==== Production ====
- Tommy Shaw – producer
- Jack Blades – producer
- Don Gehman – producer, recording, mixing
- Neil King – production engineer
- Jeff Lord-Alge – production engineer
- Jim Goodwin – assistant engineer
- Eddy Schreyer – mastering at Future Disc (Hollywood, California)
- Janet Levinson – art direction, design
- Reisig & Taylor – photography
- Cory Jacobs – studio photography, musician photography

=== Influence ===
Influence

Studio album by Shaw Blades
- Released: March 6, 2007
- Studio: Jack's Barn, Sonoma County, CA; Tommy's House, Los Angeles, CA
- Genre: Rock
- Length: 38:31
- Label: VH1 Classic Records
- Producer: Tommy Shaw; Jack Blades

Shaw Blades chronology
Hallucination (1995)	Influence (2007)

Professional ratings
Review scores
Source	Rating
AllMusic	3.5/5 stars

No.	Title	Writer(s)	Original Artist	Length
1.	"Summer Breeze"	Jim Seals; Dash Crofts	Seals and Crofts (1972)	3:33
2.	"Time of the Season"	Rod Argent	The Zombies (1968)	3:49
3.	"Your Move"	Jon Anderson; Chris Squire	Yes (1971)	3:42
4.	"I Am a Rock"	Paul Simon	Simon & Garfunkel (1966)	3:48
5.	"Lucky Man"	Greg Lake	Emerson, Lake & Palmer (1970)	4:36
6.	"The Sound of Silence"	Paul Simon	Simon & Garfunkel (1964)	3:12
7.	"California Dreamin'"	John Phillips; Michelle Phillips	The Mamas & The Papas (1963)	2:40
8.	"On a Carousel"	Graham Nash; Allan Clarke; Tony Hicks	The Hollies (1965)	3:25
9.	"Dirty Work"	Donald Fagen; Walter Becker	Steely Dan (1972)	3:13
10.	"For What It's Worth"	Stephen Stills	Buffalo Springfield (1967)	3:06
11.	"Dance With Me"	John Hall; Johanna Hall	Orleans (1975)	3:27
12.	"No Matter What" (Japanese Bonus Track)	Pete Ham	Badfinger (1970)	3:01

==== Musicians ====
- Jack Blades – Bass, Acoustic Guitar, Percussion, Vocals
- Tommy Shaw – Electric & Acoustic Guitars, Keyboards, Percussion, Vocals
- Michael Lardie – Keyboards
- Brian Tichy – Drums
- Kelly Keagy – Drums on "Dirty Work"
- Ben Krames – Drums on "Time of the Season"
- Colin Blades – Backing Vocals on "Your Move"
- Randy Mitchell – Loops

==== Production ====
- Tommy Shaw – Producer
- Jack Blades – Producer
- Michael Lardie – Engineer, Mixer
- Noel Golden – Mixer
- Dave Donelly – Mastering
- John Kalodner – Mastering
- Diane Burk – Album Coordination
- Leslie Langlo – Album Coordination
- Jeanne Shaw – Photos
- Jennifer Starr – Photos
- Scott Rosen – Photos

Track information and credits verified from the album's liner notes.

== In other media ==
"California Dreamin'" was used at the end of the last episode of season 2 of the TV show Californication.

"My Hallucination" was used in the movie Tommy Boy.
