= Ambition (Tommy Shaw album) =

Studio album by Tommy Shaw
- Released: 1987
- Recorded: 1987
- Studio: Livingston Studios (London, UK)
- Genre: Rock
- Length: 44:31
- Label: Atlantic
- Producer: Terry Thomas; Tommy Shaw

Tommy Shaw chronology
What If? (1985)	Ambition (1987)	7 Deadly Zens (1998)

Professional ratings
Review scores
Source	Rating
Allmusic	2.5/5 stars

Ambition is former Styx guitarist/vocalist Tommy Shaw's third solo album release. It was produced by Terry Thomas (from the rock band, Charlie) and has a very fluid and melodic sound with rich synthesizer chords and sequences. Originally released on Atlantic Records in 1987. The album was re-released on American Beat Records in 2007.

== Track listing ==
All words & music by Tommy Shaw & Terry Thomas unless where otherwise noted.

1. "No Such Thing" - 3:58
2. "Dangerous Game" - 4:53
3. "The Weight of the World" - 4:56
4. "Ambition" - 4:26
5. "Ever Since the World Began" (Frankie Sullivan, Jim Peterik)- 4:08
6. "Are You Ready for Me" - 4:18
7. "Somewhere in the Night" - 4:40
8. "Love You Too Much" - 4:03
9. "The Outsider" - 4:54
10. "Lay Them Down" (Shaw) - 4:15

== Personnel ==
- Tommy Shaw – lead vocals, backing vocals, lead guitar, guitars
- Terry Thomas – keyboards, guitars, drum programming, backing vocals
- Paul Wickens – keyboards
- Peter-John Vettese – additional keyboards (5)
- Christopher O'Shaughnessy – lead guitar (4, 6)
- Felix Krish – bass guitar, fretless bass, synth bass
- Tony Beard – drums
- Steve Alexander – percussion, drum overdubs, noises
- Richie Cannata – saxophones
- Lea Hart – backing vocals
- Dee Lewis – backing vocals
- Shirley Lewis – backing vocals
- Helena Springs – backing vocals
- James "JY" Young – backing vocals

=== Production ===
- Tommy Shaw – producer, arrangements
- Terry Thomas – producer, arrangements, mixing
- Simon Bohannon – recording
- Rafe McKenna – mixing (1–5, 7–10)
- Teri Reed – mixing (6)
- Jon Mallison – recording assistant, mix assistant
- Tony Harris – additional engineer
- George Schilling – additional engineer
- George Marino – mastering at Sterling Sound (New York, NY)
- Bob Defrin – art direction
- Carol Bobolts – design
- David Michael Kennedy – photography

== Singles ==
- "No Such Thing"
- "Ever Since the World Began" (#75 US)
