= Hannah Shaw (internet celebrity) =

American animal advocate and internet celebrity (born 1987)

- Born: Hannah René Shaw; July 9, 1987 (age 39)
- Other name: Kitten Lady
- Occupation: Internet celebrity
- Known for: Orphan Kitten Club
- Spouse: Andrew Marttila (m. 2023)
- Father: Tommy Shaw

Hannah Shaw (known as the Kitten Lady) is an animal welfare advocate and internet celebrity, known for being an educator on kittens.

== Career ==
After leaving a consulting job to create training materials for animal shelters, Shaw began a career as an animal fosterer who specializes in caring for kittens. She earned the moniker "Kitten Lady" from her efforts to educate the public in kitten rescue and foster care.

Shaw works as a foster parent for orphaned kittens, who would, otherwise, often be euthanized by animal shelters, due to a lack of resources and space to dedicate to neonatals. She informs others on how to foster kittens, reduce stray cat populations, and contribute to animal welfare through her videos on social media, in-person workshops, personal interviews, and public speaking events. She has also published several books on kitten rescue, or based on her fostering stories.

Shaw frequently posts on YouTube, Facebook, and Instagram. Her accounts and channel detail her rescue work, and feature instructional videos and posts on kitten fostering. Once the kittens featured in her videos are old enough, they are adopted out, with Shaw saying "Goodbye is the goal".

She runs her work through her nonprofit, the Orphan Kitten Club.

== Personal life ==
Shaw lives in San Diego with her husband, Andrew Marttila, a professional cat photographer. They met in 2016, moved in together the following year after a long-distance relationship, and were married at an animal sanctuary in 2023. The couple traveled the world interviewing other feline advocates and photographing cats in their respective communities for a collaborative book to be published in 2024.

Shaw is the daughter of Tommy Shaw, the co-frontman and guitarist for the rock band Styx.

== Publications ==
- Shaw, Hannah René (August 6, 2019). Tiny But Mighty: Kitten Lady's Guide to Saving the Most Vulnerable Felines. New York: Penguin Random House. ISBN 978-1-5247-4406-9. OCLC 1057730974.
- —— (October 8, 2019). Kitten Lady's Big Book of Little Kittens (First Aladdin hardcover ed.). New York: Aladdin Paperbacks. ISBN 978-1-5344-3894-1. OCLC 1088642928.
- —— (June 7, 2022). Adventures in Fosterland: Emmet and Jez. Illustrations by Bev Johnson. New York: Aladdin Paperbacks. ISBN 978-1-6659-0118-5. OCLC 1340702269.
- —— (June 7, 2022). Adventures in Fosterland: Super Spinach. Illustrations by Bev Johnson. New York: Aladdin Paperbacks. ISBN 978-1-6659-0125-3. OCLC 1340702548.
- —— (November 1, 2022). Kitten Lady's Cativity Book. Illustrations by Megan Lynn Kott. Boston: Harper Collins. ISBN 978-0-3587-2453-7. OCLC 1350354142.
- —— (January 10, 2023). Adventures in Fosterland: Baby Badger. Illustrations by Bev Johnson. New York: Aladdin Paperbacks. ISBN 978-1-6659-2555-6. OCLC 1330895662.
- —— (July 18, 2023). Adventures in Fosterland: Snowpea the Puppy Queen. Illustrations by Bev Johnson. New York: Aladdin Paperbacks. ISBN 978-1-6659-2560-0. OCLC 1347428102.
- —— (October 15, 2024). Cats of the World. Photographs by Andrew Jared Marttila. New York: Plume. ISBN 978-0-5931-8311-3.
