= High Enough =

1990 single by Damn Yankees

- US commercial cassette single

Single by Damn Yankees

from the album Damn Yankees
- B-side: "Piledriver"
- Released: September 22, 1990
- Genre: Glam metal
- Length: 4:45 (album version); 4:17 (single version)
- Label: Warner Bros.
- Songwriters: Tommy Shaw, Jack Blades, Ted Nugent
- Producer: Ron Nevison

Damn Yankees singles chronology
"Coming of Age" (1990)	"High Enough" (1990)	"Come Again" (1991)

"High Enough" is a song by American supergroup Damn Yankees from their self-titled debut album (1990). A power ballad, it is their most successful single in terms of chart position and sales, rising to No. 3 on the US Billboard Hot 100 chart, the group's first (and only) top-ten pop single. It also reached No. 2 on the US Mainstream Rock Tracks chart. The success of "High Enough" helped send its parent album into the top 20 on the US albums chart.

== Background ==
According to songwriter and co-lead vocalist Jack Blades:

'High Enough' was about how you love someone so much and you just don't want to scare them away. And it's like, do I take the next step? And then she freaks out when you go, 'I love you.' And it's like, 'What!?!? I'm outta here!' And you're, 'Wait a minute! Come back!' But then the girl comes back, because in the bridge it's, (singing) 'The next thing I remember I was running back for more.' You know how you get scared at first when you fall in love, and everybody freaks out, and that can't be right. And then you go, Wait a minute, this is great, let's forget about the past. Can you fly me over yesterday? Can you take me high enough to fly me over yesterday?

== Music video ==
The music video was filmed on location in River Ridge, Louisiana, and depicts a young drifter and his girlfriend who commit a series of robberies. However, their last one appears to have far more serious consequences as they become the targets of a manhunt by the local police. It is implied, but not specifically shown, that the drifter may have committed murder. The girlfriend is captured, but the drifter escapes and is cornered in his home by the police, who shoot the house full of bullets. The police invade the house, but the drifter's fate is unclear (possibly died during the gunfire). The girlfriend is given the death penalty and at the video's slowing end is being read her last rites by a priest while she is being led out of her cell to the execution chamber. As the video ends, the priest is revealed to be Ted Nugent.

== Track listings ==
7-inch and cassette single

1. "High Enough" (single version) – 4:17
2. "Piledriver" (album version) – 4:18

12-inch and CD single

1. "High Enough" (LP version) – 4:43
2. "Piledriver" (LP version) – 4:18
3. "Bonestripper" – 4:22

== Personnel ==
Damn Yankees

- Tommy Shaw: lead and backing vocals, acoustic and rhythm guitar
- Ted Nugent: lead guitar, backing and harmony vocals
- Jack Blades: lead and backing vocals, bass
- Michael Cartellone: drums, percussion

Additional personnel

- Alan Pasqua: Keyboards
- Jimmie Haskell: string arrangements
- Neverleave Brothers: backing vocals

== Charts ==
=== Weekly charts ===
Chart (1990–1991)	Peak position
Australia (ARIA)	57
Canada Top Singles (RPM)	12
New Zealand (Recorded Music NZ)	24
UK Singles (Official Charts)	81
US Billboard Hot 100	3
US Album Rock Tracks (Billboard)	2
US Cash Box Top 100	2

=== Year-end charts ===
Chart (1990)	Position
US Album Rock Tracks (Billboard)	47

Chart (1991)	Position
US Billboard Hot 100	14

== Certifications ==
Region	Certification	Certified units/sales
United States (RIAA)	Gold	500,000^{^}
^{^} Shipments figures based on certification alone.
