= Lawrence Gowan =

Canadian musician

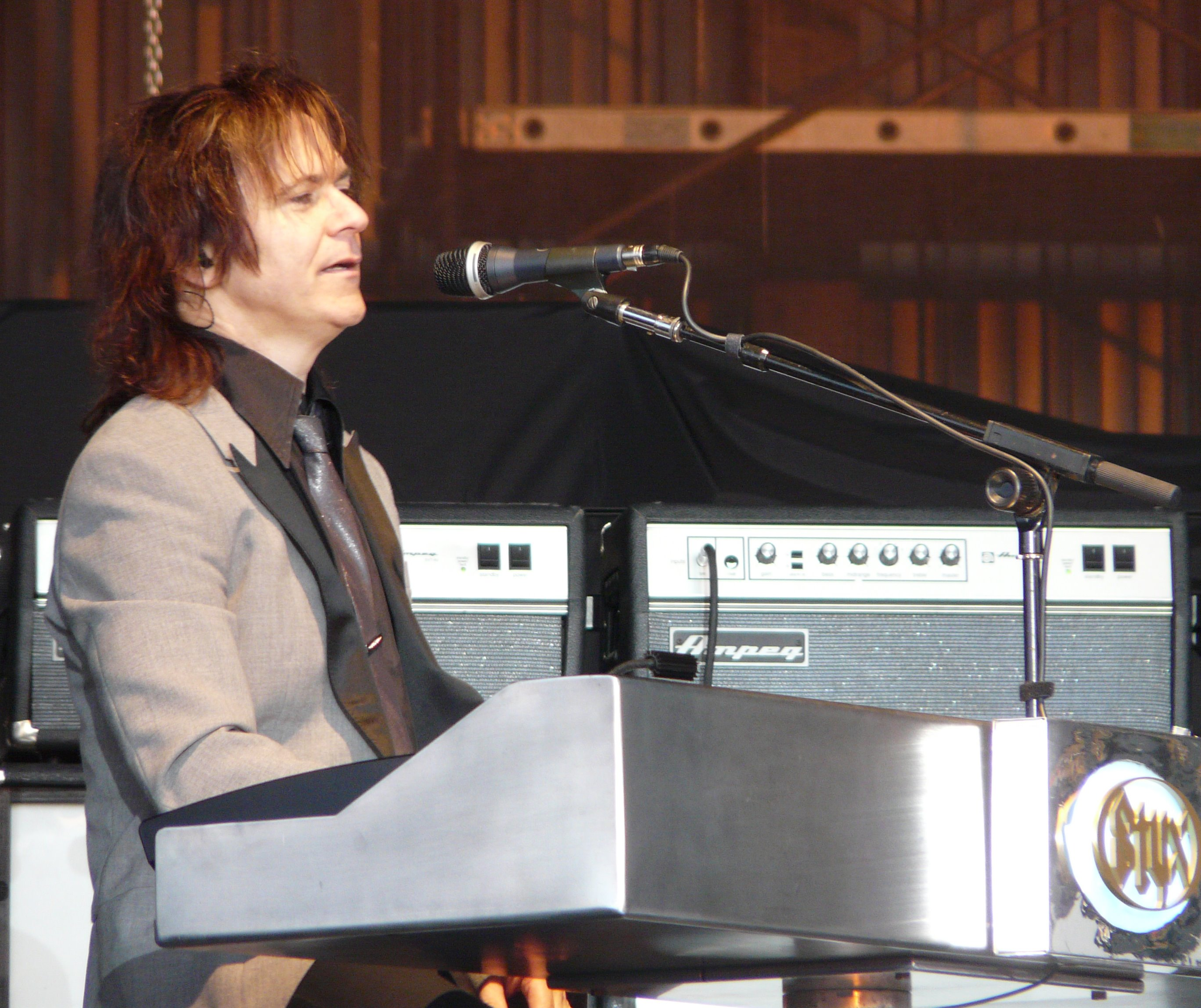
- Gowan performing with Styx in 2008

Background information
- Also known as: Gowan, Larry Gowan
- Born: Lawrence Gowan; 22 November 1956 (age 70); Glasgow, Scotland
- Origin: Scarborough, Ontario, Canada
- Genres: Hard rock; progressive rock; pop rock (early); soft rock (early)
- Occupations: Musician; singer; songwriter
- Instruments: Vocals; keyboards; guitar
- Years active: 1974–present
- Labels: Anthem; Columbia; Atlantic (outside Canada); Linus
- Website: lawrencegowan.com

Lawrence Henry Gowan (born 22 November 1956) is a Canadian singer and keyboardist. He is a solo artist under the stage name Gowan and has been vocalist and keyboardist of the band Styx since May 1999. His musical style is usually classified in the categories of pop and progressive rock.

== Early life ==
Lawrence Henry Gowan was born on 22 November 1956 in Glasgow, Scotland, the son of Patrick and Susan Gowan. He and his family immigrated to Canada where he was raised in the Toronto suburb of Scarborough, Ontario. Gowan showed an early interest in music when he watched the Beatles perform live on The Ed Sullivan Show. At the age of 8, Gowan's father gave him an acoustic guitar. He also began piano lessons at the age of 10.

Gowan attended Neil McNeil High School in Toronto.

== Career ==
At the age of 19, he earned an ARCT in classical piano performance from The Royal Conservatory of Music, in Toronto, Ontario. Upon graduation, he enjoyed modest local success with the band Rhinegold in 1976.

After the band broke up five years later, he began a solo career, releasing his first album under the name Gowan in 1982, which was produced by Rob Freeman and featured Kim Mitchell of Max Webster on guitar. This album contained the singles "Victory", "Give In" and "Keep Up the Fight".

After his 1982 debut album Gowan did not fare well, Gowan "found himself naturally gravitating" to the Queen Street West music scene that was developing in Toronto in the mid-1980s. Still signed to Columbia Records, the label agreed to fund his next album. Gowan spent a year writing songs, and also travelled to Scotland and Ireland to trace his heritage. While there, he received a telephone call from English record producer David Tickle, who said he would produce the album and arranged a recording session. Tickle secured the services of several session musicians from Peter Gabriel's backing band for the recording session, including bassist Tony Levin, drummer Jerry Marotta, and guitarist David Rhodes. The album Strange Animal was recorded at Startling Studios owned by Ringo Starr and was his commercial breakthrough in Canada. The album spawned the hit singles "A Criminal Mind", "(You're a) Strange Animal", "Guerilla Soldier" and "Cosmetics". That year he won a CASBY Award for most promising male artist.

His 1987 follow up Great Dirty World gave him another hit single with "Moonlight Desires", featuring Jon Anderson (from Yes) on backing vocals, as well as "Dedication".

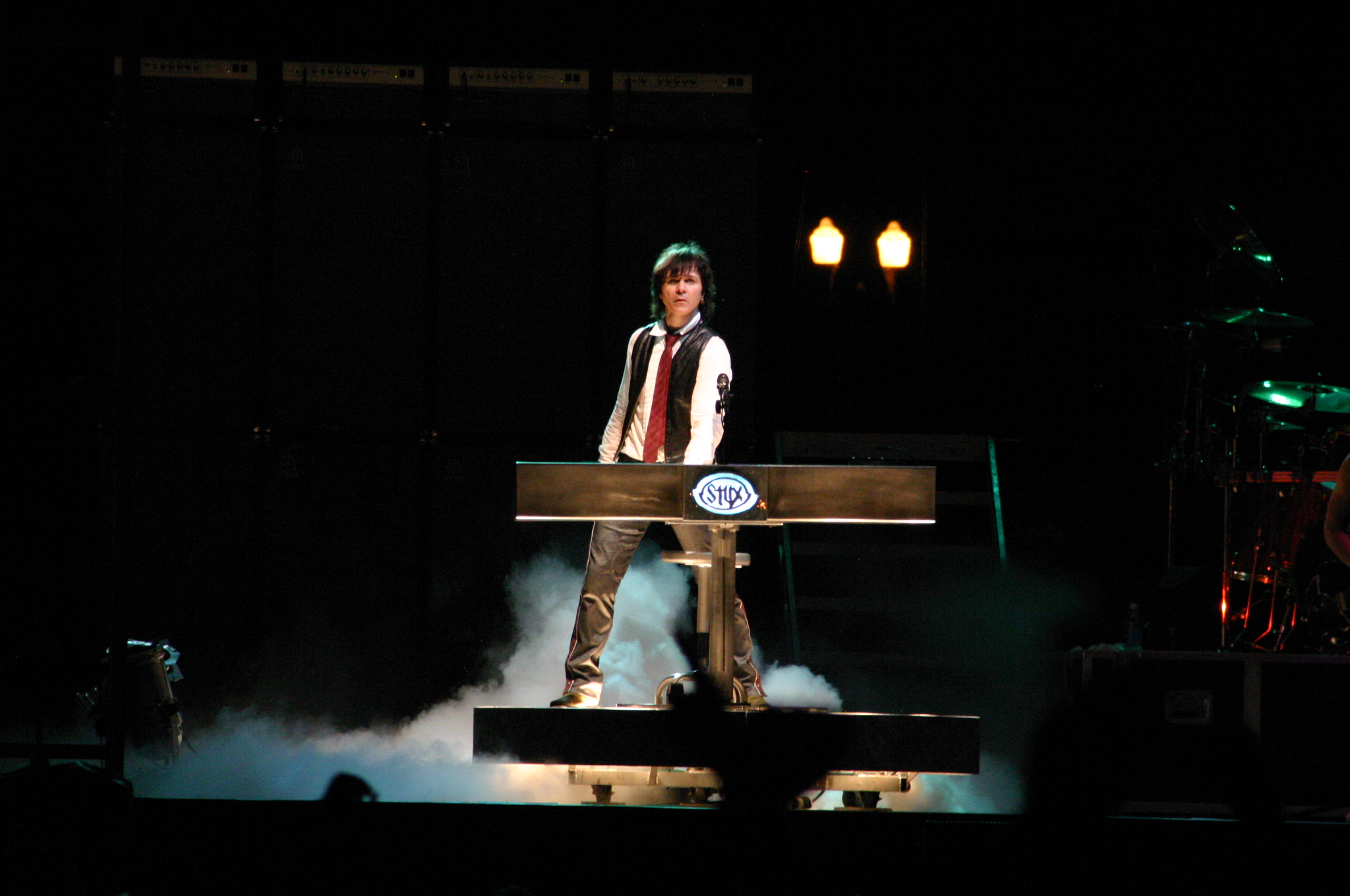
Lawrence Gowan in 2006 at a Styx show.

Although he was very successful in Canada, all three of Gowan's albums had been issued in the US to virtually no attention, and he was dropped by Columbia Records. 1990's Lost Brotherhood, recorded at Metalworks Studios in Mississauga, Ontario, had a harder rock sound, and featured such players as Red Rider member Ken Greer, former Coney Hatch guitarist Steve Shelski and Rush's Alex Lifeson. It produced the singles "Lost Brotherhood", "All the Lovers in the World", and "Out of a Deeper Hunger". This was Gowan's first album for Anthem Records.

A few bars from "The Dragon" can be heard playing on a car radio in the 1990 movie "Navy Seals" and appears on the original motion picture soundtrack.

He released the more acoustic ...But You Can Call Me Larry in 1993 under his full name, returning to the Canadian pop charts with "When There's Time for Love", "Soul's Road" and "Dancing on My Own Ground". International success was not forthcoming, though, and Anthem dropped Gowan from their roster. He subsequently released The Good Catches Up independently in 1995, which featured the single "Guns and God", which received moderate airplay in Canada. Also that same year, Gowan was part of an all-star lineup at Toronto's Massey Hall to celebrate Ronnie Hawkins' 60th birthday, as documented on the album Let It Rock, sharing the stage with veteran rockers Jerry Lee Lewis, Carl Perkins and The Band. In 1997, Gowan released two live CDs: Sololive – No Kilt Tonight containing a rendition of Ragtime's classic "King Chanticleer Rag", and Au Québec with a cover of Harmonium's "Pour un instant" as well as his first composition in French, "Stéphanie", for his fan base in Quebec.

In 1997, Gowan released "Healing Waters" as a tribute to Diana, Princess of Wales after her death. "Healing Waters" was initially an unreleased song from Gowan, though it was used in its original form in the 1996 Jeff Wincott movie, When the Bullet Hits the Bone.

In 1998, Gowan was the recipient of the National Achievement Award at the annual SOCAN Awards in Toronto.

His song "A Criminal Mind" was covered in 2005 by Canadian hip-hop artist Maestro; Gowan appears in the video and his vocals are sampled on the track. The song was also covered by Canadian gypsy jazz music group The Lost Fingers. The song was sampled in a song performed by Akon and Freck Billionaire.

He also guest-starred on the Canadian animated comedy series Chilly Beach.

In February 2006, Gowan did four orchestra-accompanied concerts in London, Ontario and Kitchener, Ontario. Also in 2006, his home was featured on MTV's Cribs.

In March 2010, Gowan released "Return of the Strange Animal", a remastered version of 1985's "Strange Animal" plus a making-of documentary and music videos on DVD. In May 2010, Gowan performed two solo shows in support of the 25th anniversary of the "Strange Animal" album.

In May 2012, Gowan re-issued a remastered version of 1987's "Great Dirty World".

As of 2012, Gowan was recording a new solo album which he hoped to have completed sometime in 2013, but has yet to be released.

Gowan acquired the master tapes to his catalogue from CBS Records International in the 2010s, and assigned them to Linus Entertainment under the True North Records label.

On 11 October 2012, Gowan appeared on episode 29 of John Wants Answers.

On 13 October 2013, Gowan played a solo concert, titled 'In Kilt Tonight' at the Glenn Gould Studio in Toronto, Ontario, Canada. All proceeds were donated to McDermott House Canada, a charitable organization.

== Styx ==
In 1997, during Styx's tour, Gowan performed as a supporting act for Styx at Montreal's Molson Centre and Quebec City's Colisée.

Tommy Shaw admired his talent and vibrant stage charisma, and called him in May 1999 asking him to tour with them for 53 dates, temporarily replacing their lead singer Dennis DeYoung who had fallen ill. Gowan permanently replaced the lead singer after the tour. Since then, Gowan's classic hit, "A Criminal Mind", is often played by Styx.

Styx had long been plagued by differences in artistic inclination. DeYoung's absence created an opportunity for a more permanent restructuring of Styx. Gowan subsequently became the band's permanent vocalist.

Styx's 2003 album Cyclorama was Gowan's first studio album with the band. Gowan sings two songs on Cyclorama, "Fields of the Brave" and "More Love for the Money", both of which have an easily recognizable Gowan signature. He then continued recording with Styx for their 2005 album, Big Bang Theory. Although praised by fans, the album sold few copies.

Gowan continues with Styx to the present and is featured on many live releases from the band. The band released studio recordings of older Styx songs with the new line-up, titled Regeneration (released in two volumes in 2010 and 2011), and Gowan sings lead vocals on several tracks that were originally recorded by Dennis DeYoung.

In May 2017, Styx announced their new album The Mission and revealed the first single "Gone, Gone, Gone" featuring Gowan on lead vocals. It received little airplay in the U.S. and did not chart. On the album, Gowan also does lead vocals for "The Greater Good", "Time May Bend", and "The Outpost". He also composed an instrumental piece called "Khedive".. Both albums were critically praised, but sold few copies and did not chart any singles.

== Awards and nominations ==
The following are Gowan's Juno nominations:

- 1983 – Nominated – "Most Promising Male Vocalist of the Year"
- 1985 – Winner – "Best Video" for "A Criminal Mind" with director Rob Quartly animation and direction by Greg Duffell / Lightbox Studios Inc.
- 1985 – Winner – "Best Album Graphics" for Strange Animal (awarded to designers Rob MacIntyre and Dimo Safari)
- 1985 – Nominated – "Male Vocalist of the Year"
- 1985 – Nominated – "Album of the Year" for Strange Animal
- 1985 – Nominated – "Best Selling Single" for "A Criminal Mind"
- 1985 – Nominated – "Best Video" for "(You're a) Strange Animal" animation by Greg Duffell / Lightbox Studios Inc.
- 1986 – Nominated – "Best Video" for "Cosmetics" (director: Rob Quartly)
- 1987 – Nominated – "Male Vocalist of the Year"
- 1987 – Nominated – "Album of the Year" for Great Dirty World
- 1987 – Nominated – "Canadian Entertainer of the Year"
- 1991 – Nominated – "Male Vocalist of the Year"

In 1995, Gowan was presented with the SOCAN award for songs that have won major airplay in 1995 for his song, "Dancing on My Own Ground".

On 16 November 1998, Gowan received the National Achievement Award from the Society of Composers, Authors and Music Publishers of Canada (SOCAN).

In 2003, Gowan was presented with the SOCAN award (along with three other musicians) for songs that have surpassed the 100,000 radio-airplay mark for his song, "Moonlight Desires".

In 2011, Gowan was presented with a star on the Scarborough Walk of Fame – Entertainment.

In 2013, Gowan announced he was recording a new studio album, complete with new original material. The album is apparently in production in downtown Toronto at a private studio. According to Gowan, the album is based on an old concept album by Rhinegold, which was written and conceived in the mid-1970s, during their rounds of the Toronto club scene.

In 2018, Gowan's song "A Criminal Mind" was certified as a Platinum Single in Canada, surpassing a combined 80,000 physical 7" and digital downloaded units sold. Gowan was presented with the plaque on stage at his show in Windsor, Ontario at The Colosseum at Caesars Windsor .

== Backing band ==
Starting with the Strange Animal tour in 1985, Gowan has worked with many backing musicians for his live performances throughout his solo career, some of which have even made contributions to his studio albums. Gowan’s tenure in Styx initially interrupted his solo career, which went on hiatus from 1999 until 2010, excluding one off performances throughout the 2000s.

=== Current members ===
- Terry Gowan – bass, backing vocals (1985–1993, 2010–present)
- Derek Sharp – guitar, backing vocals (2025–present)
- Ryan Bovaird – keyboards (2016–present)
- Dylan Gowan - Drums, percussion (2020–present)
- Sekou Lumumba – Drums, percussion (2025–present)

=== Former members ===
- Danny J. Ricardo – guitar (2010–2014)
- Ricky Tillo – guitar (2016)
- Bob McAlpine – guitar, backing vocals (1985–1986, 2017–2025)
- Pete Nunn – keyboards (1984–1987, 2010–2013)
- Emm Gryner – keyboards, backing vocals (2014)
- Todd Sucherman – drums, percussion (2010–2020, 2025)
- Taylor Mills – backing vocals (2010–2012)
- Divine Brown – backing vocals (2016)
- SATE (Saidah Baba Talibah) – backing vocals (2017)

== Personal life ==
Gowan is married to Jan Gowan and has two children. His son Dylan Gowan is the drummer for the symphonic metal band Seven Spires.

== Discography ==
=== Solo albums ===
Title	Release	Peak chart positions
Title	Release	CAN
Gowan	1982	82
Strange Animal	1985	5
Great Dirty World	1987	4
Lost Brotherhood	1990	26
...But You Can Call Me Larry	1993	60
The Good Catches Up	1995	—

=== Live albums ===
- Solo Live: No Kilt Tonight (1996)
- Gowan au Québec (1997)

=== Compilation albums ===
- Best of... (1997)
- Home Field (1998)

=== DVDs ===
- Gowan Live in Concert (2006)

=== with Styx ===
==== Studio albums ====
- Cyclorama (2003)
- Big Bang Theory (2005)
- The Mission (2017)
- Crash of the Crown (2021)
- Circling from Above (2025)

==== Live albums ====
- Arch Allies: Live at Riverport (2000)
- Styx World: Live 2001 (2001)
- At the River's Edge: Live in St. Louis (2002)
- 21st Century Live (2003)
- One with Everything: Styx and the Contemporary Youth Orchestra (2006)
- The Grand Illusion/Pieces of Eight - Live (2012)
- Live at the Orleans Arena, Las Vegas (2015)

=== Solo singles ===
Title	Release	Peak chart positions		Album
Title	Release	CAN	CAN AC	Album
"Keep Up the Fight"	1982	—	—	Gowan
"Make It Alone"	1982	—	—	Gowan
"A Criminal Mind"	1985	5	14	Strange Animal
"(You're a) Strange Animal"	1985	15	—	Strange Animal
"Guerilla Soldier"	1985	24	—	Strange Animal
"Cosmetics"	1985	41	—	Strange Animal
"Moonlight Desires"	1987	10	2	Great Dirty World
"Awake the Giant"	1987	36	—	Great Dirty World
"Living in the Golden Age"	1987	78	—	Great Dirty World
"All the Lovers in the World"	1990	6	6	Lost Brotherhood
"Lost Brotherhood"	1990	44	—	Lost Brotherhood
"Out of a Deeper Hunger"	1990	36	17	Lost Brotherhood
"When There's Time (For Love)"	1993	6	11	...but you can call me Larry
"Dancing on My Own Ground"	1994	15	17	...but you can call me Larry
"Soul's Road"	1994	13	15	...but you can call me Larry
"Your Stone Walls"	1994	46	—	...but you can call me Larry
"Heart of Gold"	1995	88	46	Borrowed Tunes: A Tribute to Neil Young
"I'll Be There in a Minute"	1995	41	—	The Good Catches Up
"Guns and God"	1995	14	20	The Good Catches Up
"Laura"	1996	—	33	The Good Catches Up
"The Good Catches Up"	1996	18	21	The Good Catches Up
"Get It While You Can"	1997	21	—	The Good Catches Up
"Healing Waters"	1997	—	13	Best of...
"—" denotes a recording that did not chart.
