= What If (Tommy Shaw album) =

What If?

Studio album by Tommy Shaw
- Released: 1985
- Recorded: 1985
- Studio: Chicago Recording Company (Chicago, Illinois)
- Genre: Rock
- Length: 42:21
- Label: A&M
- Producer: Richie Cannata; Tommy Shaw

Tommy Shaw chronology
Girls with Guns (1984)	What If? (1985)	Ambition (1987)

Singles from What If
- 1. "Remo's Theme (What If)" Released: September 1985; 2. "Jealousy" Released: December 1985

Professional ratings
Review scores
Source	Rating
Allmusic	3/5 stars

What If is an album by former Styx guitarist Tommy Shaw, released in 1985. It was his second solo release. The album received somewhat favorable reviews. The album peaked at #87 on the Billboard 200.

The album is named after the track "Remo's Theme (What If)", which is the theme song for the character Remo Williams in the movie Remo Williams: The Adventure Begins. The song was not released on a soundtrack and was first made available on What If.

== Track listing ==
All words and music by Tommy Shaw, except as indicated. The track "Friendly Advice" was moved to the end for the reissue.

1. "Jealousy" - 4:43
2. "Remo's Theme (What If)" (Shaw, Richie Cannata) - 4:23
3. "Reach for the Bottle" - 5:44
4. "Friendly Advice" - 3:29
5. "This Is Not a Test" - 3:26
6. "See Me Now" - 3:45
7. "True Confessions" (Shaw, Cannata) - 3:27
8. "Count on You" - 6:09
9. "Nature of the Beast" - 4:04
10. "Bad Times" - 2:44

== Personnel ==
- Tommy Shaw – vocals, keyboards, guitars
- Richie Cannata – keyboards, saxophones
- Gary Myrick – electric guitars (4, 8)
- Brian Stanley – bass guitar
- Steve Holley – drums (1–9), percussion
- Mark Marshall – drums (10)
- The Phenix Horns – horns
  - Don Myrick – saxophones
  - Louis Satterfield – trombone
  - Rahmlee Michael Davis – trumpet
  - Michael Harris – trumpet
- Kim Criswell – backing vocals
- Jo Belle Yonely – backing vocals

=== Production ===
- Richie Cannata – producer
- Tommy Shaw – producer
- Tom Hanson – recording
- Dennis Tousana – recording assistant
- Greg Ladanyi – mixing
- Mike "Spike" Drake – mix assistant
- The Mastering Lab (Hollywood, California) – mastering location
- Chuck Beeson – art direction
- Jeff Gold – art direction
- Donald Krieger – design
- Howard Rosenberg – photography
- Neil Zlozower – inner sleeve group shot photography
- Jerry Kramer – management
