= Moonlight Desires =

1987 song by Lawrence Gowan

Single by Lawrence Gowan

from the album Great Dirty World
- Released: March 1987
- Recorded: Producers Studios, Los Angeles, California
- Genre: Soft rock
- Length: 4:13
- Label: Columbia
- Songwriter: Lawrence Gowan
- Producer: David Tickle

Lawrence Gowan singles chronology
"Cosmetics" (1985)	"Moonlight Desires" (1987)	"Awake the Giant" (1987)

"Moonlight Desires" is a song by Scottish-born Canadian musician Lawrence Gowan. Released in March 1987 as the lead single from his third studio album, Great Dirty World, it reached number ten in Canada. Yes's Jon Anderson, walking by the studio, heard the song being played, entered and asked if he could add a harmony vocal, and made it up on the spot. This single had a b-side called "Jet White," which was recorded in 1982 and originally appeared on Gowan's self-titled debut album.

== Music video ==
The video was directed by Rob Quartly and was filmed in Mexico, with several of the scenes being filmed at Teotihuacan.

== Popular culture ==
The song was used to soundtrack a key scene in the 2019 film Black Conflux. It is also used in the Degrassi television movie School's Out (1992), and as a title for the nineteenth episode of the fourth season of Degrassi: The Next Generation (2005).

== Charts ==
Chart (1987)	Peak position
Canada Adult Contemporary (RPM)	2
Canada Top Singles (RPM)	10
