= Cyclorama (album) =

Studio album by Styx
- Released: February 18, 2003
- Recorded: 2002
- Studios: Various: Pumpkin Studios, Chicago, IL; The S.H.O.P., Los Angeles, CA; Dr CAW Recording, Northbrook, IL; Colorado Sound, Denver, CO; Capitol Studios, Hollywood, CA; The Cave, Los Angeles, CA; Seventeenth Avenue Productions, Manville, NJ; Pond, North Brunswick, NJ; Your Place or Mine, Glendale, CA
- Genres: Hard rock, progressive rock
- Length: 57:59
- Label: Sanctuary/CMC International
- Producers: Tommy Shaw, James "JY" Young, Gary Loizzo

Styx chronology
Brave New World (1999)	Cyclorama (2003)	Big Bang Theory (2005)

Singles from Cyclorama
- 1. "Waiting for Our Time" Released: 2003

Professional ratings
Review scores
Source	Rating
411Mania	(10/10)
AllMusic	2.5/5 stars
Chicago Tribune	(unfavorable)
Melodic.net	3.5/5 stars
Rolling Stone	2/5 stars

Cyclorama is the fourteenth studio album by the American rock band Styx, released in 2003. This was the first studio album with Lawrence Gowan, following the departure of group co-founder Dennis DeYoung in 1999. It is also the second of two albums to feature Glen Burtnik (the former being 1990's Edge of the Century), and the only album released by the Lawrence Gowan/Tommy Shaw/James "JY" Young/Glen Burtnik/Chuck Panozzo/Todd Sucherman lineup, and as such the only original Styx album to feature four different singer-songwriters (Shaw, Young, Gowan and Burtnik) as opposed to the usual three. The album peaked significantly higher on the Billboard album charts than Styx's previous release, Brave New World (1999), ending up 48 slots higher at No. 127 (1 week), but paled in comparison to previous 1970s and 1980s releases on A&M Records.

The album's first single was "Waiting for Our Time," which failed to chart on the Billboard Hot 100 singles chart. It charted at #37 for 1 week on the Mainstream Rock charts. A video was released for the single "Yes I Can," but it failed to chart.

The album was also released as a "Dual Disc," with the reverse side of the disc containing a 5.1 DVD-Audio mix as well as music videos. The album was finally released to streaming services in 2020.

== Track listing ==
All credits adapted from the original release.

All tracks are written by Glen Burtnik, Lawrence Gowan, Tommy Shaw, Todd Sucherman, and James "JY" Young, except where noted.

No.	Title	Writer(s)	Lead vocals	Length
1.	"Do Things My Way"		Shaw	4:57
2.	"Waiting for Our Time"		Shaw	4:12
3.	"Fields of the Brave"		Gowan	3:23
4.	"Bourgeois Pig"		Billy Bob Thornton	0:49
5.	"Kiss Your Ass Goodbye"	Burtnik	Burtnik, background vocals by Tenacious D	3:13
6.	"These Are the Times"		Young	6:45
7.	"Yes I Can"	Shaw, Jack Blades, Gowan, Burtnik, Young, Sucherman	Shaw & Burtnik	3:50
8.	"More Love for the Money"		Gowan	3:47
9.	"Together"		Shaw	4:46
10.	"Fooling Yourself (Palm of Your Hands)"	Shaw	Shaw, background vocals by Brian Wilson	0:39
11.	"Captain America"		Young	3:53
12.	"Killing the Thing That You Love"	Burtnik, Shaw, Gowan, Young, Sucherman, Bob Burger	Burtnik	5:36
13.	"One with Everything"		Shaw	5:56
14.	"Genki Desu Ka" (with hidden Tenacious D skit and track, "The Chosen One")		Shaw, Burtnik, John Waite, Jude Cole, Gary Loizzo	6:13

== Personnel ==
=== Styx ===
- Tommy Shaw – vocals, acoustic and electric guitars, mandolin
- James "JY" Young – vocals, electric guitars
- Lawrence Gowan – vocals, keyboards
- Glen Burtnik – vocals, electric and upright bass, synth bass on "Genki Desu Ka", 12 string guitar on "Together"
- Chuck Panozzo –bass on "Bourgeois Pig", backing vocals on "Kiss Your Ass Goodbye"
- Todd Sucherman – drums, percussion, loops, synth bass on "Do Things My Way", vocals

=== Additional personnel ===
- Jude Cole
- Gary Loizzo of American Breed
- Tenacious D (Jack Black and Kyle Gass)
- Billy Bob Thornton
- John Waite
- Brian Wilson

=== Production ===
- Producers: Tommy Shaw, James "JY" Young, Gary Loizzo
- Associate producers: Lawrence Gowan, Todd Sucherman, Glen Burtnik
- Engineers: Gary Loizzo, Charlie Pakaari, Craig Williams, Mark Linnett, Plinky Giglio, Dave Yackoboskie, Jimmy Hoyson, Jim Mitchell, Bruce Monical

== Charts ==
Chart (2003)	Peak position
US Billboard 200	127
