= Big Bang Theory (Styx album) =

Studio album by Styx
- Released: May 10, 2005
- Recorded: 2004
- Studios: Pumpkin Studios (Chicago); The Shop (Los Angeles); Ocean Way (Los Angeles); Colorado Sound (Denver); CRC (Chicago); The Salt Mine (Nashville)
- Genre: Rock
- Length: 55:57
- Label: New Door
- Producers: Gary Loizzo & Styx

Styx chronology
Cyclorama (2003)	Big Bang Theory (2005)	The Mission (2017)

Professional ratings
Review scores
Source	Rating
AllMusic	3.5/5 stars
Melodic.net	2/5 stars
Sea of Tranquility	3.5/5 stars

Big Bang Theory is the fifteenth studio album and the first covers album by the American rock band Styx, released in 2005. It consists of cover versions of classic rock songs.

== Origin ==
In 2004, Styx performed a cover of the Beatles song "I Am the Walrus" at Eric Clapton's Crossroads Festival, where the song was received so well that it was released as a single. The video featured original bassist Chuck Panozzo as the "eggman". The single's success resulted in the band recording this album of cover songs. As a result of an appearance on the Today Show the week of the album's launch, the album reached No. 46 on the Billboard Top 200 Albums chart, Styx's first time in the top 50 since 1983's Kilroy Was Here. However, the album only charted for one week. The single "I Am the Walrus" reached a high of number 27 on the Billboard Heritage Rock Chart, but failed to chart on any other rock or pop chart.

== Track listing ==
1. "I Am the Walrus" (the Beatles cover) - 4:41
  - Lead vocals: Gowan
2. "I Can See for Miles" (the Who cover) - 4:28
  - Lead vocals: Shaw
3. "Can't Find My Way Home" (Blind Faith cover) - 3:24
  - Lead vocals: Shaw
4. "It Don't Make Sense (You Can't Make Peace)" (Willie Dixon cover) - 4:10
  - Lead vocals: J. Young
5. "I Don't Need No Doctor" (Ray Charles cover, a la Humble Pie) - 4:23
  - Lead vocals: Gowan
6. "One Way Out" (the Allman Brothers Band cover) - 4:42
  - Lead vocals: Shaw
7. "A Salty Dog" (Procol Harum cover) - 4:01
  - Lead vocals: Gowan
8. "Summer in the City" (the Lovin' Spoonful cover) - 3:25
  - Lead vocals: Shaw
9. "Manic Depression" (the Jimi Hendrix Experience cover) - 3:59
  - Lead vocals: J. Young
10. "Talkin' About the Good Times" (the Pretty Things cover) - 3:57
  - Lead vocals: Gowan
11. "Locomotive Breath" (Jethro Tull cover) - 3:33
  - Lead vocals: J. Young
12. "Find the Cost of Freedom" (Crosby, Stills, Nash & Young cover) - 1:04
  - Lead vocals: Styx
13. "Wishing Well" (Free cover) - 3:40
  - Lead vocals: Shaw
14. "Blue Collar Man @ 2120" (rerecording of a Styx song) - 6:30
  - Lead vocals: Shaw

== Personnel ==
=== Styx ===
- Tommy Shaw – vocals, guitars
- James "JY" Young – vocals, guitars
- Lawrence Gowan – vocals, keyboards
- Ricky Phillips – bass
- Todd Sucherman – drums

=== Additional musicians ===
- The Oracle Diva – guest vocals on "It Don't Make Sense (You Can't Make Peace)" and "Wishing Well"
- Johnnie Johnson – piano on "Blue Collar Man @ 2120"
- Koko Taylor – guest vocals on "Blue Collar Man @ 2120"

=== Production ===
- Gary Loizzo – producer, engineer, remixing
- Derek Downing, John Maschoff, Mike Pierce – assistant engineers
- Dan Stout – mastering at Colossal Mastering, Chicago

== Charts ==
Chart (2005)	Peak position
US Billboard 200	46
