= Michael Cartellone =

American drummer (born 1962)

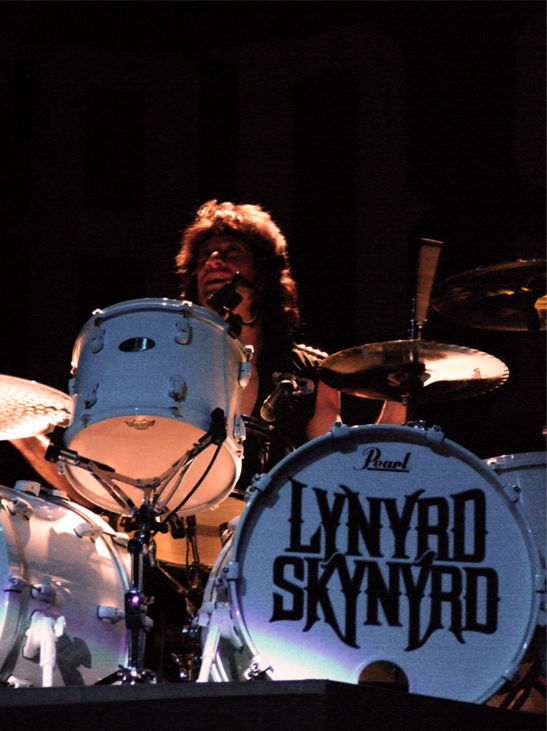
- Cartellone performing in 2009

Background information
- Born: June 7, 1962 (age 64); Cleveland, Ohio, U.S.
- Genres: Southern rock; hard rock; heavy metal; progressive rock
- Occupations: Musician; artist
- Instrument: Drums
- Years active: 1973–present
- Member of: Lynyrd Skynyrd
- Formerly of: Damn Yankees
- Website: michaelcartellone.com

Michael Cartellone (born June 7, 1962) is an American musician and artist. He was a founding member of Damn Yankees and is the current drummer of Lynyrd Skynyrd since 1999.

== Biography ==
Michael Cartellone's family is of Sicilian origin, specifically Bronte, Sicily. The name is the Anglicized version of Cartillone.

Cartellone is the former drummer of Damn Yankees (1989–1996, 1998–2001) and a former drummer for Accept (1996). After Damn Yankees broke up, Cartellone worked as the touring drummer for Ted Nugent and later John Fogerty before settling in with Lynyrd Skynyrd.

Cartellone has toured and recorded with a wide variety of artists including Adrian Belew, Jack Blades (after the dissolution of Damn Yankees), Cher, John Fogerty, Peter Frampton, Brad Gillis, Wolf Hoffmann, Eddie Jobson, Freddie Mercury, Tommy Shaw (before and after the formation of Damn Yankees), Shaw Blades, Joe Lynn Turner, and John Wetton.

Cartellone is the drummer on former Faith No More singer Chuck Mosley's 2009 album, Will Rap Over Hard Rock for Food.

He is also a painter, a fan of Charlie Chaplin and the Cleveland Indians.

Cartellone uses Pearl drums, pedals and hardware and Zildjian cymbals, most notably the A and A custom series, but previously used the Z custom series in the past, and he also uses Remo drumheads.

== Discography ==
Boy Wonder

- Boy Wonder, 1982 (as Michael Crislin)

Damn Yankees

- Damn Yankees, 1990
- Don't Tread, 1992
- Extended Versions, 2008

Freddie Mercury

- "In My Defence", The Great Pretender, 1992

Vince Neil

- "You're Invited But Your Friends Can't Come", Encino Man (Music From The Original Motion Picture Soundtrack), 1992

Brad Gillis

- Gilrock Ranch, 1993

John Wetton

- Battle Lines, 1994
- The Studio Recordings Anthology, 2015

Shaw Blades

- Hallucination, 1995

Accept

- Predator, 1996

Peter Frampton

- "The Frightened City", Twang! – A Tribute To Hank Marvin & The Shadows 1996

Wolf Hoffmann

- Classical, 1997

Lynyrd Skynyrd

- Edge of Forever, 1999
- Christmas Time Again, 2000
- Vicious Cycle, 2003
- Lynyrd Skynyrd Lyve: The Vicious Cycle Tour, 2004
- God & Guns, 2009
- Live from Freedom Hall, 2010
- Last of a Dyin' Breed, 2012
- Pronounced 'Lĕh-'nérd 'Skin-'nérd & Second Helping Live From Jacksonville At The Florida Theatre, 2015

Steve Fister

- Age of Great Dreams, 1999

Jack Blades

- Jack Blades, 2004

Joe Lynn Turner

- Second Hand Life, 2007

Joe Bouchard

- Jukebox in My Head, 2009

Chuck Mosley

- Will Rap Over Hard Rock for Food, 2009
