= Tommy Shaw =

American rock musician (born 1953)

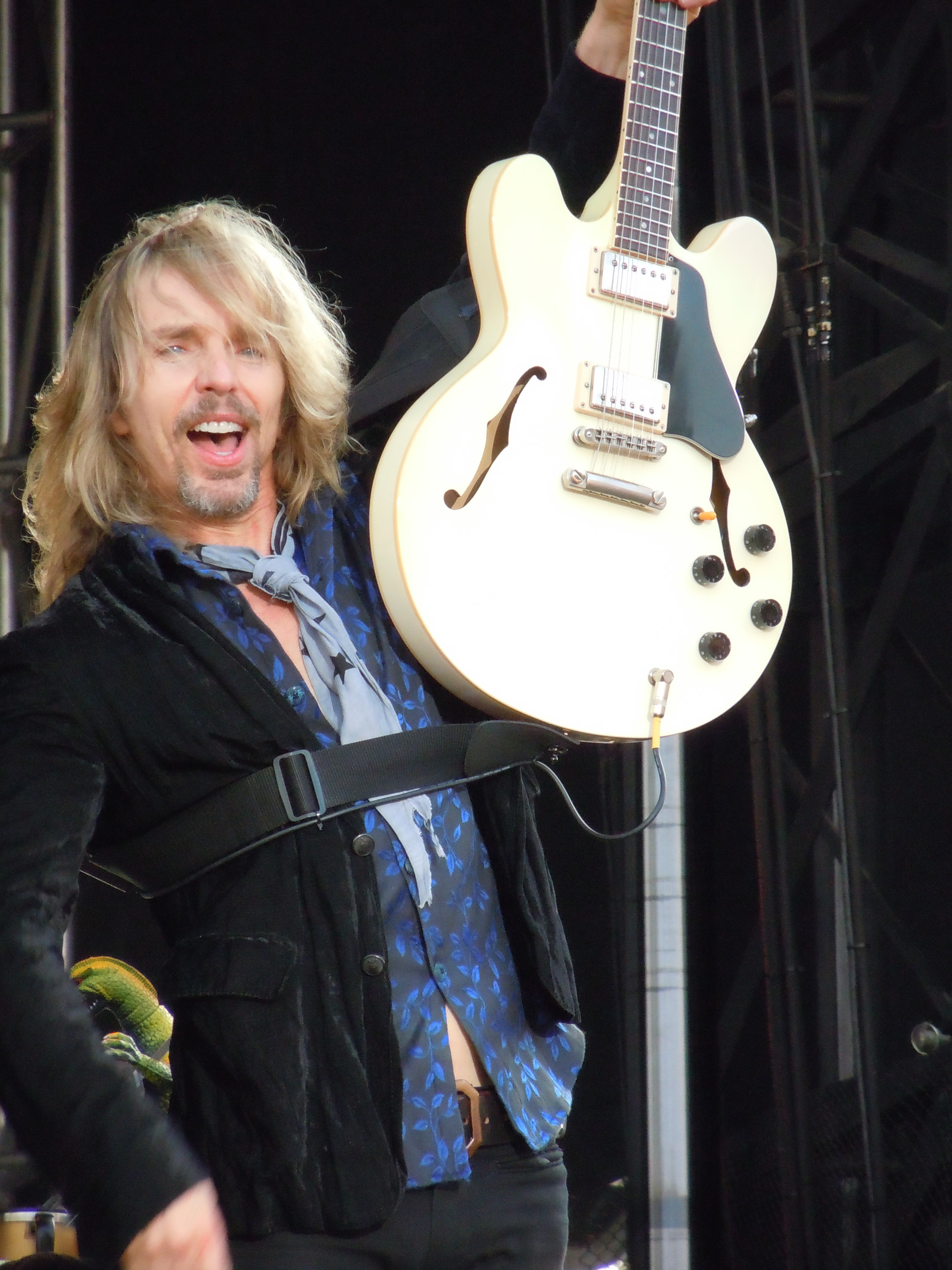
- Shaw performing with Styx in 2010

Background information
- Born: Tommy Roland Shaw; September 11, 1953 (age 73); Montgomery, Alabama, U.S.
- Genres: Rock; hard rock; progressive rock
- Occupations: Musician; singer; songwriter
- Instruments: Vocals; guitar
- Years active: 1967–present
- Member of: Styx; Shaw Blades
- Formerly of: Damn Yankees; MSFunk
- Website: tommyshaw.net

Tommy Roland Shaw (born September 11, 1953) is an American musician best known for his tenure in the rock band Styx as co-lead vocalist. In between his stints with Styx, he has played with other groups including Damn Yankees and Shaw Blades as well as releasing several solo albums.

== Early life and music career ==
Tommy Shaw was born in Montgomery, Alabama, and played with many local bands in his early years. He left Montgomery after attending Robert E. Lee High School to join The Smoke Ring and then MSFunk, a Chicago-managed outfit that he played with for three years, which gave him a chance to be noticed by Styx during a two-week club gig in Chicago. After MSFunk disbanded, he went back to Montgomery to join a local group called Harvest with his childhood friends. Following Styx's move to A&M, guitarist and vocalist John Curulewski suddenly left the band shortly before they were to embark on a nationwide tour and a frantic search to find a last-minute replacement was launched. As a result of his previous experience with MSFunk in Chicago, Shaw got the call to audition for Styx. Shaw said: "I got on the plane and went up there the next day, and they didn't ask me to play the guitar at all. The guitar never came out of the case." Once Styx had listened to Shaw's demo tape and Shaw had proven he could sing the high harmony in "Lady", he was hired.

=== 1970s ===
Shaw joined Styx in December 1975. His first album with Styx, Crystal Ball (1976), was titled after his own composition and also includes his songs "Mademoiselle" and "Shooz". Its follow-up, The Grand Illusion (1977), became the group's breakthrough album, which went platinum due in part to Shaw; he personally went from studio to studio, coast to coast and pleaded with radio stations to play the band's single "Come Sail Away" (written and sung by Dennis DeYoung), which reached #8 on the Billboard Hot 100 Singles chart. The album also featured the radio hit "Fooling Yourself (The Angry Young Man)", penned by Shaw.

Styx's eighth album, Pieces of Eight, was the breakout album for Shaw's songwriting. His rock-oriented contributions "Renegade" and "Blue Collar Man" were the only major hits from this release, reaching No. 16 and No. 21, and they became 1970s rock-radio staples and perennial Styx concert favorites. The Shaw-sung ballad "Sing for the Day" also became a moderate hit, hitting No. 41, making Shaw the writer and singer of all three singles pulled from the album.

=== 1980s–1990s ===
Though the 1980s eventually brought the decline of Styx, the decade began with the band riding a wave of commercial success with the No. 1 pop ballad "Babe" from their album, Cornerstone (1979), which was written by keyboardist Dennis DeYoung. However, tension mounted within the band as Shaw and other band members, preferring the rock direction of the songs written by Shaw and guitarist James Young, expressed dissatisfaction with DeYoung's desire to pull the band into a pop radio direction. But the planned release of "First Time," another ballad much in the same vein as the previous single "Babe" brought things to a head within the band. Shaw threatened to quit if "First Time" was released, worried that two ballads in a row would alienate Styx's rock fan base. DeYoung and the record company argued for release, but were out-voted by the band. For this reason, unbeknownst to the public, DeYoung was briefly fired from the group in early 1980 but quickly rehired, and the conflict would arise again.

Shaw's dissatisfaction continued to grow as DeYoung took more and more control of the band and their musical direction. Shaw had a lesser role on the theatrically themed album Paradise Theatre, than he had on previous albums with the band, even though it featured a No. 9 hit by Shaw, "Too Much Time on My Hands" – his only Top 10 hit with Styx. Shaw's frustration in the band ultimately boiled over with the next album Kilroy Was Here. The concept of the album, along with its accompanying tour, was entirely the brainchild of DeYoung. The live shows featured an eleven-minute movie intro and theatrical performances with dialogue by the band. Shaw detested the whole project, and this time around vetoed one of his own compositions, "Haven't We Been Here Before" from being released as a single.

From the time Shaw joined Styx, up until the release of "Babe", Shaw had written and sung on six of the band's eight singles released in that period. Shaw released three solo albums in the 1980s: Girls with Guns (1984), What If (1985), and Ambition (1987), scoring a Top 30 hit with the title track and a minor hit with "Lonely School," both from the first album. Shaw's solo band opened concerts for The Kinks in 1984 and for Rush in 1987–88.

=== 1990s–present ===
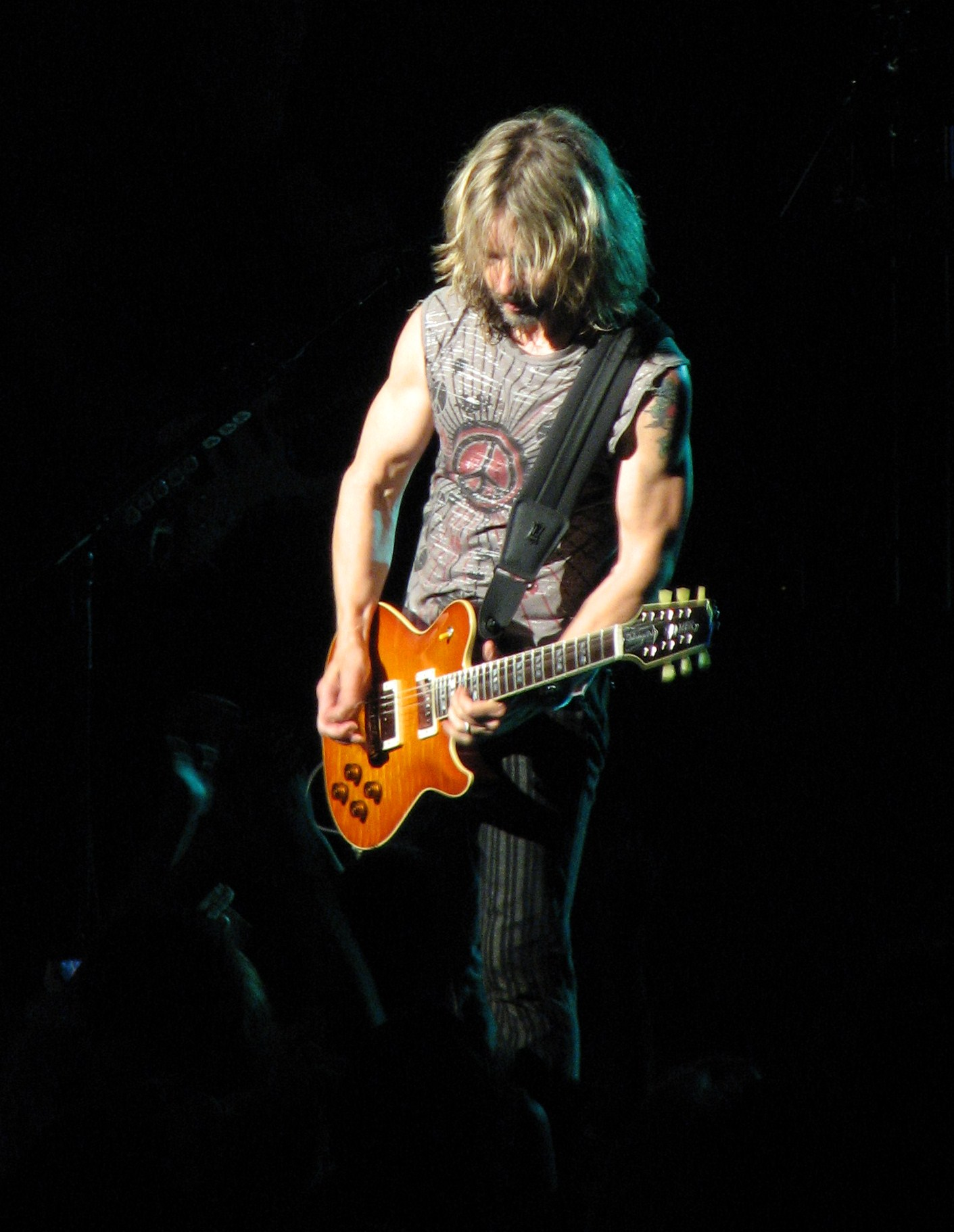
Shaw performing with Styx in 2009 at Interlochen Fine Arts Camp

In the early 1990s, Shaw, Ted Nugent, Jack Blades (of Night Ranger), and drummer Michael Cartellone (Shaw's drummer during his 1988 Ambition tour) formed the band Damn Yankees. Their biggest hit, "High Enough", was co-written by Shaw. The band had a strong concert following, and their first album went platinum, but the band went on hiatus until 2000, when they recorded an album that, because of poor production quality, was never released.

Shaw returned to a reunited Styx in 1995 and embarked on a subsequent tour with them in 1996. Shaw later recorded a fourth solo record in 1998: 7 Deadly Zens. Shaw has also worked with other artists on a Pink Floyd The Wall tribute album titled Back Against the Wall. He also worked on a Kiss tribute album, Spin the Bottle, on which he sang "Love Gun". On the Queen tribute album Stone Cold Queen, Shaw sang the John Deacon-penned "Spread Your Wings".

Shaw joined up again with Jack Blades in a duo called Shaw Blades and released an album entitled Hallucination in 1995. The duo also recorded the classic Christmas song "The Twelve Days of Christmas", which was released in 2002 on the album A Classic Rock Christmas, a compilation of classic Christmas songs recorded by various classic rock artists. A second collaboration entitled Influence was released in early March 2007, and the duo appeared live on VH1 Classic backed up by Nashville songwriter Gary Burr, then did a short tour in spring 2007. Their repertoire included songs from Night Ranger, Styx, Shaw's solo albums, and Damn Yankees. The duo also became a highly sought after songwriting team for such artists as Aerosmith, Ozzy Osbourne, Vince Neil, and Cher.

Shaw currently leads Styx along with James "JY" Young, the only remaining members from Styx's heyday (although original bassist Chuck Panozzo appears as a guest musician for most of their concerts). Upon their reformation in 1996, Styx released the live album Return to Paradise. They went on to record the studio albums Brave New World (which became the last release with co-founder Dennis DeYoung), Cyclorama (with new keyboardist Lawrence Gowan), and Big Bang Theory (an album of cover songs of 1960s and 1970s rock classics). The band continues to tour throughout the US and Europe, often in co-bill shows with REO Speedwagon, Foreigner, Def Leppard, and other classic rock bands.

In early 2007, Shaw Blades went on a small, often sold-out tour to promote Influence. The shows were held in smaller venues throughout the United States. The shows featured remakes of 1960s classics and several top hits from Styx and Night Ranger. At the end of a Styx tour, Shaw Blades added a second tour with new dates through the end of 2007.

On New Year's Eve 2007, Shaw made a guest appearance with the Trans-Siberian Orchestra in Birmingham, Alabama, where they performed such songs as "Blue Collar Man" and "Renegade", as well as TSO originals.

Shaw made his bluegrass debut at the Grand Ole Opry on March 26, 2011, after the March 22 release of his bluegrass album The Great Divide.

In 2011, Shaw worked on Don Felder's Road to Forever album, cowriting and performing on the songs "Wash Away" and "Heal Me".

On June 28, 2018, Shaw, along with his guitarist and musical director Will Evankovich, released an acoustic live album with CYO as Styx played with them in 2006 on the album One with Everything: Styx and the Contemporary Youth Orchestra on which they played his own Styx songs, Damn Yankees, and his solo works. Shaw again performed with the Contemporary Youth Orchestra in 2016 for the concert titled "Sing For the Day". The concert took place at the Waetjen Auditorium on May 27, 2016 and was broadcast on July 9, 2016. It was released on CD & Blu-Ray.

In 2022, Shaw sang lead vocals on "Uroboros," the first release from Alan Parsons' album From the New World.

=== Alabama Music Hall of Fame ===
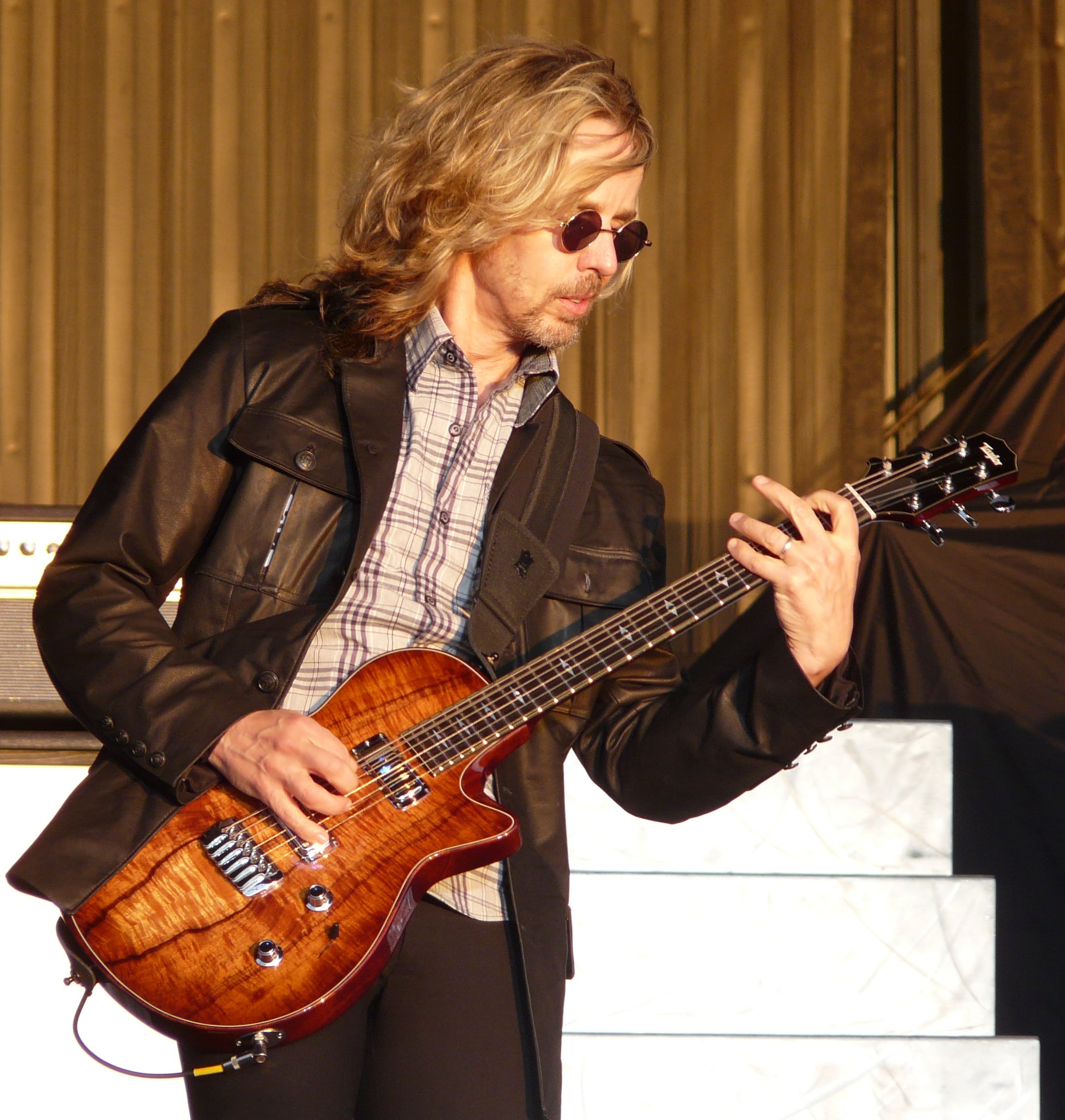
Shaw performing in 2008

Tommy Shaw was inducted into the Alabama Music Hall of Fame on February 22, 2008, at their awards banquet held in Shaw's hometown of Montgomery at the new Montgomery Convention Center, the construction of which was completed just prior to the ceremony.

== Personal life ==
In 1975, Shaw married Cuppy Smith when he was 21 years old in Michigan. Their divorce was finalized in April 1980. Between late 1979 and early 1982, Shaw dated actress Linda Blair. Shaw lived with horse trainer Betsy Waltman on his farm near Niles, Michigan, in the early 1980s. He dated and shared an apartment in Chicago with news anchor Joan Esposito in 1984. Shaw married his second wife, actress Pamela Donnelly, on February 15, 1986. Their daughter, Hannah, was born July 9, 1987. They were divorced December 22, 1993. He married his current wife, Jeanne Mason, on December 28, 2000. Their home was featured on Flipping Out season 5 as Jeff Lewis remodeled it as a rental property.

Shaw stated in a 1992 interview during his first tenure with Damn Yankees that he is a strict vegetarian. Subsequently, on the October 31, 2020, episode of Live from Daryl's House, Shaw regaled Daryl Hall and friends with a story of falling off the vegetarian wagon upon trying a piece of ribeye that widened his eyes.

== Discography ==
=== Solo albums ===
- Girls with Guns (1984)
- What If (1985)
- Ambition (1987)
- 7 Deadly Zens (1998)
- Sweet Emotion (2007)
- The Great Divide (2011)

=== Live albums ===
- Live in Japan (1985)
- Sing for the Day! with Contemporary Youth Orchestra (2017)

=== with Styx ===
- Crystal Ball (1976)
- The Grand Illusion (1977)
- Pieces of Eight (1978)
- Cornerstone (1979)
- Paradise Theatre (1981)
- Kilroy Was Here (1983)
- Brave New World (1999)
- Cyclorama (2003)
- Big Bang Theory (2005)
- The Mission (2017)
- Crash of the Crown (2021)
- Circling from Above (2025)

=== with Damn Yankees ===
- Damn Yankees (1990)
- Don't Tread (1992)

=== with Shaw–Blades ===
- Hallucination (1995)
- Influence (2007)

=== Solo singles ===
Title	Release	Peak chart positions		Album
Title	Release	US	US Main	Album
"Girls with Guns"	1984	33	6	Girls with Guns
"Lonely School"	1984	60	—	Girls with Guns
"Free to Love You"	1984	—	—	Girls with Guns
"Remo's Theme (What If?)"	1985	81	18	What If
"Jealousy"	1986	—	—	What If
"No Such Thing"	1987	—	41	Ambition
"Ever Since the World Began"	1987	75	—	Ambition
"My Hallucination" (Shaw–Blades)	1995	—	26	Hallucination

== Gear ==
Shaw mainly uses Fender and Gibson guitars including:

- Gibson Les Paul
- Gibson SG
- Gibson Explorer
- Gibson ES-335
- Fender Stratocaster
- Taylor SolidBody Standard
- Taylor 914ce

Shaw also plays Hamer guitars, including a Hamer 6/12-string double-neck, from the early to mid-1990s. He was instrumental in the development of Hamer's Duotone guitar. He can be seen playing a Hamer Talladega in the second picture in this article.

For effects he uses:

- Dunlop Cry Baby Wah
- Boss TU-2 Chromatic Tuner
- Boss OD-3 Overdrive
- DigiTech Delay Modeler
