= Gary Loizzo =

American musician (1945–2016)

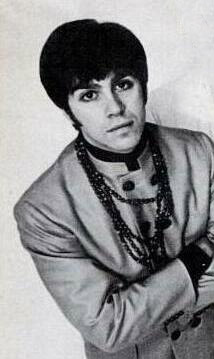

Background information
- Born: Gary Alexander Loizzo; August 16, 1945; Chicago, Illinois, U.S.
- Died: January 16, 2016 (aged 70)
- Genres: Rock, pop
- Occupations: Musician, sound engineer
- Instruments: Vocals, guitar
- Years active: 1961–2016
- Formerly of: The American Breed

Gary Alexander Loizzo (August 16, 1945 – January 16, 2016) was an American guitarist, singer, recording engineer, and record producer. He is best known for being the lead singer with the American Breed.

== The American Breed ==
Gary Loizzo formed a band called Gary & The Knight Lites while he was still in high school in 1961. The band recorded a number of songs before the name was changed to The American Breed in 1967. Loizzo was the lead singer of The American Breed, which had several hit records in 1967–1968, including the #1 million-selling single "Bend Me, Shape Me", and two other top 40 Billboard singles "Green Light" and "Step out of your Mind" and other top 100 hits.

== Recording engineer ==
Loizzo went on to start his own studio business, initially producing demos in his own garage, before creating a recording studio called 'Pumpkin Studios' in 1976. He became a two-time Grammy-nominated recording engineer. He worked with REO Speedwagon, Styx, Bad Company, Slash, Survivor, Liza Minnelli, Tenacious D, Nelson, and many others. Loizzo has been the lead recording engineer for albums that have sold over 50 million copies worldwide.

Gary was inducted into the Illinois Rock and Roll Hall of Fame in 2022 for his Recording Engineering accomplishments and his impact on the Chicago music industry. Kevin Cronin from REO Speedwagon gave the induction speech.

In celebration of the 2005 baseball championship of the Chicago White Sox, the American Breed issued a CD single entitled "Rock with the Sox". The single was produced by Gary Loizzo.

== Death ==
Loizzo died of pancreatic cancer on January 16, 2016, aged 70.

== List of selected projects ==
- 1978 You Can Tune a Piano But You Can't Tuna Fish, REO Speedwagon (engineered), 2× platinum
- 1974 Man of Miracles, Styx (engineered)
- 1979 Cornerstone, Styx (Grammy-nominated for best engineered album of the year), 3× platinum
- 1980 Premonition, Survivor ("Poor Man's Son" – produced and engineered)
- 1981 Paradise Theatre, Styx (engineered), 3× platinum, #1 on Billboard Top 200
- 1983 Kilroy Was Here, Styx (Grammy-nominated for best engineered album of the year), 2× platinum
- 1984 Caught in the Act, Styx (engineered)
- 1985 Desert Moon, Dennis DeYoung (engineered, background vocals)
- 1986 Back to the World, Dennis DeYoung (engineered, background vocals)
- 1988 Boomchild, Dennis DeYoung (engineered, background vocals)
- 1993 Out on a Day Pass, James Young (Assistant Mixer)
- 1994 10 on Broadway, Dennis DeYoung (engineered)
- 1997 Return To Paradise, Styx (engineered), Gold
- 1998 The Hunchback of Notre Dame, Dennis DeYoung (engineered)
- 1998–1999 Mike French Project(Mike French) 13 song CD with Gary Loizzo engineering and singing back up vocals for Mike
- 1999 Brave New World, Styx (engineered)
- 2000 Arch Allies: Live at Riverport, Styx (engineered and co-produced)
- 2000 Mike French and Gary Loizzo co-writes together I Won't Cry for Lisa Library of Congress Washington D.C.
- 2002 At the River's Edge: Live in St. Louis, Styx (engineered and co-produced)
- 2003 21st Century Live, Styx (engineered and co-produced)
- 2005 Cyclorama, Styx (engineered and co-produced)
- 2005 "Rock with the Sox" (White Sox theme), American Breed (engineered, produced, lead vocals)
- 2006 One with Everything: Styx and the Contemporary Youth Orchestra, Styx (engineered and co-produced)
- 2007 Big Bang Theory, Styx (engineered and co-produced)
- 2009 Can't Stop Rockin single and Rock Band download), Styx and REO Speedwagon (engineered and co-produced)
- 2010 Regeneration: Volume I & II, Styx (engineered and co-produced)
- 2013 The Search and the Find, 4th Point (engineered, background vocals)
