= The Music of Styx – Live with Symphony Orchestra =

The Music of Styx - Live with Symphony Orchestra

Live album by Dennis DeYoung
- Released: October 2004
- Recorded: April 4, 2003
- Venue: Chicago Theatre
- Genre: Pop/Rock
- Length: 125:11
- Label: Grand Illusion Music
- Producer: Dennis DeYoung

Dennis DeYoung chronology
Ultimate Collection (1999)	The Music of Styx - Live with Symphony Orchestra (2004)	One Hundred Years from Now (2007)

The Music of Styx - Live with Symphony Orchestra

Video by Dennis DeYoung
- Released: October 2004
- Recorded: Chicago Theatre, Chicago, Illinois, April 4, 2003
- Genre: Pop/Rock
- Label: Grand Illusion Music
- Director: Joe Thomas
- Producer: Randy King

Professional ratings
Review scores
Source	Rating
Classic Rock	4/5 stars

The Music of Styx – Live with Symphony Orchestra is a double CD recording of Dennis DeYoung's live performance of his work both as a solo artist and with the band Styx. The performance was recorded live on April 4, 2003 at the Chicago Theatre in Chicago, Illinois. As indicated by the album title, the songs are symphonically arranged and performed with a live orchestra. Three new studio tracks, "Hello God", "My God (Can Beat Up Your God)", and "Goodnight My Love", appear on the album.

Mike Eldred, who played the part of Quasimodo in DeYoung's musical The Hunchback of Notre Dame is featured as a guest vocalist on the two tracks from DeYoung's score for the musical.

A live DVD of the concert was released at the same time of the album, with a reduced track listing.

== Track listing ==
All songs written by Dennis DeYoung, except as noted:

=== CD 1 ===
1. "The Grand Illusion" - 5:34
2. "Lady" - 4:43
  - Contains interpolation of Boléro, written by Maurice Ravel
3. "Eine Kleine Nachtmusik" (Mozart) / Lorelei (Dennis DeYoung, James Young) - 4:40
4. "Light Up" - 4:52
5. "Intro" - 1:57
6. "Babe" - 4:24
7. "Intro" - 0:53
8. "Show Me the Way" - 2:58
9. "Ave Maria" - 5:17
10. "Castle Walls" - 6:24
11. "Intro" - 0:38
12. "Claire De Lune" (Debussy) - 1:51
13. "Don't Let It End" - 5:00
14. "Hello God" - 4:49

=== CD 2 ===
1. "Mr. Roboto" - 5:23
2. "Rockin' the Paradise" (Dennis DeYoung, Tommy Shaw, James Young) - 4:12
3. "Intro" - 1:00
4. "Black Wall" - 6:38
5. "Desert Moon" - 6:56
6. "With Every Heartbeat" - 5:40
7. "Suite Madame Blue" - 7:52
8. "The Best of Times - 7:41
9. "Intro" - 1:40
10. "Come Sail Away" - 8:06
11. "My God (Can Beat Up Your God)" - 4:52
12. "Goodnight My Love" - 4:31

=== DVD track listing ===
1. "Intro"
2. "Light Up"
3. "The Grand Illusion"
4. "Lady"
5. "The Best of Times"
6. "Ave Maria"
7. "With Every Heartbeat"
8. "Mr. Roboto"
9. "Don't Let It End"
10. "Lorelei"
11. "Babe"
12. "Come Sail Away"
13. "Show Me the Way"
14. "Suite Madame Blue"

== Personnel ==
- Dennis DeYoung: vocals, keyboards, piano
- Mike Eldred: vocals on "Ave Maria" and "With Every Heartbeat"
- Dawn Marie Feusi: vocals on "With Every Heartbeat"
- Tom Dziallo: guitars
- Hank Horton: bass guitar, vocals
- Rick Snyder: keyboards, vocals
- Kyle Woodring: drums, percussion
- Suzanne DeYoung: backing vocals
- Chicago Children's Choir: backing vocals
