= Desert Moon =

Desert Moon may refer to:

- Desert Moon (album), a 1984 album by Dennis DeYoung
  - Desert Moon (Dennis DeYoung song)
- Desert Moon (film), a 2001 Japanese drama film
- Desert Moon (Great White song)
