= Christmas from the Heart =

Christmas from the Heart may refer to:

- Christmas from the Heart (David Archuleta album), a 2009 album
- Christmas from the Heart (Kenny Rogers album), a 1998 album

== See also ==
- Christmas in the Heart, a 2009 album by Bob Dylan
