= Back to the World (Dennis DeYoung album) =

Studio album by Dennis DeYoung
- Released: February 1986
- Recorded: Pumpkin Studios in Oak Lawn, IL
- Genre: Rock, pop rock
- Length: 40:06
- Label: A&M
- Producer: Dennis DeYoung

Dennis DeYoung chronology
Desert Moon (1984)	Back to the World (1986)	Boomchild (1988)

Back to the World is the second solo album by Dennis DeYoung, released in 1986 on A&M Records. The album reached No. 108 on the Billboard 200 chart. The First single, "Call Me" reached #5 on the Adult Contemporary chart and #54 on the Billboard Hot 100; in the Canadian RPM adult contemporary charts, it fared better at #3. "This Is the Time", meanwhile, peaked at No. 93 in the Hot 100, and was included on the soundtrack to the 1986 film Karate Kid II.

== Track listing ==
All songs written by Dennis DeYoung.

Side one

1. "This Is the Time" – 3:57
2. "Warning Shot" – 4:27
3. "Call Me" – 4:49
4. "Unanswered Prayers" – 6:37

Side two

1. "Black Wall" – 5:53
2. "Southbound Ryan" – 4:43
3. "I'll Get Lucky" – 4:43
4. "Person to Person" – 4:57

== Personnel ==
- Dennis DeYoung – vocals, keyboards, percussion
- C.J. Vanston – keyboards, keyboard programming
- Tom Dziallo – all guitars, bass (1–6, 8), drums (2–4)
- Tony Brown – bass (7)
- Wayne Stewart – drums (1, 5–8)
- Vince Gutman – drum programming
- Howard Levy – harmonica
- Steve Eisen – congas, saxophones, flute solo
- Marc Colby – saxophone solos (3, 4)
- Bruce Otto – trombone
- Ron Friedman – trumpet
- Marc Ohlsen – trumpet
- Sandy Caulfield – backing vocals
- Tere Davenport – backing vocals
- Dawn Feusi – backing vocals
- Thom Griffin – backing vocals
- Pat Hurley Rans – backing vocals
- Gary Loizzo – backing vocals
- Tony Ransom – backing vocals

=== Production ===
- Dennis DeYoung – producer, mixing
- Gary Loizzo – engineer, mixing
- Jim Popko – second engineer, mixing
- Tom Dziallo – mixing
- Ted Jensen – mastering at Sterling Sound (New York, NY)
- George Leemon – keyboard technician, Keeper of the Books
- Chuck Beeson – design
- Victoria Pearson – photography
- Danny Goldberg – management
- Burt Stein – management
