= She Rides Wild Horses =

Studio album by Kenny Rogers
- Released: May 11, 1999
- Studios: Creative Recording (Berry Hill, Tennessee); New Reflections, Quad Studios and Seventeen Grand Recording (Nashville, Tennessee); Chaton Studios (Phoenix, Arizona)
- Genre: Country
- Length: 38:06
- Label: Dreamcatcher
- Producers: Kenny Rogers; Brent Maher; Jim McKell

Kenny Rogers chronology
Christmas from the Heart (1998)	She Rides Wild Horses (1999)	There You Go Again (2000)

Singles from She Rides Wild Horses
- 1. "The Greatest" Released: April 17, 1999; 2. "Slow Dance More" Released: 1999; 3. "Buy Me a Rose" Released: October 13, 1999

She Rides Wild Horses is the twenty-third studio album by American country music singer Kenny Rogers. It was released in 1999 on his own Dreamcatcher Records label. The album includes the singles "The Greatest," "Slow Dance More" and "Buy Me a Rose," which all charted on the Billboard country singles charts, giving Rogers' best success on that chart since 1991.

== Singles ==
"The Greatest," his first release on his own label, brought him to the country charts for the first time in nearly eight years, spending twenty weeks on the Hot Country Singles & Tracks (now Hot Country Songs) charts and peaking at 26.

"Slow Dance More" was the album's second single released, peaking at number 67 on the same chart, followed by "Buy Me a Rose," with backing vocals from Alison Krauss and Billy Dean which went to number one on the country charts and number 40 on the Billboard Hot 100, giving Rogers his first number one since 1987, and the last number one of his career. The song also made Rogers, who was 61 at the time, the oldest country artist to achieve a number one hit.

== Critical reception ==
Giving it three stars out of five, Stephen Thomas Erlewine of Allmusic considered it a stronger album than Rogers' 1997 album Across My Heart and a return to his 1980s sound, but said that some of the song selection was "uneven."

== Track listing ==
No.	Title	Writer(s)	Length
1.	"Slow Dance More"	Pat Bunch, Doug Johnson	3:04
2.	"Buy Me a Rose" (guest vocals: Alison Krauss and Billy Dean)	Jim Funk, Erik Hickenlooper	3:48
3.	"I Will Remember You"	Seamus Egan, Sarah McLachlan, Dave Merenda	5:04
4.	"Love Don't Live Here Anymore" (guest vocals: Alison Krauss)	Eric Kaz, Linda Thompson	3:47
5.	"She Rides Wild Horses"	Bob Corbin, Ted Hewitt	3:15
6.	"The Kind of Fool Love Makes"	Brenda Lee, Michael McDonald, Dave Powelson	4:12
7.	"Loving Arms"	Tom Jans	3:40
8.	"I Can't Make You Love Me"	Mike Reid, Allen Shamblin	4:17
9.	"Let It Be Me"	Gilbert Bécaud, Pierre Delanoë, Manny Curtis	3:52
10.	"The Greatest"	Don Schlitz	3:09

== Personnel ==
As listed in liner notes.

- Kenny Rogers – lead vocals
- Bobby Ogdin – keyboards
- Steve Mandile – all guitars (1, 2, 4–9), electric guitar (10)
- Steve Gibson – all guitars (3)
- Mark Selby – rhythm guitar (10)
- Biff Watson – acoustic guitar (10)
- Richard Bailey – banjo (1)
- Russ Pahl – steel guitar (1)
- Bruce Bouton – steel guitar (2, 4)
- Steve Glassmeyer – mandolin (10)
- Spencer Campbell – bass
- Eddie Bayers – drums
- Bobby Taylor – English horn (4, 5), oboe (4, 5)
- Jonathan Yudkin – fiddle (1), violin (3)
- The Nashville String Machine – strings (2–9)
- Bergen White – string arrangements and conductor (2–9)
- Carl Gorodetzky – concertmaster (2–9)
- Michael Black – backing vocals (1, 3, 5)
- Thom Flora – backing vocals (1, 10)
- Billy Dean – backing vocals (2)
- Alison Krauss – backing vocals (2, 4)
- Tammy Fry – harmony vocals (3, 5, 9)
- Yvonne Hodges – backing vocals (5)
- Carolyn Dawn Johnson – harmony vocals (6)
- Billy Montana – backing vocals (7)
- Jack Sundrud – backing vocals (7)

== Production ==
- Jim Mazza – executive producer, management
- Kenny Rogers – producer (1–4)
- Brent Maher – producer, recording, mixing
- Jim McKell – producer, recording, mixing
- Jason Breckling – assistant engineer
- Otto D'Agnolo – assistant engineer
- Thomas Johnson – assistant engineer
- Eric Katte – assistant engineer
- Mark Niemiec – assistant engineer
- Gary Paczosa – assistant engineer
- Paul Skaife – assistant engineer
- Jamison Weddle – assistant engineer
- Eric Conn – digital editing
- Frank Green – digital editing
- Carlos Grier – digital editing
- Mills Logan – digital editing
- Denny Purcell – mastering
- Jonathan Russell – mastering assistant
- Georgetown Masters (Nashville, Tennessee) – editing and mastering location
- Jan Greenfield – production coordinator
- P. David Elezear– art direction
- Nick Long – art direction
- Jim "Señor" McGuire – photography
- Ken Kragen – management
- Greg Oswald for William Morris Agency – booking

== Charts ==
=== Weekly charts ===
Chart (1999)	Peak position
Canadian Country Albums (RPM)	8
US Billboard 200	60
US Top Country Albums (Billboard)	6
US Independent Albums (Billboard)	9

=== Year-end charts ===
Chart (1999)	Position
US Top Country Albums (Billboard)	24
