= As God Is My Witness =

God Is My Witness or As God Is My Witness or God as my Witness may refer to:

== Film and TV ==
- Khuda Gawah, film
- As God is my witness, episode of Super Force
- "As God Is My Witness", Mind Games (TV series) season finale directed by Kyle Killen
- Gone with the Wind (film)

== Music ==
- "As God Is My Witness", song by singer Shirley Bassey from The Performance 2009
- "As God Is My Witness", song by band Judas Priest from Invincible Shield 2024
- "As God Is My Witness", song by Kenny Rogers. written Steve Glassmeyer, Warren Hartman from Across My Heart
