= Live by Request (Kenny Rogers album) =

Live album by Kenny Rogers
- Released: October 21, 2003
- Recorded: 2003
- Genre: Country
- Length: 1:13:58
- Label: Dreamcatcher
- Producer: Jim Mazza

Kenny Rogers chronology
There You Go Again (2000)	Live by Request (2003)	Back to the Well (2003)

Live by Request is a live CD released in 2003 by Kenny Rogers. It documents an installment of A&E Network's Live by Request series.

Ray Waddell of Billboard gave the album a positive review, saying that it was "a fitting overview of a sturdy artist and still vibrant career." A review by Michael D. Clark of the Houston Chronicle was less positive, praising the song choices but criticizing the "decision not to omit most of the between-song TV chatter", ultimately rating the album a "C−".

== Track listing ==
1. Welcome – "Islands in the Stream" – 3:08
2. Official Welcome – Request
3. "Daytime Friends" – 2:57
4. Request
5. "She Believes in Me" – 4:16
6. Request
7. "Ruby, Don't Take Your Love to Town" – 2:22
8. Request
9. "Love Will Turn You Around" – 3:09
10. Request
11. "The Greatest" – 2:45
12. Request
13. "Love or Something Like It" – 2:53
14. Request
15. "Through the Years" – 2:06
16. Request
17. "Lucille" – 3:47
18. Request
19. "Don't Fall in Love with a Dreamer" – 3:53
20. Request
21. "Coward of the County" – 2:35
22. Request
23. "Lady" – 3:44
24. Request
25. "Crazy" – 3:24
26. Request
27. "The Gambler" – 3:20
28. Request
29. "You Decorated My Life" – 3:29
30. Closing – Intro to Finale
31. "Slow Dance More" – 2:58

== Charts ==
The album entered the Billboard Top Country Albums chart and peaked at number 68.

Chart (2001)	Peak position
US Billboard Top Country Albums	68
