= Paradise (Styx song) =

Single by Styx

from the album Return to Paradise
- Released: 1997
- Genre: Pop
- Label: CMC
- Songwriter: Dennis DeYoung

Styx singles chronology
"Love at First Sight" (1991)	"Paradise" (1997)	"Everything Is Cool" (1999)

"Paradise" is the only single release from Styx's 1997 live double album Return to Paradise. The song was originally written and recorded by Dennis DeYoung for his musical The Hunchback of Notre Dame. The song was re-recorded by Styx for inclusion as one of three new studio tracks on the live album.

It was released only to radio stations and not commercially, charting at number 27 on the Billboard Adult Contemporary chart. It is, to date, the last Styx song to chart on any Billboard singles chart.

== Personnel ==
- Dennis DeYoung – lead vocals, keyboards
- Tommy Shaw – lead guitar, backing vocals
- James Young – rhythm guitar, backing vocals
- Chuck Panozzo – bass
- Todd Sucherman – drums
