= 10 on Broadway =

Studio album by Dennis DeYoung
- Released: July 5, 1994
- Studio: Chicago Recording Company and River North Recording (Chicago, Illinois); Pumpkin Studios (Orland Park, Illinois); The White Room (Boston, Massachusetts)
- Genre: Pop
- Label: Atlantic
- Producer: Dennis DeYoung

Dennis DeYoung chronology
Boomchild (1988)	10 on Broadway (1994)	The Hunchback of Notre Dame (1996)

10 on Broadway is a studio album of Broadway standards from Dennis DeYoung. It was released in 1994 by Atlantic Records. The idea for the album came in connection with DeYoung's performance as Pontius Pilate in Jesus Christ Superstar as part of the 1992 national tour of the production.

== Track listing ==
No.	Title	Musical	Length
1.	"Someone to Watch Over Me" (George Gershwin, Ira Gershwin)	Crazy for You	4:11
2.	"On the Street Where You Live" (Alan Lerner, Frederick Loewe)	My Fair Lady	3:10
3.	"Someone Else's Story" (Benny Andersson, Björn Ulvaeus, Tim Rice)	Chess	3:35
4.	"Once Upon a Dream" (Frank Wildhorn, Leslie Bricusse)	Jekyll & Hyde	3:28
5.	"Where I Want to Be" (Benny Andersson, Björn Ulvaeus, Tim Rice)	Chess	3:24
6.	"Summertime" (George Gershwin, DuBose Heyward)	Porgy and Bess	4:35
7.	"Pilate's Dream" (Andrew Lloyd Webber, Tim Rice)	Jesus Christ Superstar	3:10
8.	"Memory" (Andrew Lloyd Webber, Trevor Nunn)	Cats	4:24
9.	"Bring Him Home" (Claude Michel Schonberg, Herbert Kretzmer)	Les Misérables	3:16
10.	"It's in Every One of Us" (David Pomeranz)	Time	4:10

== Personnel ==
- Dennis DeYoung – vocals, accordion, arrangements
- Ed Tossing – acoustic piano, arrangements, string arrangements and conductor, BGV arrangements (2, 10)
- Pat Ferreri – acoustic guitars
- Larry Gray – bass
- Steve Rodby – bass
- Mark Walker – percussion
- Mike Smith – saxophones, flutes
- Orbert C. Davis – trumpet
- Renée Baker – concertmaster
- Arnie Roth – concertmaster
- Bob Bowker – backing vocals (2, 10)
- Pat Duke – backing vocals (2, 10)
- Greg Ferguson – backing vocals (2, 10)
- Michael Harvey – backing vocals (2, 10)
- Jeff Morrow – backing vocals (2, 10)
- Josie Christopher – backing vocals (10)
- Carrie Ann DeYoung – backing vocals (10)
- Dawn Feusi – backing vocals (10)
- Sheila Fuller – backing vocals (10)
- Yvonne Gage – backing vocals (10)
- Cathy Richardson – backing vocals (10)
- Johnny Rutledge – backing vocals (10)

=== Production ===
- Dennis DeYoung – producer, mixing
- Gary Loizzo – engineer, mixing
- Ted Jensen – mastering at Sterling Sound (New York, NY)
- Thomas Bricker – art direction
- Katrin Thomas – photography
