= He Will, She Knows =

2000 song performed by Kenny Rogers

Single by Kenny Rogers

from the album There You Go Again
- Released: July 1, 2000
- Genre: Country
- Length: 3:00
- Label: Dreamcatcher
- Songwriters: Frank Rogers, Steve Leslie
- Producer: Kenny Rogers

Kenny Rogers singles chronology
"Buy Me a Rose" (1999)	"He Will, She Knows" (2000)	"There You Go Again" (2001)

"He Will, She Knows" is a song recorded by American country music artist Kenny Rogers. It was released in July 2000 as the first single from the album There You Go Again. The song reached #32 on the Billboard Hot Country Singles & Tracks chart. The song was written by Frank Rogers and Steve Leslie and features harmony vocals from Collin Raye and Diamond Rio.

== Chart performance ==
Chart (2000)	Peak position
Canada Country Singles (RPM)	64 (Note: "My Next Thirty Years" had not yet peaked when RPM ceased publication in November 2000.)
US Hot Country Songs (Billboard)	32
