= Tantrum (American band) =

American rock band

Tantrum was a seven-member rock group that released two albums on Chicago's Ovation Records label. The group comprised three female singers: Pam Bradley, Sandy Caulfield, and Barb Erber, as well as guitarist Ray Sapko, keyboardist Phil Balsano, bass guitarist Bill Syniar, and drummer Vern Wennerstrom.

Their first album, entitled simply Tantrum, was released in 1978, and their second, Rather Be Rockin', was released the following year. Rather Be Rockin' entered the Billboard Magazine Top LPs and Tapes charts (at #200) on December 19, 1980. The record was also listed in the magazine that month as a "National Breakout" in terms of radio play. Tantrum recorded a third and final album, entitled Breaking Away, which was to be released in 1980. The group disbanded first, however, leaving the album unreleased until August 8, 2005, when the English record company "Escape Music" released this album, along with re-releases of the first two, all on a two-CD set.

In a review of a Park West Chicago performance from December 23, 1978, Billboard Magazine wrote that "Tantrum brought its unusual, exhilarating blend of Motown harmonies and razor-sharp rock here in November 28. The Windy-City Septet, which fuses the gospel vocals of the Sweet Inspirations with the driving rock of Heart, filled its 75-minute show-case with songs from a newly released Ovation LP....Keyboardist Phil Basano, guitarist Ray Sapko, and drummer Vern Wennerstrom received rousing applause for their solos.... ".

In an article titled "Tantrum Eyes Road" from March 3, 1979, Billboard Magazine noted that "Ovation Records has launched a tour of its pop/rock act Tantrum with co-sponsorship from radio in several Midwest Markets. Presenters of the act include WMMS-FM Cleveland, WDEK-FM Dekalb, February 14, and WBYG-FM Kankakee, Illinois, February 15. "

== Discography ==
- Tantrum (1978)
- Rather Be Rockin' (1979)
- Breaking Away (2005)

== Members ==
- Pam Bradley – lead and backing vocals
- Sandy Caulfield – lead and backing vocals
- Barb Erber – lead and backing vocals
- Ray Sapko – guitar, vocals
- Phil Balsano – keyboard, vocals
- Bill Syniar – bass guitar, vocals
- Vern Wennerstrom – drums, percussion

== Member biographies ==
- Sandy Caulfield has a Bachelor of Science degree in Music and Theatre from Indiana University. She sang on jingles before and after Tantrum and now does voice-overs. She also sang on Dennis DeYoung's solo album Desert Moon (Dennis DeYoung was keyboardist and lead singer with Styx) and Kenny Rogers's album Christmas from the Heart.
- After Tantrum, Bill Syniar went on to play with Survivor, appearing on their seventh album Too Hot to Sleep (1988) and on Greatest Hits (1993).
- Ray Sapko grew up in Chicago. After Tantrum, he completed his Bachelor of Guitar degree, studying at The American Conservatory of Music, Roosevelt University, Sherwood Conservatory of Music, and Northwestern University. He plays clubs, does session work, and teaches guitar privately.
- Phil Balsano moved to Los Angeles after Tantrum's demise and became a professional songwriter. Later he worked in publishing. He now lives in Naperville, Illinois and plays in a group called 1969. During the Tantrum period his younger sister, Becky Balsano, was the singer for a group called Tazz Rikki.
- Barb Erber, now Barb Markwart, moved to Las Vegas with her husband where she is now retired.
