= The Gift (Kenny Rogers album) =

Studio album by Kenny Rogers
- Released: September 1996
- Studio: Creative Recording (Berry Hill, Tennessee); 21st Street Recording (Purcelville, Virginia)
- Genre: Christmas, country
- Length: 44:29
- Label: Magnatone
- Producer: Brent Maher; Jim McKell

Kenny Rogers chronology
Vote for Love (1996)	The Gift (1996)	Across My Heart (1997)

Rogers' Christmas chronology
Christmas in America (1989)	The Gift (1996)	Christmas from the Heart (1998)

The Gift is the twenty-seventh studio album and a holiday album by country music singer Kenny Rogers. It was released in 1996 via Magnatone Records. The album features a rendition of "Mary, Did You Know?" featuring Wynonna Judd. This version of the song charted at No. 55 on Hot Country Songs in 1997.

== Critical reception ==
Stephen Thomas Erlewine of Allmusic wrote that "it does suffer from uneven material and the occasional indifferent performance. There are enough good moments here to make it worthwhile for hardcore Kenny fans, but not enough to make it of interest to less dedicated listeners."

== Track listing ==
No.	Title	Writer(s)	Length
1.	"Mary, Did You Know?" (featuring Wynonna Judd)	Buddy Greene, Mark Lowry	3:53
2.	"A Soldier's King"	Kenny Horton, John Barlow Jarvis	3:56
3.	"Pretty Little Baby Child" (featuring The Katinas)	Jarvis, Bill Rice, Sharon Rice	3:48
4.	"What a Wonderful Beginning"	Austin Cunningham, Allen Shamblin	3:51
5.	"It's the Messiah"	Don Potter	3:51
6.	"I Trust You"	Skip Ewing, Don Schlitz	2:38
7.	"Sweet Little Jesus Boy" (featuring GLAD)	Robert MacGimsey; arr. and adapt. by Larry Cansler	2:54
8.	"The Chosen One Montage" ("The Chosen One", "Away in a Manger", "O Holy Night", "Silent Night", "The First Noel", "We Three Kings", & "Joy to the World")	Various writers: "The Chosen One" - Rogers, Warren Hartman, Steve Glassmeyer "Away in a Manger" - James R. Murray "O Holy Night" - Adolphe Adam, John Sullivan Dwight "Silent Night" - Franz Xaver Gruber, Joseph Mohr "The First Noel" - John Stainer "We Three Kings" - John Henry Hopkins Jr. "Joy to the World" - Isaac Watts, Lowell Mason Arr. and adapt. by Bergen White and Warren Hartman	15:43
9.	"Til the Season Comes Around Again"	Randy Goodrum, Jarvis	3:55

== Personnel ==
Compiled from The Gift liner notes.

=== Musicians ===
- Kenny Rogers – vocals
- Bobby Ogdin – keyboards (1–4, 6, 9), acoustic piano (5)
- Gene Golden – keyboards (7)
- Steve Glassmeyer – keyboards (8)
- Warren Hartman – keyboards (8), acoustic piano (8), arrangements (8)
- Don Potter – acoustic guitar (1, 2, 4–6)
- Larry Byrom – electric guitar (3, 9)
- Dax Browning – electric guitar (6)
- Billy Panda – acoustic guitar (8)
- Michael Rhodes – bass (1)
- Duncan Mullins – bass (2–6, 9)
- Bob Burns – bass (8)
- Paul Leim – drums (1–4, 8, 9)
- Eddie Bayers – drums (5, 6)
- Farrell Morris – percussion (1–5, 8)
- Bergen White – orchestral arrangements (1, 2, 4, 5, 8, 9), arrangements (8)
- Larry Cansler – arrangements (7)
- The Nashville String Machine – strings (1, 2, 4, 5, 8, 9)
- Cynthia Wyatt – harp (4, 8, 9)
- Bob Mason – cello (6)
- Jim Grosjean – viola (6)
- Carl Gorodetzky – string contractor (1, 2, 4, 5, 8, 9), violin (6)
- Pamela Sixfin – violin (6)
- Tom McAninch – French horn (2, 8, 9)
- Bobby Taylor – oboe (8), French horn (8)
- Jim Horn – bass flute (8), recorder (8)
- Dennis Good – trombone (8)
- Barry Green – trombone (8)
- Chris McDonald – trombone (8)
- Mike Haynes – trumpet (8)
- Don Sheffield – trumpet (8)
- George Tidwell – trumpet (8)
- Wynonna Judd – vocals (1)
- The Katinas – vocals (3)
- Austin Cunningham – backing vocals (4)
- Lona Heid – backing vocals (4, 6)
- Glad – vocals (7)

Choir (Tracks 2, 4, 5 & 8)

- Bergen White – choral arrangements
- Lisa Cochran, Stephanie Hall, Marabeth Jordan, Jana King, Ellen Musik and Lisa Silver — female chorus
- Michael Eldred, James Ferguson, Mark Ivey, Louis Nunley, Guy Penrod and Dennis Wilson — male chorus

Children's choir on "The Chosen One Montage"

- Megan Dockery, Michael Jones and Kelly Stewart

Children's dialogue on "The Chosen One Montage"

- Brandon Conger, Megan Dockery and Sarah Valley

== Production ==
- Brent Maher – producer, recording (1–6, 9), mixing (1–6, 9)
- Jim McKell – producer, recording, (1–6, 9), mix assistant (1–6, 9), mixing (7)
- Kevin Myers – recording (7)
- Frank Green – additional engineer
- Mills Logan – additional engineer
- Paul Skaife – additional engineer, assistant engineer
- Don Cobb – digital editing
- Carlos Grier – digital editing
- Denny Purcell – mastering
- Georgetown Masters (Nashville, Tennessee) – editing and mastering location
- Jan Greenfield – production assistant
- Carden & Cherry, Inc. – art direction
- Matthew Barnes – photography
- Don Mantooth – photograph of Kenny Rogers
- Kenny Rogers – liner notes
- Ken Kragen – management

== Chart performance ==
Chart (1996)	Peak position
US Top Country Albums (Billboard)	10
US Billboard 200	63
US Top Holiday Albums (Billboard)	9
