= Back to the Well =

Studio album by Kenny Rogers
- Released: September 23, 2003
- Studios: Emerald Sound Studios, Moraine Recording, Sound Emporium Studios, Starstruck Studios, The Tracking Room, Sound Stage Studios and The Work Station (Nashville, Tennessee); Sound Kitchen and Blueberry Hill (Franklin, Tennessee)
- Genre: Country
- Length: 44:22 (US release); 45:58 (European release)
- Label: Dreamcatcher #008
- Producers: Joe Chemay; John Guess; Brent Maher; Kenny Rogers; Phil Vassar

Kenny Rogers chronology
Live by Request (2003)	Back to the Well (2003)	42 Ultimate Hits (2004)

Singles from Back to the Well
- 1. "Harder Cards" Released: April 8, 2002; 2. "I'm Missing You" Released: April 21, 2003; 3. "Love Like This" Released: June 2, 2003; 4. "Handprints on the Wall" Released: September 2003

Back to the Well is the twenty-fifth studio album released in 2003 by American country music singer Kenny Rogers. The album includes the singles "Harder Cards," "I'm Missing You" and "Handprints on the Wall," all of which charted on the Hot Country Songs chart between 2002 and 2003. "Harder Cards" peaked at number 47, "I'm Missing You" at 49 and "Handprints on the Wall" at 40. The album itself reached number 52 on the Top Country Albums chart.

== Critical reception ==
Peter Cooper of The Tennessean rated the album 3 out of 4 stars, stating that "[t]his album is well-constructed, the songs are well-chosen, and Rogers still sings with the quiver and husk of his 'Gambler' days."

== Track listing ==
No.	Title	Writer(s)	Length
1.	"Back to the Well"	Rick Bowles, Robert Byrne	3:06
2.	"Listen to the Rain"	Chuck Cannon, Billy Dean	4:35
3.	"727 East Magnolia Avenue"	Steven Dale Jones, Bobby Tomberlin	2:51
4.	"Undercover" (duet with Dolly Parton)	Dolly Parton	2:39
5.	"Prairie Wedding"	Mark Knopfler	4:35
6.	"I'm Missing You"	Billy Kirsch, Steve Wariner	3:12
7.	"It's a Beautiful Life"	Charlie Black, Phil Vassar, Jim Collins	3:14
8.	"Tears in God's Eyes"	Kent Blazy, Skip Ewing, Kim Williams	4:15
9.	"Harder Cards"	Craig Wiseman, Mike Henderson	4:04
10.	"Handprints on the Wall"	Nelson Blanchard, Scott Innes, Claude Parish	4:02
11.	"Owe Them More Than That" (duet with Tim McGraw)	John Guess, Tony Martin, Clessie Lee Morisette, Roger Springer	3:10
12.	"Love Like This"	Candy Cameron, Chip Davis	4:39

=== Track Listing (European release) ===
1. "Back to the Well" - 3:06
2. "Listen to the Rain" - 4:35
3. "727 East Magnolia Avenue" - 2:52
4. "Owe Them More Than That" - 3:11
5. "Prairie Wedding" - 4:35
6. "I'm Missing You" - 3:12
7. "Harder Cards" - 4:03
8. "Tears in God's Eyes" - 4:15
9. "Suitcase Full of Blues" (Alex Harvey, Steve Schuffert) - 3:24
10. "You Have No Idea" (Catt Gravitt, Guy Zabka) - 4:05
11. "Handprints on the Wall" - 4:01
12. "Love Like This" - 4:39

== Personnel ==
- Kenny Rogers – vocals
- Bobby Ogdin – acoustic piano (1, 10, 12), keyboards (2, 8), synthesizers (5, 10), strings (12)
- Steve Nathan – acoustic piano (3), synthesizers (3, 5), keyboards (4)
- John Barlow Jarvis – acoustic piano (6, 9)
- Warren Hartman – synthesizers (6, 9)
- Dwain Rowe – keyboards (7)
- Phil Vassar – acoustic piano (7)
- Bryan Sutton – acoustic guitar (1, 3, 5, 12)
- Tom Bukovac – guitars (2, 8)
- Brent Rowan – electric guitar (3, 5, 6, 9, 12), electric guitar overdub (4)
- Jerry McPherson – electric guitar (4), bouzouki (4)
- Biff Watson – acoustic guitar (4, 6, 9, 11), banjitar (4)
- Mike Durham – guitars (7)
- Brent Mason – guitars (7), electric guitar (11), gut-string guitar (11)
- Jeff Smith – guitars (7)
- Ilya Toshinsky – banjo (1), guitars (2, 8)
- Rob Ickes – dobro (1)
- Glen Duncan – mandolin (1), fiddle (1, 7)
- Bruce Bouton – steel guitar (3, 5, 6, 9, 12), acoustic guitar (10)
- Paul Franklin – steel guitar (11)
- Joe Chemay – bass (1, 3–6, 9–12), backing vocals (4, 5, 7, 9), percussion (7)
- Spencer Campbell – bass (2, 8)
- John Howard – bass (7)
- Paul Leim – drums (1, 3–6, 9–12), percussion (5, 9)
- Eddie Bayers – drums (2, 8)
- Chuck Tilley – drums (7)
- Pat Bergeson – harmonica (1, 5)
- Jonathan Yudkin – fiddle solo (1), fiddle (12)
- Larry Franklin – fiddle (3–6, 9, 11), mandolin (6, 9)
- Kathy Chiavola – backing vocals (1, 12)
- Chip Davis – backing vocals (1, 10, 12)
- Liana Manis – harmony vocals (3), backing vocals (5)
- Dolly Parton – vocals (4)
- Tammy Pierce – backing vocals (4, 9)
- Steve Wariner – backing vocals (6)
- Tim McGraw – vocals (11), backing vocals (11)
- Alison Krauss – vocals (12)

=== Tracks from European release ===
"Suitcase Full of Blues"

- Kenny Rogers – vocals
- Joe Chemay – Wurlitzer electric piano, organ, rhythm guitar, bass, percussion, backing vocals
- Brent Mason – electric guitar
- Biff Watson – acoustic guitar
- Lee Roy Parnell – slide guitar
- Paul Franklin – steel guitar, lap steel guitar
- Larry Franklin – mandolin, fiddle
- Paul Leim – drums
- Jim Chapman – backing vocals

"You Have No Idea"

- Kenny Rogers – vocals
- Bobby Ogdin – acoustic piano, synthesizers
- Joe Chemay – strings
- Brent Rowan – electric guitar
- Bryan Sutton – acoustic guitar
- Glenn Worf – bass
- Paul Leim – drums
- Kathy Chiavola – backing vocals
- Chip Davis – backing vocals

== Production ==
- Jim Mazza – executive producer
- Kenny Rogers – producer (1, 3–7, 9–12), photography
- Joe Chemay – producer (1, 3–7, 9–12)
- John Guess – producer (1, 3–7, 9–12)
- Brett Maher – producer (2, 8)
- Phil Vassar – producer (7)
- Jan Greenfield – production coordinator (2, 8)
- Misti Filipiak – art direction
- Luellyn Latocki – art direction
- Don Bailey – design
- Kelly Junkermann – photography
- Wanda Rogers – photography

Technical

- Benny Quinn – mastering at Masterfonics (Nashville, Tennessee)
- Jim McKell – recording (1, 10, 12)
- John Guess – mixing (1, 3, 5, 6, 9–12), additional recording (1, 10, 12), recording (3, 5, 6, 9, 11), tracking engineer (4)
- Brett Maher – recording (2, 8), mixing (2, 8)
- Scott Kidd – overdub engineer (4), mix assistant (4, 7), recording (7)
- Matt Andrews – recording (7)
- Erick Jaskoviak – recording (7)
- J.C. Monterrosa – second engineer (1, 10, 12)
- Philip Scoggins – recording assistant (2, 8)
- Jeff Sochor – recording assistant (3, 5)
- Rodney Dawson – recording assistant (11)
- Joe Chemay – additional recording (1, 10, 12), mixing (4, 7), recording (7)
- Patrick Murphy – additional recording (1, 3, 5, 6, 9–12), overdub engineer (4), tracking assistant (4), recording assistant (6, 9)

"Suitcase Full of Blues"

- Kenny Rogers – producer
- John Guess – recording, mixing
- Rodney Dawson – recording assistant
- Patrick Murphy – additional recording

"You Have No Idea"

- Kenny Rogers – producer
- Jim McKell – recording
- John Guess – mixing, additional recording
- J.C. Monterrosa – second engineer
- Joe Chemay – additional recording
- Patrick Murphy – additional recording

== Chart performance ==
Chart (2003)	Peak position
Australian (ARIA Charts) Albums	179
US Top Country Albums (Billboard)	52
