= Tom Sharpe (musician) =

American musician

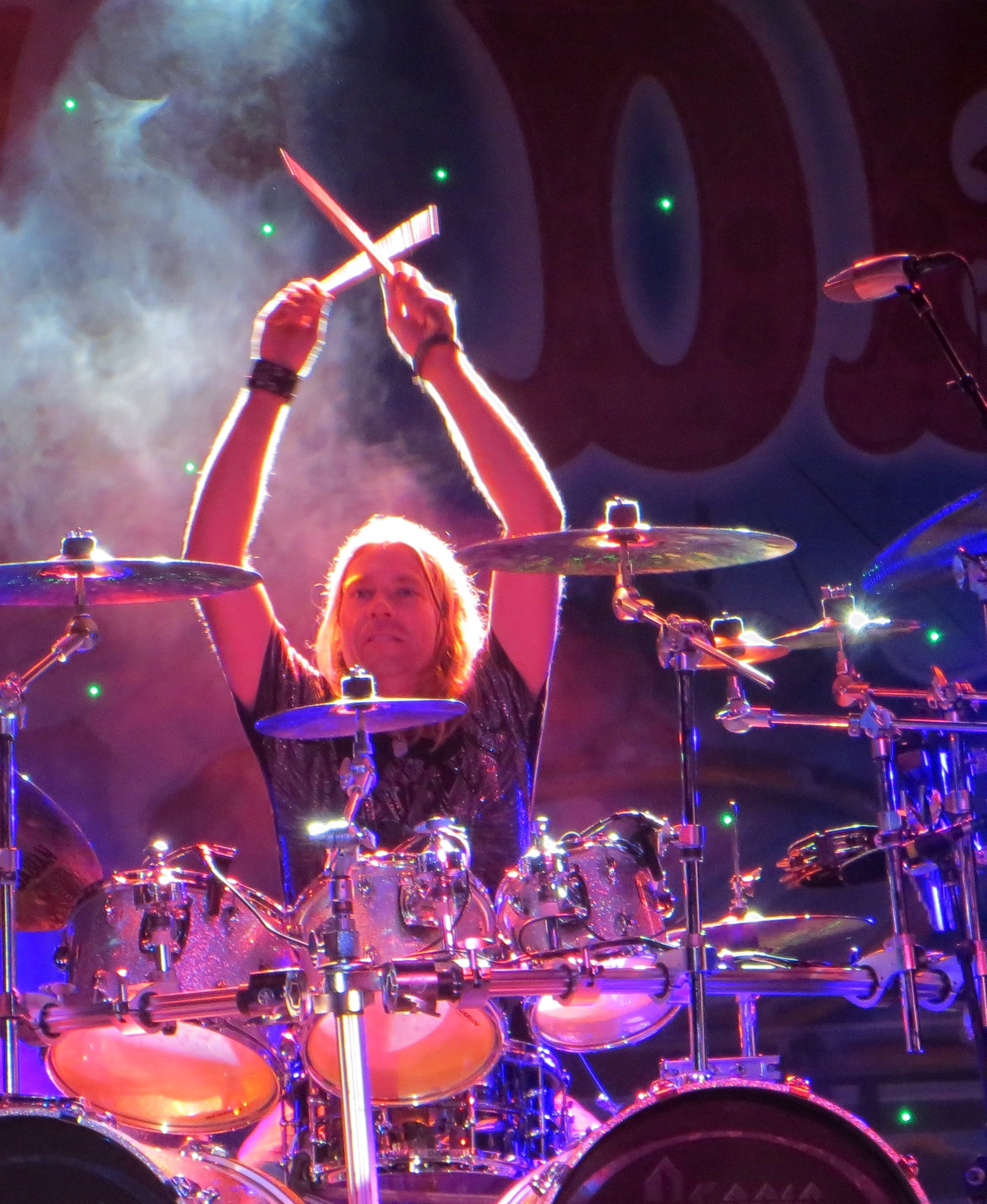
Tom Sharpe in Maumee, Ohio.

Tom Sharpe is an American born musician, composer and recording artist who is principal performer and artistic director of the Sharpe World Music Ensemble. He is best known as one of the drummers for the Grammy award-winning group, Mannheim Steamroller, as well as Dennis DeYoung, a founding member of the rock band Styx.

The title track of his debut CD Like Setting Myself on Fire was voted Grand Prize Winner - World Music Song of the Year by the John Lennon Songwriting Contest.

On October 28, 2014, Sharpe released his second solo CD Lifting the World via Marathon Records.

Sharpe attended the Interlochen Arts Academy and holds the degrees Bachelor of Music and Master of Music from DePaul University in Chicago.

Sharpe lives in Oswego, Illinois, but grew up in Romeo, Michigan.
