= There You Go Again =

Studio album by Kenny Rogers
- Released: 2000
- Recorded: 2000
- Studio: Seventeen Grand Recording, Emerald Sound Studios, Masterlink Studios, Morraine Recording, OmniSound Studios, Quad Studios and La Maison (Nashville, Tennessee); Creative Recording (Berry Hill, Tennessee); Sound Kitchen (Franklin, Tennessee); The Village Recorder (Los Angeles, California)
- Genre: Country
- Length: 41:38
- Label: Dreamcatcher Records
- Producer: Kenny Rogers; Brent Maher; Richard Marx; Jim McKell

Kenny Rogers chronology
She Rides Wild Horses (1999)	There You Go Again (2000)	Live by Request (2002)

Singles from There You Go Again
- 1. "He Will, She Knows" Released: June 26, 2000; 2. "There You Go Again" Released: January 16, 2001; 3. "Homeland" Released: November 5, 2001

Professional ratings
Review scores
Source	Rating
AllMusic	2/5 stars
The Encyclopedia of Popular Music	3/5 stars
USA Today	2/4 stars

There You Go Again is the twenty-fourth studio album by American singer Kenny Rogers, released in 2000. It is his second studio album on his own Dreamcatcher Records label. It produced the singles "There You Go Again", "He Will, She Knows", "Homeland" and "Beautiful (All That You Could Be)".

== Track listing ==
No.	Title	Writer(s)	Length
1.	"There You Go Again"	Tommy Lee James, Jennifer Kimball, Terry McBride	2:45
2.	"He Will, She Knows"	Steve Leslie, Frank Rogers	3:00
3.	"I Wish I Could Say That"	Skip Ewing, James Dean Hicks	3:21
4.	"Homeland"	Keith Miles, Jack Sundrud	4:06
5.	"When We Made Love"	Tom Douglas, Billy Kirsch	3:28
6.	"Until Forever's Gone"	Jeff Carson, Jim Weatherly	4:22
7.	"Crazy Me"	Gary Harrison, Richard Marx	3:59
8.	"Blue Train"	Pat Donahue	3:26
9.	"I Do It for Love"	Harrison, Marx	3:35
10.	"What That Means"	Rex Benson	2:51
11.	"I Won't Forget"	Don Ellis, Billy Montana	3:24
12.	"All That You Could Be"	Rory Bourke, Mike Reid	3:15

== Personnel ==
Musicians

- Kenny Rogers – lead vocals
- Warren Hartman – synthesizers (1, 3, 10, 12)
- Bobby Ogdin – keyboards (1–3, 5, 6), acoustic piano (1, 2, 4, 10, 12), Hammond B3 organ (2, 4, 11), Wurlitzer electric piano (11)
- Gary Smith – keyboards (7, 9)
- Richard Marx – keyboards (9)
- Pat Bergeson – electric guitar (1–3, 5, 6, 8, 10), acoustic guitar (2, 5, 6), harmonica (8)
- Mark Selby – acoustic guitar (1, 3, 4, 11, 12)
- Michael Spriggs – acoustic guitar (2, 10)
- J.T. Corenflos – electric guitar (4, 7, 9, 11, 12)
- Bruce Gaitsch – acoustic guitar (7, 9)
- Mark Casstevens – acoustic guitar (8)
- Steve Wariner – electric guitar (8)
- Duane Eddy – electric guitar (11)
- Dan Dugmore – steel guitar (1–5, 10–12), pedal steel guitar (4)
- Russ Pahl – steel guitar (6)
- Paul Franklin – steel guitar (7, 9)
- Jonathan Yudkin – mandolin (2), violin (10, 12)
- Stuart Duncan – mandolin (4, 11)
- David Hungate – bass guitar (1, 3)
- Glenn Worf – bass guitar (2, 10)
- Spencer Campbell – bass guitar (4, 11, 12)
- Viktor Krauss – bass guitar (5, 6)
- Michael Rhodes – bass guitar (7, 9)
- Larry Paxton – bass guitar (8)
- Shannon Forrest – drums (1, 3, 8)
- Eddie Bayers – drums (4, 7, 9–12)
- Wayne Killius – percussion (1)
- Paul Leim – percussion (2, 5, 6), drums (5, 6)
- Brent Maher – percussion (11)
- Larry Franklin – fiddle (8)
- Kirk "Jelly Roll" Johnson – harmonica (11)

Background vocals

- Suzy Bogguss – backing vocals (1)
- Billy Dean – backing vocals (1)
- Gene Johnson – backing vocals (2)
- Collin Raye – backing vocals (2)
- Marty Roe – backing vocals (2)
- Dana Williams – backing vocals (2)
- Alison Krauss – backing vocals (3)
- John Cowan – backing vocals (4)
- Thom Flora – backing vocals (4, 6)
- Jack Sundrud – backing vocals (4)
- Linda Davis – backing vocals (5, 7)
- Chip Davis – backing vocals (6)
- Tammy Pierce – backing vocals (6)
- Dennis Wilson – backing vocals (6)
- Steve Glassmeyer – backing vocals (7)
- Richard Marx – backing vocals (7, 9)
- Gene Sisk – backing vocals (7)
- Steve Wariner – backing vocals (8)
- Rodney Covington – group vocals (8)
- Everett Drake – group vocals (8)
- Edward Jenkins – group vocals (8)
- Rev. Lawrence Thomison – group vocals (8)
- Brad Paisley – backing vocals (10)

=== Production ===
- Kenny Rogers – producer (1–3, 5, 6, 8, 10)
- Jim McKell – producer (1–6, 8, 10, 12), recording (1–6, 8, 10, 12), mixing (1–8, 10, 11, 12), mastering
- Brent Maher – producer (4, 11, 12), recording (4, 11, 12), mixing (4, 11, 12)
- Richard Marx – producer (7, 9)
- David Cole – recording (7, 9), mixing (9)
- Dave Egan – additional engineer
- Frank Green – additional engineer, mastering
- Mills Logan – additional engineer
- Sylvian Phillipon – additional engineer
- Drew Bollman – assistant engineer
- Jason Breckling – assistant engineer
- Aaron Friedman – assistant engineer
- Bob Horn – assistant engineer
- Mark Lacuesta – assistant engineer
- Melissa Mattey – assistant engineer
- Bobby Morse – assistant engineer
- Chris Scherbak – assistant engineer
- Philip Scoggins – assistant engineer
- Paul Skaife – assistant engineer
- Joshua Wallace – assistant engineer
- Matt Weeks – assistant engineer
- Digital Editing & Mastering (Nashville, Tennessee) – mastering location
- Jan Greenfield – production coordinator (4, 11, 12)
- P. David Eleazar – art direction, design
- Nick Long – art direction, design
- Bernie Boudreau – cover photography
- Peter Nash – interior photography
- Ken Kragen and Jim Mazza at Dreamcatcher Artist Management – management

== Chart performance ==
Chart (2000)	Peak position
U.S. Billboard 200	121
U.S. Billboard Top Country Albums	17
