= Homeland (song) =

2001 song by Kenny Rogers

Single by Kenny Rogers

from the album There You Go Again
- Released: November 3, 2001
- Genre: Country
- Length: 4:06
- Label: Dreamcatcher
- Songwriter(s): Jack Sundrud, Keith Miles
- Producer(s): Brent Maher, Jim McKell

Kenny Rogers singles chronology
"There You Go Again" (2001)	"Homeland" (2001)	"Harder Cards" (2002)

"Homeland" is a song recorded by American country music artist Kenny Rogers. It was released in November 2001 as the third single from the album There You Go Again. The song reached #39 on the Billboard Hot Country Singles & Tracks chart. The song was written by Jack Sundrud and Keith Miles.

== Chart performance ==
Chart (2001)	Peak position
US Hot Country Songs (Billboard)	39
