= The Hunchback of Notre Dame (Dennis DeYoung album) =

Studio album by Dennis DeYoung
- Released: 1996
- Recorded: 1996
- Studios: The White Room, Chicago, Illinois
- Genre: Pop
- Length: 60:00
- Label: Grand Illusion Records
- Producer: Dennis DeYoung

Dennis DeYoung chronology
10 on Broadway (1994)	The Hunchback of Notre Dame (1996)	Ultimate Collection (1999)

The Hunchback of Notre Dame is a 1996 recording of music written by Dennis DeYoung for his musical adaptation of Victor Hugo's 1831 novel The Hunchback of Notre-Dame. The musical was performed at the Tennessee Performing Arts Center in Nashville to some very positive reviews.

This recording was commercially released directly by DeYoung and is an early version of the score, with DeYoung performing all of the male parts and his sister-in-law Dawn Marie performing the female parts.

Several songs are related to Styx and solo DeYoung releases. "Beneath the Moon" is a re-worked version of the song by the same name from DeYoung's 1988 Boomchild album. "Paradise" was later lyrically altered and re-recorded by Styx and released as a studio track on Styx's Return to Paradise double live album. In addition, "While There's Still Time" was likewise re-recorded and included on Styx's Brave New World album.

The album was released the same year as Disney's film version, which DeYoung pointed out in a VH1 interview.

== Track listing ==
All songs written by Dennis DeYoung.

1. "Who Will Love this Child" - 4:22
2. "King of Fools" - 4:37
3. "Hey Quasimodo" - 3:28
4. "By the Grace of God" - 1:53
5. "When I Dance for You" - 3:53
6. "Ave Maria" - 4:32
7. "Alms for the Beggarman" - 4:06
8. "Paradise" - 3:15
9. "Bless Me Father" - 3:14
10. "With Every Heartbeat" - 5:29
11. "Beneath the Moon" - 4:16
12. "While There's Still Time" - 3:59
13. "This I Pray" - 3:40
14. "Esmerelda" - 3:28
15. "The Confrontation" - 3:32
16. "Sanctuary" - 1:37
17. "With Every Heartbeat (Reprise)" - 2:57

== Personnel ==
All music performed and arranged by Dennis DeYoung and Ed Tossing

Lead vocals by Dennis DeYoung and Dawn Marie

Backing vocals by Suzanne DeYoung, Carrie Ann DeYoung, Gary Loizzo, and Forbes Candlish
