= One Hundred Years from Now =

Studio album by Dennis DeYoung
- Released: June, 2007 (Canada); April 14, 2009 (US)
- Recorded: 2006–2008
- Studio: My House Studios (Sanford, Florida); Hinge Studios (Chicago, Illinois); CBC's Studio 211 (Toronto, Ontario, Canada)
- Genre: Rock/Pop, AOR
- Label: Universal Music Canada; Rounder Records (US)
- Producer: Dennis DeYoung

Dennis DeYoung chronology
The Music of Styx - Live with Symphony Orchestra (2003)	One Hundred Years from Now (2007)	26 East, Vol 1 (2020)

Professional ratings
Review scores
Source	Rating
Allmusic	4/5 stars

One Hundred Years from Now is the sixth studio album from American musician Dennis DeYoung.

The album was initially released in Canada in 2007, with the first single being the title track, which is a duet in French and English with Éric Lapointe.

The album was released in the United States on April 14, 2009. The track "Respect Me" was removed and tracks "Private Jones" and "There Was a Time" were added. The title track was replaced with a solo recording in English.

== Canada Track listing (2007) ==
All songs written by Dennis DeYoung, except as noted:

1. "One Hundred Years from Now" (DeYoung, French lyrics by Éric Lapointe) - 5:03
2. "This Time Next Year" - 3:45
3. "Rain" - 4:35
4. "Save Me" - 5:26
5. "Breathe Again" - 5:11
6. "Crossing the Rubicon" - 5:51
7. "Respect Me" - 4:50
8. "I Believe in You" - 4:59
9. "Forgiveness" - 4:22
10. "I Don't Believe in Anything" - 4:08
11. "Turn Off CNN" - 3:05

== US Track listing (2009) ==
All songs written by Dennis DeYoung:

1. "One Hundred Years from Now" - 5:03
2. "This Time Next Year" - 3:45
3. "Rain" - 4:35
4. "Crossing the Rubicon" - 5:51
5. "Save Me" - 5:26
6. "I Don't Believe in Anything" - 4:08
7. "Private Jones" - 4:25
8. "I Believe in You" - 4:59
9. "There Was a Time" - 4:48
10. "Breathe Again" - 5:11
11. "Forgiveness" - 4:22
12. "Turn Off CNN" - 3:05

== Personnel ==
- Dennis DeYoung – vocals, keyboards
- John Blasucci – keyboards (12)
- Tom Dziallo – electric guitars, dobro
- Ernie Denov – electric guitars
- Stéphane Dufour – electric guitars, acoustic guitars
- Jimmy Leahey – electric guitars, acoustic guitars
- John Rice – acoustic guitars
- Hank Horton – bass, backing vocals (12)
- Kyle Woodring – drums (1–3, 5–12)
- Matthew DeYoung – drums (4)
- Éric Lapointe – vocals (1)
- Kevin Chalfant – backing vocals (1–11)
- Suzanne DeYoung – backing vocals on "Respect Me"

=== Production ===
- Dennis DeYoung – producer, engineer, mixing
- Craig Bauer – engineer, mixing
- Phil Bonanno – engineer
- Jeff Breakey – engineer
- Stéphane Dufour – engineer
- Matthew Prock – engineer, mixing
- Ted Jensen – mastering at Sterling Sound (New York, NY)
- Robert Addison – artwork
- Scott Daoust – graphics
- Raf Matthyssen – graphics
- John Welzenbach – photography
- Timothy Orchard – management

== Album Artwork ==
The album artwork is Robert Addison's "Moonlit Merry-Go-Round". The same artist created a piece of art entitled "Paradise Theater", which was used as a model for "The Paradise Theater" album cover.
