= There You Go Again (song) =

Single by Kenny Rogers

from the album There You Go Again
- Released: January 27, 2001
- Recorded: 2000
- Genre: Country
- Length: 2:45
- Label: Dreamcatcher
- Songwriter(s): Terry McBride, Jennifer Kimball, Tommy Lee James
- Producer(s): Kenny Rogers

Kenny Rogers singles chronology
"He Will, She Knows" (2000)	"There You Go Again" (2001)	"Homeland" (2001)

"There You Go Again" is a song recorded by American country music artist Kenny Rogers. It was released in January 2001 as the second single and title track from the album There You Go Again. The song reached #26 on the Billboard Hot Country Singles & Tracks chart. The song was written by Terry McBride, Jennifer Kimball and Tommy Lee James.

== Chart performance ==
Chart (2001)	Peak position
US Hot Country Songs (Billboard)	26
