= Desert Moon (album) =

Studio album by Dennis DeYoung
- Released: September 1984
- Recorded: 1984
- Studio: Pumpkin Studios (Oak Lawn, Illinois)
- Genre: Rock, pop rock
- Length: 38:57
- Label: A&M
- Producer: Dennis DeYoung

Dennis DeYoung chronology
Desert Moon (1984)	Back to the World (1986)

Singles from Desert Moon
- 1. "Desert Moon" Released: September 1984

Music video
- "Desert Moon" on YouTube

Professional ratings
Review scores
Source	Rating
Allmusic	4/5 stars
Kerrang!	(favorable)

Desert Moon is the debut solo album by former Styx keyboard player/singer/songwriter Dennis DeYoung. It was released in 1984 on A&M Records. To date, it has been the most successful of his solo albums and most successful of any of the Styx member solo albums.

The album sold respectably and reached No. 24 on the Billboard 200 album charts in the fall of 1984 and was certified Gold in Canada. The album's biggest hit was its title cut which hit No. 10 on the Billboard singles chart. The album's second single "Don't Wait for Heroes" reached No. 83 and got MTV play. However, the follow-up "Dear Darling (I'll Be There)", failed to chart.

== Track listing ==
All songs written by Dennis DeYoung, except where noted:

Side one

1. "Don't Wait for Heroes" – 4:46
2. "Please" – 4:20 (a duet with Rosemary Butler)
3. "Boys Will Be Boys" – 5:41
4. "Fire" (Jimi Hendrix) – 3:46

Side two

1. "Desert Moon" – 6:09
2. "Suspicious" – 4:57
3. "Gravity" – 4:51
4. "Dear Darling (I'll Be There)" – 4:27

== Personnel ==
- Dennis DeYoung – vocals, backing vocals, keyboards, percussion, arrangements (1–3, 5–8)
- Tom Dziallo – acoustic guitars, electric guitars, bass guitar (2–5, 7, 8), additional drum programming, percussion, arrangements (4)
- Dennis Johnson – bass guitar (1, 6)
- Tom Radtke – drums, percussion
- Vince Gutman – electronic drum programming
- Gary Loizzo – additional drum programming, backing vocals
- Maurice Lynn Simmons – additional drum programming
- Steve Eisen – saxophones, congas (6)
- Rosemary Butler – vocals (2)
- Sandy Caulfield – backing vocals (3)
- Suzanne DeYoung – backing vocals (3)
- Dawn Feusi – backing vocals (3)
- Pat Hurley – backing vocals (3)

=== Production ===
- Dennis DeYoung – producer, mixing
- Rob Kingsland – engineer, mixing
- Gary Loizzo – engineer, mixing
- Jim Popko – second engineer, mixing
- Will Rascati – third engineer, mixing
- Tom Dziallo – mixing
- Ted Jensen – mastering at Sterling Sound (New York, NY)
- George Leemon – keyboard technician, keeper of the books
- Chuck Beeson – art direction, design
- Aaron Rapoport – photography
- Peggie Martin – wardrobe
