= Boomchild =

Studio album by Dennis DeYoung
- Released: February 1989
- Studio: Streeterville Studios (Chicago, Illinois); Pumpkin Studios (Oak Lawn, Illinois); Record Plant (Los Angeles, California)
- Genre: Pop rock
- Length: 37:46
- Label: MCA
- Producer: Dennis DeYoung; Alan Shacklock

Dennis DeYoung chronology
Back to the World (1986)	Boomchild (1989)	10 on Broadway (1994)

Boomchild is the third solo album by American musician Dennis DeYoung. It was released in February 1989 by MCA Records. Boomchild featured the title track with a music video but the song was relegated to the B-Side of "Beneath the Moon", the only single. Both the single and Boomchild failed to chart.

== Track listing ==
All songs written by Dennis DeYoung, except as noted:

Side one

1. "Beneath the Moon" – 4:42
2. "The Best Is Yet to Come" – 4:15
3. "What a Way to Go" – 4:45
4. "Harry's Hands" – 4:52

Side two

1. "Boomchild" – 4:56
2. "Who Shot Daddy?" – 4:33
3. "Outside Looking In Again" – 5:23
4. "Won't Go Wasted" (DeYoung, Rob Friedman) – 4:20

== Personnel ==
- Dennis DeYoung – vocals, backing vocals (1–5, 8), acoustic piano (1, 5, 7, 8), synthesizers (1, 6, 8), keyboards (2–5, 7), synth bass (2, 6), organ (6), horn arrangements (6)
- Vaughn Haylord – Synclavier programming
- Brian Poer – Synclavier programming
- C.J. Vanston – synthesizers (1, 6, 8), acoustic piano (3), keyboards (3, 5), synth bass (3, 5), bass (8)
- Chris Cameron – synthesizers (6), horn arrangements (6)
- Alan Shacklock – E-mu Emulator horns (8)
- John Adair – guitars (1), acoustic guitar (1)
- Tom Dziallo – guitars (1–7)
- Bill Ruppert – guitars (1, 3, 7, 8)
- Bob Lizik – bass guitar (1, 3–5, 7)
- John Robinson – drums (1–5, 7, 8)
- Wayne Stewart – drums (6)
- Joe Pusateri – percussion (1–5, 7, 8)
- Howard Levy – harmonica (2, 6)
- Mike Smith – baritone saxophone (6)
- Steve Eisen – tenor saxophone (6)
- Mike Halperin – trombone (6)
- Orbert C. Davis – trumpet (6)
- Mark Ohlson – trumpet (6)
- Gary Pigg – backing vocals (1)
- Mark Williamson – backing vocals (1–5, 8)
- Jeff Morrow – backing vocals (2–5, 8)
- The 101st Place Singers – backing vocals (3, 5)
- Bill Champlin – backing vocals (4)
- Tamara Champlin – backing vocals (4)
- Dawn Feusi – backing vocals (4)
- Gary Loizzo – backing vocals (5)
- Sean Christopher – backing vocals (6), harmony vocals (6)
- Cynthia Harrell – backing vocals (6)
- Francine Smith – backing vocals (6)

=== Production ===
- Dennis DeYoung – producer, mixing
- Alan Shacklock – producer (1–3, 5–8)
- Justin Niebank – engineer, mixing (4)
- Gary Loizzo – mixing (1–3, 5–8)
- David Axelbaum – assistant engineer, mix assistant (4)
- Milan Bertoza – mix assistant (1–3, 5–8)
- Brian Peor – assistant engineer
- Ted Jensen – mastering at Sterling Sound (New York, NY)
- Jeff Adamoff – art direction
- Bob Hickson – artwork
- Dennis Keeley – photography
- Trudy Green – management
