= Return to Paradise (Styx album) =

Live album by Styx
- Released: May 6, 1997
- Recorded: September 21, 1996
- Venues: Rosemont Horizon, Rosemont, Illinois
- Genre: Rock
- Length: 1:50:10
- Label: CMC International
- Producer: Dennis DeYoung

Styx chronology
Edge of the Century (1990)	Return to Paradise (1997)	Brave New World (1999)

Return to Paradise is the second live album by the American rock band Styx, released in 1997, and their first album after signing with CMC International. It features songs from their successful reunion tour with Tommy Shaw, but without John Panozzo, who died in July 1996. It includes three new studio tracks, "On My Way," "Paradise," and "Dear John." Shaw wrote the latter as a tribute to Panozzo, while "Paradise" featured upon Dennis DeYoung's solo album and was newly recorded with the band.

Professional ratings
Review scores
Source	Rating
AllMusic	4/5 stars
The Daily Vault	A−
The Rolling Stone Album Guide	1/5 stars

== Track listing ==
Disc one

1. "On My Way" [*] (Tommy Shaw) – 5:02
2. "Paradise" [*] (Dennis DeYoung) – 4:29
3. "A.D. 1928" / "Rockin' the Paradise" (DeYoung, James Young, Shaw) – 5:23
4. "Blue Collar Man" (Shaw) – 4:34
5. "Lady" (DeYoung) – 3:28
6. "Too Much Time on My Hands" (Shaw) – 5:43
7. "Snowblind" (Young, DeYoung) – 5:26
8. "Suite Madame Blue" (DeYoung) – 8:31
9. "Crystal Ball" (Shaw) – 5:56

Disc two

1. "The Grand Illusion" (DeYoung) – 6:50
2. "Fooling Yourself (The Angry Young Man)" (Shaw) – 5:54
3. "Show Me the Way" (DeYoung) – 5:11
4. "Boat on the River" (Shaw) – 3:16
5. "Lorelei" (DeYoung, Young) – 4:03
6. "Babe" (DeYoung) – 4:50
7. "Miss America" (Young) – 6:15
8. "Come Sail Away" (DeYoung) – 8:33
9. "Renegade" (Shaw) – 6:01
10. "The Best of Times/A.D. 1958" (DeYoung) – 7:42
11. "Dear John" [*] (Shaw) – 3:03

* Newly recorded studio tracks

== Personnel ==
=== Styx ===
- Dennis DeYoung – vocals, keyboards, accordion
- Tommy Shaw – vocals, guitars, mandolin
- James "JY" Young – vocals, guitars, keyboards
- Chuck Panozzo – bass, vocals
- Todd Sucherman – drums

=== Production ===
- Producer: Dennis DeYoung
- Engineer: Timothy R. Powell
- Mixing: Dennis DeYoung, Gary Loizzo
- Art direction: Ioannis, Linda Loiewski
- Design: Ioannis
- Illustrations: Ioannis
- Digital painting: Ioannis
- Photography: Mark Weiss

== Charts ==
Chart (1997)	Peak position
US Billboard 200	139

== Certifications ==
Region	Certification	Certified units/sales
United States (RIAA) DVD release	Gold	50,000^{^}
^{^} Shipments figures based on certification alone.
