= Christmas from the Heart (Kenny Rogers album) =

Christmas From The Heart

Studio album by Kenny Rogers
- Released: October 1998
- Recorded: 1998
- Studios: Creative Recording and Quad Studios (Nashville, Tennessee)
- Genre: Christmas
- Length: 52:06
- Label: Dreamcatcher
- Producers: Brent Maher; Warren Hartman

Kenny Rogers chronology
Across My Heart (1997)	Christmas From The Heart (1998)	She Rides Wild Horses (1999)

Rogers' Christmas chronology
The Gift (1996)	Christmas From The Heart (1998)	Once Again It's Christmas (2015)

Professional ratings
Review scores
Source	Rating
Allmusic	2/5 stars

Christmas From The Heart is a 1998 holiday album by country music superstar Kenny Rogers.

== Overview ==
Allmusic panned the album, saying: "This is truly a bizarre and disappointing album, combining Rogers' bland adult contemporary versions of traditional Christmas songs with obnoxious numbers sung by children."

== Track listing ==
No.	Title	Writer(s)	Length
1.	"It's Just Not Christmas"	Sandin, Smith-Cochran	3:09
2.	"The Christmas Song"	Torme, Wells	2:49
3.	"My Favorite Things"	Hammerstein, Rodgers	2:42
4.	"White Christmas"	Berlin	2:57
5.	"Let It Snow!"	Cahn, Styne	2:07
6.	"O Come All Ye Faithful"	Oakeley, Wade	3:16
7.	"Hey Little Christmas Tree"	Golden, Hartman, Rogers	3:04
8.	"Merry Christmas"	Golden, Hartman, Rogers	1:44
9.	"Money Isn't What Really Matters"	Golden, Hartman, Rogers	2:30
10.	"Heroes"	Golden, Hartman, Rogers	2:20
11.	"I Wanna Be a Christmas Present"	Golden, Hartman, Rogers	2:20
12.	"The Ballerina Song"	Golden, Hartman, Rogers	3:50
13.	"Help Somebody Find Their Way"	Golden, Hartman, Rogers	2:20
14.	"If I Only Had Your Heart" (duet with Alyssa Bonagura)	Golden, Hartman, Rogers	3:50
15.	"Mister Perfect"	Golden, Hartman, Rogers	2:35
16.	"I Promise You"	Golden, Hartman, Rogers	3:30
17.	"The Toy Shoppe"	Golden, Hartman, Rogers	3:10
18.	"'Til the Season Comes 'Round Again"	Goodrum, Jarvis	3:53

== Personnel ==
Musicians

- Kenny Rogers – lead vocals, arrangements
- Steve Glassmeyer – acoustic piano, Hammond organ, organ, synthesizers, backing vocals
- Bobby Ogdin – keyboards
- Gene Sisk – acoustic piano, electric piano, synthesizers, backing vocals
- Warren Hartman – sequencing, arrangements
- Larry Byrom – electric guitar
- Randy Dorman – acoustic guitar, electric guitar, arrangements
- Rick Harper – acoustic guitar, electric guitar
- Steve Mandile – electric guitar
- Spencer Campbell – bass
- Chuck Jacobs – bass
- Duncan Mullins – bass
- Eddie Bayers – drums
- Lynn Hammann – drums
- Paul Leim – drums
- Farrell Morris – percussion
- Jim Horn – alto saxophone, baritone saxophone, tenor sax solo, recorder
- Denis Solee – alto saxophone, soprano sax solo, flute, piccolo
- Matt Glassmeyer – tenor saxophone
- Dennis Good – trombone
- Barry Green – trombone
- Chris McDonald – trombone
- Mike Haynes – trumpet
- Don Sheffield – trumpet
- George Tidwell – trumpet
- Tom McAninch – French horn
- Pat Bergeson – harmonica
- Cynthia Wyatt – harp
- The Nashville String Machine – strings
- Carl Gorodetzky – concertmaster
- Bergen White – string orchestration and conductor, horn orchestration
- Gene Golden – arrangements, horn arrangements
- Tammy Pierce – backing vocals
- Evan Broder – vocals
- Alyssa Bonagura – vocals (14)

Choir

- Darryl Appleton, Stacey Campbell, Rodney Covington (director), Anthony Davis, Pamela Holman, Robin Johnson-Neal, Shonte Johnson, Antonio Jones, Karima Kibble, Gale Mayes, Ann McCray, Larry Neal, Gavin Sesley, Denotra Sharpe, Demetria Slayden and Wanda Watkins

Cast vocals

- Alyssa Bonagura, Lisa Cochran, Sandy Caufield, Steve Glassmeyer, Scott Hogue, Marabeth Jordan, Liza Martine, Michele Rodgers-McGrath, Kenny Rogers, Dennis Scott, Gene Sisk, Scat Springs and Bergen White

Children's vocals

- Dennis Scott – vocal conductor
- Gracie Glassmeyer, Brandon Hargest, Brittany Hargest, Ashley Milling and Jamie Murrah – vocals

== Production ==
- Jim Mazza – executive producer, management for Dreamcatcher Management
- Warren Hartman – producer
- Brent Maher – producer, recording, mixing
- Paul Skaife – recording, mix assistant
- Frank Farrell – MIDI consultant
- Don Cobb – digital editing
- Carlos Grier – digital editing
- Denny Purcell – mastering
- Georgetown Masters (Nashville, Tennessee) – editing and mastering location
- Jan Greenfield – production assistant
- P. David Eleazar – art direction, design
- Nick Long – art direction, design
- Chris Callis – photography
- Linda Fennimore – snow globe illustration

== Reissue ==
In 2008, Koch Records reissued the CD under the same title, but with one change; the final track is omitted.
