= The Greatest (Kenny Rogers song) =

Single by Kenny Rogers

from the album She Rides Wild Horses
- Released: April 17, 1999
- Genre: Country
- Length: 3:09
- Label: Dreamcatcher
- Songwriter: Don Schlitz
- Producers: Brent Maher, Jim McKell

Kenny Rogers singles chronology
| "I'll Be There for You" (1992) | "The Greatest" (1999) | "Slow Dance More" (1999) |

"The Greatest" is a song written by Don Schlitz, and recorded by American country music artist Kenny Rogers. It was released in April 1999 as the first single from the album She Rides Wild Horses. The song reached No. 26 on the Billboard Hot Country Singles & Tracks chart.

== Content ==
In the song, a little boy is outside playing baseball by himself, saying, "I'm the greatest player," and tosses the ball up in the air to hit the ball and swings and misses. The boy repeats this two more times. As his mother calls him inside for supper, the undeterred boy, in a twist ending, reveals his position—pitcher—and thus by earning a strikeout, he is still the greatest. In another twist, the young boy in the song's video is Eli Bishop who grew up to be a fiddle player in the Grand Ole Opry Band. When songwriter Don Schlitz performs the song on the Opry, he frequently introduces Eli to the audience.

== Chart performance ==
| Chart (1999) | Peak position |
|---|---|
| Canada Country Singles (RPM) | 10 |
| US Hot Country Songs (Billboard) | 26 |

=== Year-end charts ===
| Chart (1999) | Position |
|---|---|
| Canada Country Tracks (RPM) | 97 |
