= Brave New World (Styx album) =

Studio album by Styx
- Released: June 29, 1999
- Recorded: 1998
- Studios: Pumpkin Studios, Chicago, The S.H.O.P., Hollywood, CA, The White Room, Chicago
- Genres: Hard rock; pop rock
- Length: 59:52
- Label: CMC International
- Producers: Dennis DeYoung; Tommy Shaw; James Young

Styx chronology
Return to Paradise (1997)	Brave New World (1999)	Cyclorama (2003)

Singles from Brave New World
- 1. "Everything Is Cool" Released: 1999

Professional ratings
Review scores
Source	Rating
AllMusic	2/5 stars
The Daily Vault	D+
Q	3/5 stars
The Rolling Stone Album Guide	1/5 stars

Brave New World is the thirteenth studio album by the American rock band Styx, released in 1999. It is the band's first studio album to feature drummer Todd Sucherman, replacing John Panozzo, who died in 1996, and the last album to feature keyboardist/vocalist Dennis DeYoung. The album peaked at #175 on the Billboard 200 and reached the top 10 on the Top Internet Albums chart. However, its position on the Billboard charts was the lowest from a Styx album of new material since 1973's The Serpent Is Rising.

Jerry Goodman, who is featured on violin as a special guest, used to play with bands like The Flock and Mahavishnu Orchestra. The album has a strong science fiction theme, as indicated by the album's title and song references to the well-known eponymous book.

== Track listing ==
No.	Title	Writer(s)	Lead vocals/Lead guitar	Length
1.	"I Will Be Your Witness"	Tommy Shaw, Jack Blades	Shaw	4:31
2.	"Brave New World"	Shaw, James Young	Shaw	5:14
3.	"While There's Still Time"	Dennis DeYoung	DeYoung	3:53
4.	"Number One"	Shaw	Shaw	4:33
5.	"Best New Face"	Shaw, Blades	Shaw	3:36
6.	"What Have They Done to You"	Shaw, Young	Young, Shaw	4:33
7.	"Fallen Angel"	DeYoung	DeYoung	4:49
8.	"Everything Is Cool"	Shaw	Shaw	5:19
9.	"Great Expectations"	DeYoung	DeYoung	4:44
10.	"Heavy Water"	Shaw, Young	Young, Shaw	4:29
11.	"High Crimes & Misdemeanors (Hip Hop-Cracy)"	DeYoung	DeYoung	3:26
12.	"Just Fell In"	Shaw, Young	Shaw	3:25
13.	"Goodbye Roseland"	DeYoung	DeYoung	3:49
14.	"Brave New World" (Reprise)	Shaw, Young	Shaw	3:31

== Personnel ==
=== Styx ===
- Dennis DeYoung – vocals, keyboards
- Tommy Shaw – guitars, mandolin, keyboards, vocals
- James "JY" Young – guitars, vocals
- Chuck Panozzo – bass
- Todd Sucherman – drums, percussion

=== Additional personnel ===
- Jerry Goodman – violin
- David Campbell – string arrangements, conductor
- Ed Tossing – string arrangements, conductor
- C. J. Vanston – horn arrangements, conductor

=== Production ===
- Producers: Dennis DeYoung, Tommy Shaw, James Young
- Engineers: Rodney Amos, Craig Bauer, Andy Haller, John Hendrickson, Steve Johnson, Gary Loizzo, Keith Marks, Tommy Shaw, C.J. Vanston, Craig Williams
- Mixing: Craig Bauer, Dennis DeYoung, Gary Loizzo, Ron Nevison
- Mastering: Ted Jensen
- Sequencing: Tommy Shaw
- Programming: Tommy Shaw
- Pro-Tools: Patrick Thrasher
- Art direction: Alan Chappell, Ioannis
- Design: Alan Chappell, Ioannis
- Artwork: Ioannis

== Charts ==
Chart (1999)	Peak position
US Billboard 200	175
