= Across My Heart =

Studio album by Kenny Rogers
- Released: July 1997
- Recorded: 1997
- Studio: Creative Recording, Moraine Recording and The Work Station (Nashville, Tennessee); Bravo Studios (Los Angeles, California)
- Genre: Country
- Length: 38:48
- Label: Magnatone Records
- Producer: Brent Maher

Kenny Rogers chronology
The Gift (1996)	Across My Heart (1997)	Christmas from the Heart (1998)

Across My Heart is the twenty-second studio album by country artist Kenny Rogers released in 1997 by Magnatone Records. It features a wide array of artists collaborating with Rogers on various songs on the album like All-4-One, The Katinas, Tareva Henderson and Bekka & Billy. The album hit the charts, with its strongest showing on the country charts at number 26, although it did not produce any hit singles.

== Critical reception ==
Allmusic's Stephen Thomas Erlewine rated it 2.5 out of 5 stars, saying that " Even with all these collaborators, the album sounds homogenous, especially since the material is entirely generic. However, it holds together better than most Rogers albums since the mid-'80s, because it is evident that some thought and care went into its production."

== Track listing ==
No.	Title	Writer(s)	Length
1.	"To Me"	Mack David, Mike Reid	3:16
2.	"Write Your Name (Across My Heart)"	Tony Harrell, Randy VanWarmer	3:33
3.	"The Only Way I Know"	Gary Burr, Mike Reid	4:01
4.	"Have a Little Faith in Me"	John Hiatt	3:59
5.	"Sing Me Your Love Song"	Jonathan Butler, Labi Siffre	4:17
6.	"As God Is My Witness"	Steve Glassmeyer, Warren Hartman, Kenny Rogers	3:38
7.	"You're Not Asking Much"	Eric Kaz, Ellen Shipley	4:27
8.	"Only Once in a Lifetime"	Keith Diamond, Michael Garvin, Anthony L. Smith	3:28
9.	"Find a Little Grace"	Jim Weatherly, Bob Welch	4:40
10.	"See Me Through"	Terry Sampson	3:29

== Personnel ==
- Kenny Rogers – vocals
- Steve Glassmeyer – keyboards, Hammond B3 organ, backing vocals
- Warren Hartman – keyboards
- Randy McCormick – acoustic piano, keyboards, Hammond B3 organ
- Bobby Ogdin – acoustic piano, electric piano, keyboards, Hammond B3 organ
- Gene Sisk – keyboards, backing vocals
- Jerry Kimbrough – acoustic guitars, electric guitars
- Brent Rowan – acoustic guitars, electric guitars
- Biff Watson – acoustic guitars, electric guitars
- Duncan Mullins – bass guitar
- Willie Weeks – bass guitar
- Eddie Bayers – drums
- Paul Leim – drums, congas, percussion, tambourine
- Tom Roady – percussion
- Jim Horn – soprano saxophone
- Bob Bailey – backing vocals
- Damita Chavis-Haynes – backing vocals
- Paula Chavis – backing vocals
- Kim Fleming – backing vocals
- Vicki Hampton – backing vocals
- Jana King Evans – backing vocals
- Cindy Walker – backing vocals
- Bergen White – backing vocals, vocal arrangements

Guest vocalists

- Kim Carnes (1, 3)
- All-4-One (2)
- Michael McDonald (3)
- The Katinas (7)
- Tareva Henderson (8)
- Bekka Bramlett (9)
- Billy Burnette (9)

== Production ==
- Jim Mazza – executive producer
- Brent Maher – producer, recording, mixing
- Mills Logan – recording, mix assistant
- Paul Skaife – recording assistant
- Tim O'Brien – BGV recording and mixing (2)
- Victor Flores – BGV recording and mixing (2)
- Marty Williams – BGV recording (9)
- Don Cobb – digital editing
- Carlos Grier – digital editing
- Denny Purcell – mastering
- Georgetown Masters (Nashville, Tennessee) – editing and mastering location
- Jan Greenfield – production assistant
- Glenn Sweitzer – art direction
- Randee St. Nicholas – photography
- Ken Kragen – management
- Brian Kagan – marketing consultant
- C.K. Spurlock – booking

== Chart performance ==
Chart performance for Across My Heart
Chart (1997–1998)	Peak position
Australian Albums (ARIA)	89
US Billboard 200	193
US Top Country Albums (Billboard)	26
