= Desert Moon (Dennis DeYoung song) =

Single by Dennis DeYoung

from the album Desert Moon
- B-side: "Gravity"
- Released: August 1984
- Recorded: 1984
- Studio: Pumpkin Studios (Oak Lawn, Illinois)
- Genre: Pop rock; soft rock
- Length: 6:09
- Label: A&M
- Songwriter: Dennis DeYoung
- Producer: Dennis DeYoung

Dennis DeYoung singles chronology
"Desert Moon" (1984)	"Don't Wait for Heroes" (1984)

"Desert Moon" is a song written and performed by Dennis DeYoung, a founding member of Styx, from his debut solo album of the same name in 1984. The song was originally intended to be a Styx song until the band broke up. The single reached the #10 position in the US Billboard Hot 100 during the fall of that year, and ended up at #97 on the Billboard top 100 hits for the year 1984.

The music video for the song, directed by Jack Cole, was filmed partly at the train depot and other historic buildings in and around Santa Paula, California.

== Chart performance ==
Chart (1984)	Peak position
US Billboard Hot 100	10
Canadian RPM Top Singles	7
Irish Singles Chart	8
