= Dennis DeYoung =

American rock musician (born 1947)

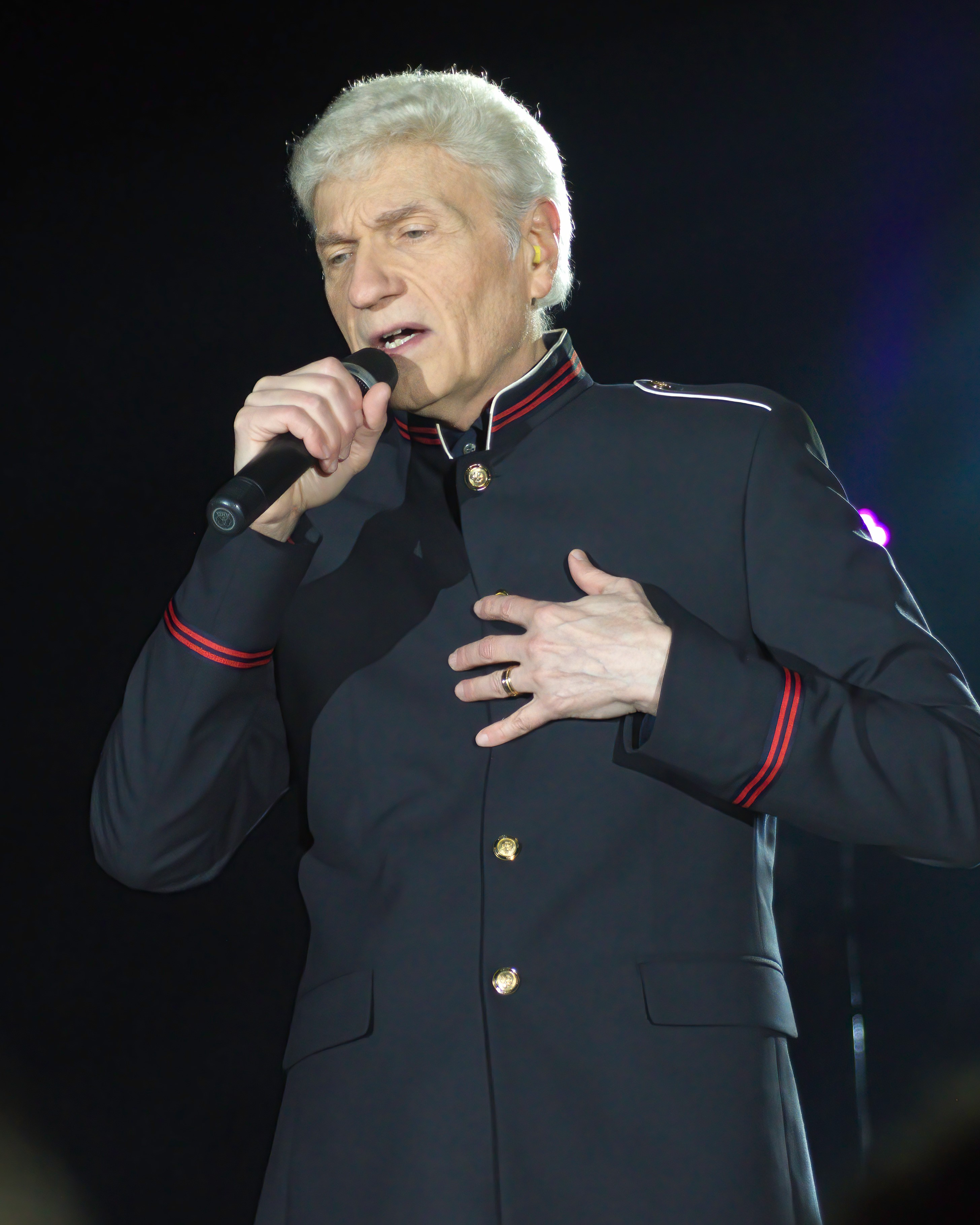
- DeYoung performing in 2019

Background information
- Born: February 18, 1947 (age 79); Chicago, Illinois, U.S.
- Genres: Rock; progressive rock; pop rock; soft rock; hard rock; Broadway
- Occupations: Singer; songwriter; musician; record producer
- Instruments: Vocals; keyboards
- Years active: 1961–present
- Formerly of: Styx
- Website: dennisdeyoung.com

Dennis DeYoung (born February 18, 1947) is an American singer, songwriter and keyboardist. He was a founding member of the rock band Styx and served as its primary lead vocalist and keyboardist from 1972 until 1999. DeYoung was the band's most prolific and successful writer, having been credited as the writer of more Styx songs than any other band member. DeYoung penned seven of the band's eight Billboard top 10 singles as well as a solo top 10 single. He has written and sung songs that hit the top 10 in 3 different decades, one of only a handful of artists to accomplish this longevity of success metric.

== Early life, family and education ==
Dennis DeYoung was born in Chicago, Illinois, to Maurice DeYoung (1918–1997) and Loraine Rolla DeYoung (1923–2001). He had a younger sister, Darcy, who died in 2021. Dennis and Darcy were raised Catholic. The family has Dutch and Italian ancestry. The family resided in the Roseland area of Chicago.

== Career ==
DeYoung started his career as an accordionist in 1962 at the age of 15 when he teamed up with his 13-year-old neighbors Chuck and John Panozzo in a three-piece combo originally called The Tradewinds. The trio added guitarist Tom Nardini in 1964 and renamed the band TW4. In 1968, Nardini was replaced by John Curulewski and in 1970 DeYoung hired James Young to become the second guitarist in TW4. The band changed the name to Styx in 1972, upon signing their first record contract.

Before the band met with success, DeYoung spent time as a music teacher in south suburban Chicago area's District 143. One teacher hosted dinner parties for co-workers; DeYoung always attended and would inevitably offer to play the piano. During this period, the band played a number of small venues and school auditoriums in an effort to secure a record deal.

=== 1972–1984: Tenure with Styx ===
Within Styx, DeYoung acted as lead vocalist, keyboardist, accordion player, producer and songwriter. From the start of Styx's commercial success with the 1973 DeYoung-penned single "Lady", DeYoung became the creative force behind most of the band's hit songs. DeYoung wrote and sang lead on seven of the band's eight top 10 Billboard Hot 100-ranked hits during this period, with Tommy Shaw's "Too Much Time on My Hands" (No. 9) being the sole exception. The seven DeYoung penned-and-performed top 10 Billboard hits, in order of their peak chart placement are:

- "Babe", the band's only Billboard Hot 100 No. 1 hit to date. Also hit No. 1 on Radio and Records chart.
- "Mr. Roboto" (No. 3 Billboard, No. 3 R & R)
- "Show Me the Way" (No. 3 Billboard, No. 7 R & R)
- "The Best of Times" (No. 3 and No. 1 R & R)
- "Don't Let It End" (No. 6 Billboard, No. 3 R & R)
- "Lady", the band's 1973 breakthrough hit (No. 6 in March 1975 Billboard and No. 7 R & R)
- "Come Sail Away" (No. 8 Billboard, No. 9 R & R)

A self-taught pianist, DeYoung became one of the most notable keyboard players in rock music. He was featured on the cover of the January 1981 issue of Contemporary Keyboard magazine, (Note: The story was reprinted in Contemporary Keyboard' book on the greatest rock keyboardists.) in which DeYoung described many of his steps along the way through his keyboard-playing career: He had never played an acoustic piano until the recording session for 1973's "Lady"; he recorded the track for 1979's "Babe" on a Fender Rhodes electric piano, an instrument he had never touched before, at Pumpkin Studios because the studio's grand piano was out of tune; when playing accordion for the song "Boat on the River" from the Cornerstone album, DeYoung discovered how small the keys felt to his fingers after years of playing pianos and Hammond organs.

DeYoung is notable for his prominent lead synthesizer solos performed on the Oberheim Four Voice that dominated the mix with a unique tone, a key element of the Styx sound. Influenced by the recent release of Emerson, Lake & Palmer's first album, DeYoung (a novice synthesizer player at the time) used a Moog modular synthesizer to record the keyboard tracks for Styx's debut album in 1972. This album featured a rock version of "Fanfare for the Common Man", more than five years before ELP came up with a similar idea of recording this classical composition as a rock band featuring the synthesizer, that would later become one of ELP's best known recordings.

DeYoung's songs often had a grandiose style to them in the tradition of 1970s theatrical rock, which heavily influenced the group's direction in the late 1970s, culminating in the concept albums Paradise Theatre (1981) and Kilroy Was Here (1983). The dissent of some members in the band during Kilroy brought tensions between the group's members over the future direction of the band, leading to guitarist Tommy Shaw's departure in 1984 to pursue a solo career.

=== 1984–1989: Early solo career ===
With Styx in limbo following Shaw's 1984 departure, DeYoung began a solo career of modest success. His first solo album, Desert Moon (1984), generated a top 10 hit, "Desert Moon", and the follow-up single, "Don't Wait for Heroes", cracked the Billboard Top 100 as well. The Desert Moon album was certified gold in Canada in 1984. To date, "Desert Moon" is the only solo single by any Styx member to hit the Billboard Top 10.

DeYoung's solo career continued with Back to the World (1986), which contained the singles "Call Me" and "This Is the Time", which was featured in the soundtrack of Karate Kid II (1986) movie. "Call Me" went to #6 on the Billboard AC chart and peak at #54 on the Hot 100, while "This is the Time" just cracked the AC top 40 and Billboard Hot 100. His third solo album Boomchild (1988) failed to have a hit single, though the video for "Boomchild" received a fair amount of music video airplay.

After a five-year hiatus; DeYoung and several other members of Styx began discussing a possible reunion in 1989. By December 1989, Styx had unofficially reformed. Tommy Shaw, who joined Damn Yankees in 1988, did not return.

=== 1990–1992: Reuniting with Styx ===
In 1990, Styx (minus Tommy Shaw, who was replaced by guitarist/singer-songwriter Glen Burtnik) returned to the studio for the album Edge of the Century (1990). "Show Me the Way", a track written by DeYoung for his son Matthew, received extensive radio play, peaking at #3 on the Billboard Hot 100 singles chart (Styx's 8th top 10 single, and 7th written and sung by DeYoung) particularly after a number of radio stations mixed it with voice tracks of members of Congress debating whether or not to send troops to the first Persian Gulf War. The group toured extensively before A&M Records (which had just merged with PolyGram Records) dropped the group from its roster in 1992; the group broke up again shortly afterwards.

=== 1993–1995: Venture into acting ===
Between stints with Styx, DeYoung was asked to appear in the 20th Anniversary revival tour of the stage musical Jesus Christ Superstar in 1993, including Ted Neeley, Carl Anderson and Irene Cara, appearing in 268 performances as Pontius Pilate. DeYoung was asked to perform by Tony-winning producer Forbes Candlish. Danny Goldberg, former DeYoung manager and head of A&R at Atlantic Records, asked DeYoung to record an album of Broadway standards; the resulting album, 10 on Broadway, was released in 1994. While touring with Jesus Christ Superstar, DeYoung began writing the book and score of a musical of his own based on Victor Hugo's 1831 novel The Hunchback of Notre-Dame. Hunchback was first produced in 1997 at the Tennessee Repertory Theatre in Nashville, Tennessee.

=== 1995–1999: Second reunion with Styx ===
A&M Records had released the compilation album Styx - Classics, Volume 15, but since A&M did not own the rights to the original recording of "Lady" (which had been released by Wooden Nickel Records through a distribution deal with RCA Records), the track could not be included on the disc. In 1995, DeYoung called on Shaw to sing on a new version of "Lady" even though he had not performed on the original. Styx reunited, but without a terminally ill John Panozzo. The band recorded a new version of "Lady," which became the lead track ("Lady '95") of a new compilation album, Styx Greatest Hits, for A&M. Todd Sucherman (uncredited) provided the drum track for the recording session. Panozzo died on July 16, 1996. Sucherman took his place, and in 1996, Styx toured for the first time in four years.

Styx's 1996 tour, dubbed the "Return to Paradise" tour by the band, proved remarkably successful, and a 2-disc live recording of the show (with three new studio tracks) proved even more so; 1997's Return to Paradise live album, produced by DeYoung, went gold and spawned a top-30 hit on Billboard's Adult Contemporary chart, the DeYoung-penned "Paradise". With the positive response and a new record label (CMC International), Styx returned to the studio in 1998 and began work on their first studio album in eight years.

=== 1999: Departure from Styx ===
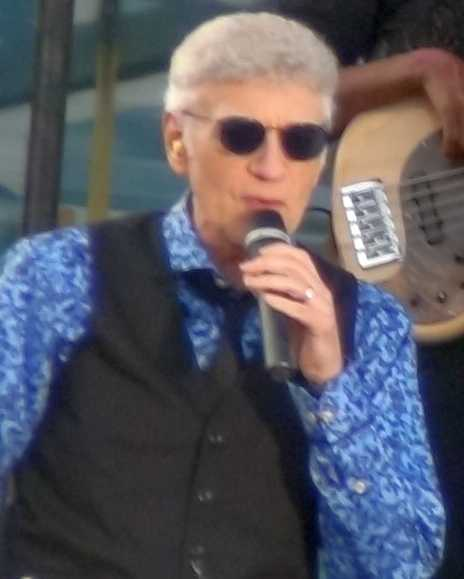
DeYoung performing in 2014

DeYoung and his bandmates celebrated the success of 1996's "Return to Paradise" tour, and 1997's "Grand Illusion" tour. In 1998 the band began work on a new album, Brave New World. In January 1998, DeYoung's physical health took a turn for the worse; DeYoung said he was afflicted with a severe case of the flu, and the extremely high fever damaged his eyes resulting in severe sensitivity to light which caused him heavy fatigue. James Young and Tommy Shaw suggested booking a tour in support of the Brave New World album. DeYoung asked for six months to recover; Shaw and Young instead replaced him with Canadian rocker Lawrence Gowan in 1999 and went on tour without DeYoung.

After this band toured for a year and a half under the name Styx, but without any compensation to DeYoung for usage of the name, DeYoung sued his former bandmates, seeking the rights to use the group's name in support of his solo career. The suit was settled in 2001, with the group being allowed to keep the name Styx and DeYoung able to use the name in descriptive phrases such as "the music of Styx" or "formerly of Styx" (but not "the voice of Styx"). DeYoung has said that the manner in which Shaw and Young vilified him on VH1's Behind the Music triggered the lawsuit.

Styx has consistently maintained that any chance of a reunion with DeYoung is unlikely. When asked about any possible reunions with DeYoung, James Young commented on an edition of VH1's Behind the Music television series, "Maybe when they are playing hockey on the river Styx. And maybe not even then." Young also addressed the reunion issue on an episode of VH1's Feuds 2000, noting the possibility of a reunion would only happen "[as] the Eagles said, 'when Hell freezes over'." Bassist Chuck Panozzo, no longer actively touring with Styx due to health problems associated with his HIV-positive status, offered a more hopeful tone to a writer doing a story on the band for tampabay.com; while reflecting on the effect the loss of his fraternal twin brother John had on the band, Panozzo noted, "Before any more of us die, I would hope that it could happen. Every year that it doesn't happen is another year that goes by. And if you wait too long, who will care?" However, in a 2011 interview with Rolling Stone, Tommy Shaw indicated that he didn't think a reunion was realistic, noting, "We're crazy, but we're not insane."

=== 2000–2019: Post-Styx career ===
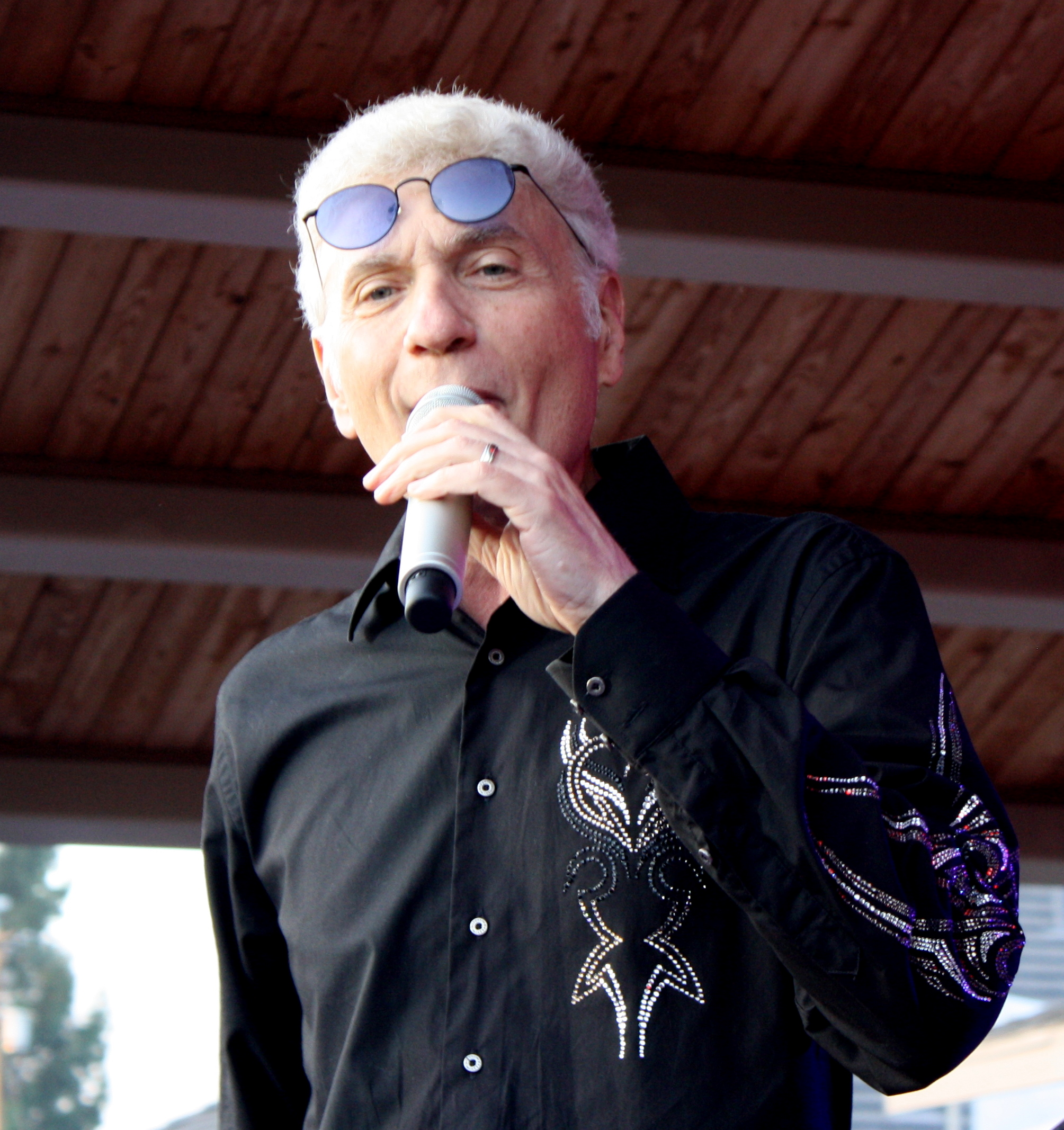
Dennis DeYoung performing in 2010

In February 2000, DeYoung was approached to perform a concert featuring his many songs from Styx, as well as his solo works and his 1997 stage musical The Hunchback of Notre Dame, with an orchestra. The show was performed at the Rosemont Theatre, near DeYoung's hometown of Chicago. His wife Suzanne and sister-in-law Dawn Marie Feusi were backup singers. The concert was well received and formed the basis for a touring version of the show, and eventually a 2004 live album, The Music of Styx - Live with Symphony Orchestra. DEP Records of Canada released the album in Canada in 2007 as Dennis DeYoung and the Music of Styx Live with Symphony Orchestra, which achieved platinum status (over 50,000 copies. (Note: In Canada, 50,000 plus copies sold for a double CD qualifies as platinum.)

After recovering from illness, DeYoung returned to touring with a 50-piece orchestra augmented by a five-piece rock band, which included Tommy Dziallo on guitar, Hank Horton on bass, and Kyle Woodring (formerly with John Mellencamp and Deana Carter) on drums, all of whom also played shows with DeYoung with or without the orchestra.

DeYoung made his major motion picture debut in 2005's The Perfect Man, in which he played the lead vocalist in a Styx tribute band.

On April 20, 2006, at the Community Theatre in Morristown, New Jersey, DeYoung performed with former Styx guitarist and bassist Glen Burtnik as part of his Lost Treasures concert series. It marked the first time in nearly seven years that the two had appeared together. The duo opened with the Beatles classic "We Can Work It Out" as well as "Watching the World Go By" and "All for Love", songs that were originally written for the unreleased Edge of the Century 2 Styx album.

In August 2006, DeYoung appeared along with Supertramp's Roger Hodgson on Canadian Idol, where he performed with and mentored the contestants. On September 14 and 15, 2006, DeYoung appeared with Hal Sparks on Celebrity Duets, an American reality television show produced by Simon Cowell. They sang Styx songs "Come Sail Away" and "Mr. Roboto". DeYoung and Sparks were invited back to perform in the final of Celebrity Duets on September 28, 2006. They performed the Styx breakthrough hit "Lady", written by DeYoung in 1973, with DeYoung serenading his wife Suzanne in the audience while Hal did the same for his long-time girlfriend, and finished in 3rd place.

DEP Records also released his DVD The Rock: Symphonic Music of Styx, which went triple platinum. In addition, he appeared on the Canadian reality TV series Star Académie. On June 19, 2007, DeYoung released in Canada his fifth solo album, One Hundred Years from Now, marking a return to his rock roots. The first single, the title track, was a duet with Québécois singer Éric Lapointe. The single reached number 1 on the Québec Radio Single and Soundscan charts. The album was released in the U.S. on April 14, 2009, with slightly different tracks. One song "I Believe In You" received some airplay on Sirius XM and some local radio stations.

On New Year's Eve 2007, he performed "Mr. Roboto", "Come Sail Away" and many other Styx classics at Victoria Park in Niagara Falls, Ontario, Canada, and viewers via live television on CHCH-TV Channel 11. Following his concert, he did a brief live interview with CHCH-TV's Mat Hayes.

On May 8, 2008, DeYoung's musical version of The Hunchback of Notre Dame premiered at the Bailiwick Repertory Theatre in Chicago. This production went on to win the Joseph Jefferson Award for best musical in Chicago in 2008.

On September 20, 2008, DeYoung performed at the Rock and Roll Hall of Fame benefit concert for the John Entwistle Foundation. The benefit concert was held at the Koka Booth Amphitheatre in Cary, North Carolina, and featured many other rock and roll musicians. He and his band performed many of Styx's hits.

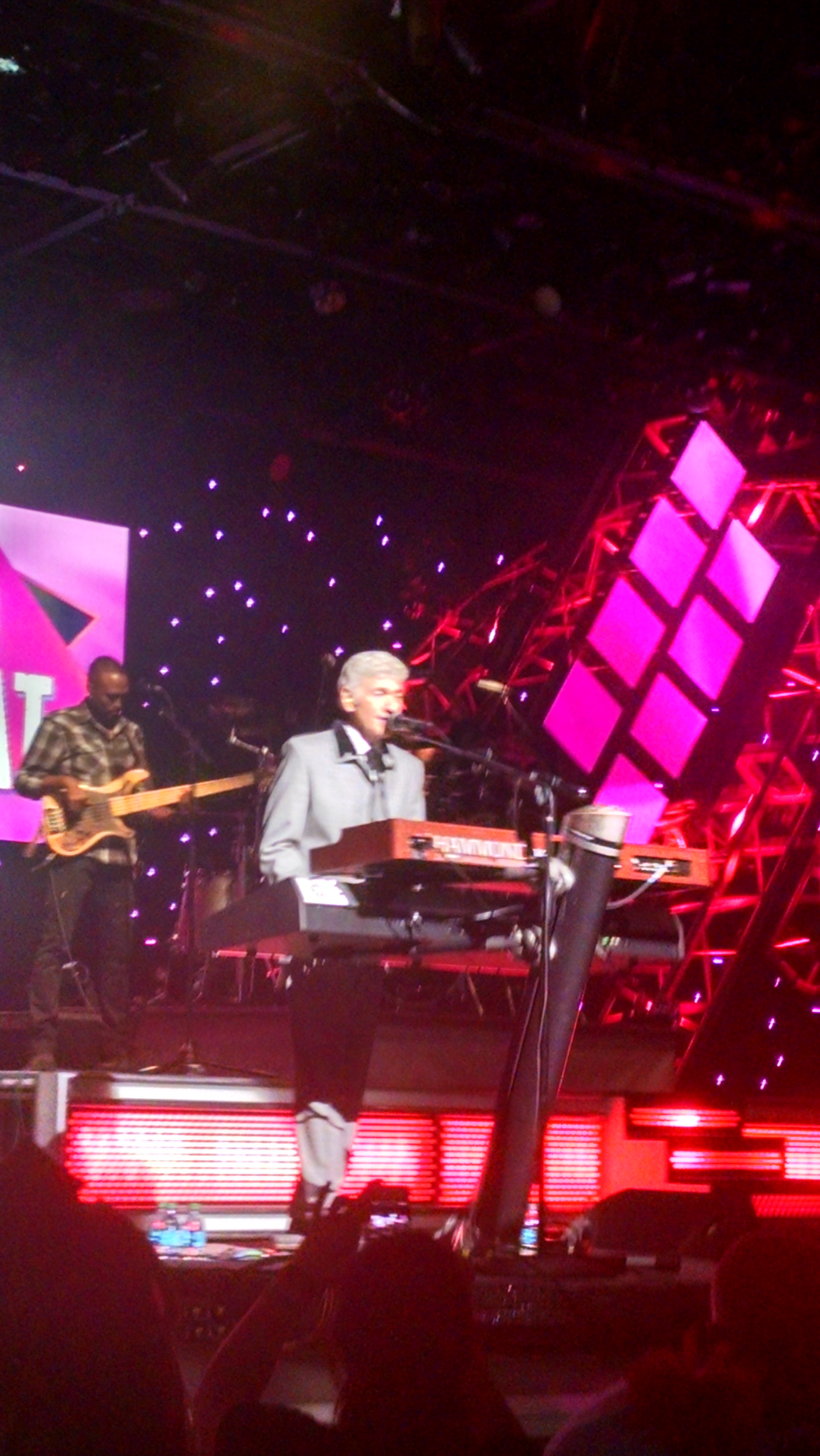
DeYoung performing during the 2014 Eat to the Beat Concert Series, part of the Epcot International Food & Wine Festival, in Walt Disney World

In November and December 2008, DeYoung was a featured artist on the German Night of the Proms 20-city tour. He joined Robin Gibb, Tears for Fears, 10cc and Kim Wilde on the sold-out tour. He also accompanied Robin Gibb of the Bee Gees on piano performing "How Deep Is Your Love".

On July 12, 2009, in his hometown Chicago, DeYoung was given a Great Performer of Illinois Award at "an annual festival in Millennium Park that celebrates best of art and culture in the State of Illinois Following the award ceremony in the Frank Gehry-designed Jay Pritzker Pavilion in the park, DeYoung and his band performed many of Styx's hits in a free concert.

In 2010, DeYoung formed a band dedicated to the music of Styx, adding guitarist and lead vocalist August Zadra and bassist-vocalist Craig Carter to join John Blasucci, guitarist Jimmy Leahey, Tom Sharpe (who left at the end of 2014 to continue his tenure with Mannheim Steamroller, and was replaced by Mike Morales), and wife Suzanne DeYoung in performing Styx hits "Renegade", "Blue Collar Man" and others as well as DeYoung's solo works.

On October 21, 2014, a 2 CD + DVD and Blu-ray package, Dennis DeYoung... And the Music of Styx Live in Los Angeles, was released in the US via Frontiers Records. The European release date was October 17, 2014. Also on October 21, 2014, a condensed version of this live concert package was broadcast on AXS TV Headliner Club Concert Series. The concert took place at the El Rey Theatre in Los Angeles, California, on March 18, 2014.

=== 2020–present: New studio albums ===
On May 22, 2020, DeYoung released 26 East, Vol. 1, his seventh solo studio album and first in over a decade. The title comes from the real-life address on the South Side of Chicago which DeYoung grew up in, where he formed the nucleus of what would become Styx. The last song on the record, "To the Good Old Days", features Julian Lennon.

26 East, Vol. 2 was released on June 11, 2021, and is intended to be DeYoung's final album. The album features fellow Chicago natives guitarist Tom Morello of Rage Against the Machine and Audioslave on a track co-written with Jim Peterik of The Ides of March, formerly of Survivor and 38 Special fame.

On June 5, 2022, Styx was inducted into the Illinois Rock & Roll Museum Hall of Fame. That same night Dennis DeYoung was additionally inducted as a songwriter.

In August 2023, it was announced the music publishing catalog rights for a majority of DeYoung's compositions had been acquired by the New York City-headquartered music publishing and talent management company, Primary Wave. The deal included master recording rights for a majority of recordings featuring DeYoung's performances.

== Personal life ==
On January 18, 1970, DeYoung married his longtime sweetheart Suzanne Feusi. They met at a high school dance when he was 17 years old and she was 15 years old. The couple have two children. DeYoung is a devout Catholic.

DeYoung is a fan of the Chicago White Sox and personal friend of former manager, Baseball Hall of Famer Tony LaRussa.

== Solo band personnel ==
=== Current members ===
- Dennis DeYoung – lead and backing vocals, keyboards
- Suzanne DeYoung – backing vocals, percussion
- John Blasucci – keyboards (2005–present)
- Jimmy Leahey – guitar, backing vocals (2008–present)
- August Zadra – guitar, lead and backing vocals (2010–present)
- Craig Carter – bass, backing vocals (2010–2026)
- Michael Morales – drums (2016–present)

=== Former members ===
- Tom Dziallo – guitar, backing vocals (1984–1988, 2003–2009)
- Hank Horton – bass, backing vocals (2003–2009)
- Kyle Woodring – drums, percussion (2003–2008)
- Rick Snyder – keyboards, vocals (2003–2004)
- Dawn Feusi – backing vocals (2003–2004)
- Glen Burtnik – guitar, lead and backing vocals (2006–2009)
- Jeff Watson – guitar, backing vocals (2009)
- Tom Sharpe – drums, percussion (2008–2016)

== Discography ==
=== Studio albums ===
- Desert Moon (1984)
- Back to the World (1986)
- Boomchild (1989)
- 10 on Broadway (1994)
- The Hunchback of Notre Dame (1996)
- One Hundred Years from Now (2007)
- 26 East, Vol. 1 (2020)
- 26 East, Vol. 2 (2021)

=== with Styx ===
- Styx (1972)
- Styx II (1973)
- The Serpent Is Rising (1973)
- Man of Miracles (1974)
- Equinox (1975)
- Crystal Ball (1976)
- The Grand Illusion (1977)
- Pieces of Eight (1978)
- Cornerstone (1979)
- Paradise Theatre (1981)
- Kilroy Was Here (1983)
- Caught in the Act (live, 1984)
- Edge of the Century (1990)
- Return to Paradise (live, 1997)
- Brave New World (1999)

=== Live albums ===
- The Music of Styx – Live with Symphony Orchestra (2004)
- Dennis DeYoung and the Music of Styx - Live in Los Angeles (2014)

=== Compilation albums ===
- The Ultimate Collection (1999)

=== Video albums ===
- Caught in the Act (1984)
- Return to Paradise (1997)
- Dennis DeYoung – Soundstage (2003)
- Symphonic Rock Music of Styx (2003)
- The Best of Styx – 20th Century Masters (2004)
- The Best of Dennis DeYoung – 20th Century Masters (2005)

=== Other appearances ===
Music written by DeYoung has been featured in the following films:

- Kilroy Was Here (1983)
- The Karate Kid, Part II (1986)
- The Virgin Suicides (1999)
- Big Daddy (1999)
- Detroit Rock City (1999)
- Austin Powers in Goldmember (2002)
- Old School (2003)
- Shrek 2 (2004)
- The Perfect Man (2005), as "Dennis DeYoung impersonator"

Music either written by DeYoung or performed by him has been featured in the following stage productions:

- "Pilate and Jesus", "Pilate's Dream" (Jesus Christ Superstar) (1993) (Music: Andrew Lloyd Webber; Lyrics: Tim Rice)

The debut of musical The Hunchback of Notre Dame in May 2008 in Chicago, Illinois brought finally DeYoung's music and songs to the theatrical stage.

Music written by DeYoung has also been featured in television shows and commercials. Among the more notable are:

- The Simpsons
- My Name is Earl
- Arrested Development
- That '70s Show
- Freaks and Geeks
- Dharma and Greg
- ER
- Chuck
- King of Queens
- Sex and the City
- South Park
- Family Guy
- The Office
- It's Always Sunny in Philadelphia
- Glee
- Modern Family
- The Goldbergs
