= List of guitarists =

This list of guitarists includes notable musicians, known principally for their guitar playing, for whom there is an article in Wikipedia. Those who are known mainly as bass guitarists are listed separately at List of bass guitarists.

== A ==
- Johnny A.
- Tora Dahle Aagård
- Tosin Abasi (Animals as Leaders)
- Abbath (ex-Immortal, ex-I, Abbath)
- "Dimebag" Darrell Abbott (Pantera)
- Drew Abbott
- John Abercrombie
- Aaron "El Hefe" Abeyta (NOFX)
- Mick Abrahams (Jethro Tull)
- William Ackerman
- Bryan Adams
- Stuart Adamson (The Skids, Big Country, The Raphaels)
- Marcus Adoro (Eraserheads)
- Dionisio Aguado y García
- Salman Ahmad
- Mikael Åkerfeldt (Opeth, Storm Corrosion)
- Fredrik Åkesson (Opeth)
- Jan Akkerman (Focus)
- Damon Albarn (Blur, Gorillaz)
- Nate Albert (The Mighty Mighty Bosstones, The Kickovers)
- Steve Albini (Big Black, Rapeman, Shellac)
- Art Alexakis (Everclear)
- Michael Algar (Toy Dolls)
- Carson Allen
- Kris Allen
- Paul Allender (Cradle of Filth)
- Keith Allison (Paul Revere & the Raiders)
- Duane Allman (The Allman Brothers Band)
- Laurindo Almeida
- Carlos Alomar (David Bowie)
- Vicente Amigo
- Michael Amott (Arch Enemy)
- Christopher Amott (ex-Arch Enemy, Armageddon)
- Trey Anastasio (Phish)
- Ian Anderson (Jethro Tull)
- Muriel Anderson
- Magnus Andersson
- Nicke Andersson (Hellacopters, Supershit 666)
- André 3000 (Outkast)
- Jake Andrews
- Celeina Ann (Carole & Tuesday)
- Faraz Anwar (Mizraab)
- Julián Arcas
- Gem Archer (Heavy Stereo, Oasis)
- Joan Armatrading
- Armik
- Billie Joe Armstrong (Green Day, Pinhead Gunpowder, Foxboro Hot Tubs, The Network)
- Tim Armstrong (Operation Ivy, Rancid, Transplants)
- Joseph Arthur
- Paul "Bonehead" Arthurs (Oasis)
- Jeff Arwadi (Altera Enigma, Kekal)
- Carl Asercion
- Daniel Ash (Bauhaus, Tones on Tail, Love and Rockets)
- DJ Ashba (BulletBoys, Beautiful Creatures, Sixx:A.M.)
- Peter Asher (Peter and Gordon)
- Ron Asheton (The Stooges)
- Gwyn Ashton
- John Ashton (The Psychedelic Furs)
- Sérgio Assad
- Gustavo Assis-Brasil
- Chet Atkins
- Paul Atkinson (The Zombies)
- Dan Auerbach (The Black Keys)
- Doug Aldrich (Whitesnake)

== B ==
- Jim Babjak (The Smithereens)
- Ayub Bachchu (Love Runs Blind)
- Matt Bachand (Shadows Fall)
- Randy Bachman (Bachman–Turner Overdrive, The Guess Who)
- Derek Bailey
- Dave Bainbridge (Iona)
- Ian Bairnson (Pilot, The Alan Parsons Project, Kate Bush)
- Brian Baker (Minor Threat, Dag Nasty, Bad Religion)
- Mickey Baker
- Dave Baksh (Sum 41, Brown Brigade)
- David Ball (Soft Cell)
- Bruce Bouillet (Racer X)
- Terry Balsamo (Evanescence)
- Perry Bamonte (The Cure)
- Devendra Banhart
- Benji Madden (Good Charlotte)
- Paul Banks (Interpol)
- Peter Banks (Yes)
- Carl Barât (The Libertines, Dirty Pretty Things)
- Barbecue Bob
- Warren Barfield
- Don Barnes (38 Special)
- Martin Barre (Jethro Tull)
- Paul Barrere (Little Feat)
- Syd Barrett (Pink Floyd)
- Agustín Barrios
- Nicholas Barron
- Steve Bartek (Oingo Boingo)
- Desireé Bassett
- Joshua Bassett
- Michael Angelo Batio (Nitro)
- Jennifer Batten
- Roland Bautista (Earth, Wind & Fire)
- Jeff "Skunk" Baxter (Steely Dan, The Doobie Brothers)
- Brendan Bayliss (Umphrey's McGee)
- Eric Bazilian (The Hooters)
- Reb Beach (Winger, Whitesnake)
- Corey Beaulieu (Trivium)
- Beck
- Jeff Beck (The Yardbirds, The Jeff Beck Group, Beck, Bogert & Appice)
- Joe Beck
- Justin Beck (Glassjaw)
- Joe Becker
- Jason Becker (Cacophony, David Lee Roth)
- Walter Becker (Steely Dan)
- Peter Beckett (Player)
- Johanna Beisteiner
- Adrian Belew (King Crimson, The Bears; Talking Heads, David Bowie, Frank Zappa)
- Drake Bell
- Brian Bell (Weezer, Space Twins, The Relationship)
- Eric Bell (Thin Lizzy)
- J.J. Belle
- Matt Bellamy (Muse)
- Dustin Belt (Heffron Drive)
- Roni Benise
- Bob Bennett
- Chester Bennington (Linkin Park)
- Brendan Benson (The Raconteurs)
- George Benson
- Miki Berenyi (Lush)
- Peter Bernstein
- Chuck Berry
- Gene Bertoncini
- Nuno Bettencourt (Extreme)
- Dickey Betts (The Allman Brothers Band)
- Randall Bewley (Pylon)
- Bo Bice
- Big Tom
- Kat Bjelland (Babes in Toyland)
- Anders Björler (At the Gates, The Haunted)
- Ivar Bjørnson (Enslaved)
- Clint Black
- Jack Black (Tenacious D)
- Ritchie Blackmore (Deep Purple, Rainbow, Blackmore's Night)
- Tony Blair
- Zach Blair (Hagfish, Gwar, Only Crime, Rise Against)
- Blind Blake
- Norman Blake
- Norman Blake (Teenage Fanclub)
- Ron Block (Alison Krauss)
- Conny Bloom (Hanoi Rocks)
- Mike Bloomfield
- Bob Bogle (The Ventures)
- John Bohlinger (musician)
- Marc Bolan (T.Rex)
- Tommy Bolin (Deep Purple)
- Joe Bonamassa
- Bono (U2)
- Nicke Borg (Backyard Babies)
- Adrian Borland (The Sound)
- Wes Borland (Limp Bizkit)
- Mark Boston (Captain Beefheart and his Magic Band)
- Jean-Paul Bourelly
- James Bourne (Son of Dork)
- Pierre Bouvier (Simple Plan)
- Robert Bowlin
- James Bowman (Against Me!)
- Mick Box (Uriah Heep)
- James Dean Bradfield (Manic Street Preachers)
- Paul Brady
- Michelle Branch (The Wreckers)
- Srđan Branković (Alogia)
- Vito Bratta (White Lion)
- Creed Bratton (The Grass Roots)
- Jacques Brautbar (Phantom Planet)
- Julian Bream
- Lenny Breau
- Thomas Bredahl (Volbeat)
- Thom Bresh
- Paul Brett
- Mike Brewer
- John Brewster (The Angels)'s
- Lincoln Brewster
- Vic Briggs (Eric Burdon & The Animals)
- Terry Britten
- Chris Broderick (Megadeth)
- Dave Brock (Hawkwind)
- Isaac Brock (Modest Mouse, Ugly Casanova)
- David Bromberg
- Devin Bronson (Avril Lavigne, Kelly Clarkson)
- Michael Brook
- Garth Brooks
- Kix Brooks (Brooks & Dunn)
- Meredith Brooks
- Big Bill Broonzy
- Bobby Broom
- Ethan Brosh
- Eric Brosius (Tribe)
- Drew Brown (OneRepublic)
- Mike Brown
- Jackson Browne (Nitty Gritty Dirt Band)
- Bob Brozman
- Norman Brown
- Oli Brown (RavenEye)
- Michael Bruce (Alice Cooper)
- Jimmy Bruno
- Mark Bryan (Hootie & the Blowfish)
- Amalie Bruun (Myrkur)
- Wally Bryson (Raspberries)
- Roy Buchanan
- Peter Buck (R.E.M.)
- Buckethead (Guns N' Roses, Praxis, Deli Creeps, Colonel Claypool's Bucket of Bernie Brains)
- Lindsey Buckingham (Fleetwood Mac)
- Jonny Buckland (Coldplay)
- Jeff Buckley
- Ely Buendia (Eraserheads, Pupil)
- Jimmy Buffett
- Charlie Burchill (Simple Minds)
- Ben Burnley (Breaking Benjamin)
- Christian Burns (BBMak)
- Jake Burns (Stiff Little Fingers)
- Vinny Burns (Ten)
- R. L. Burnside
- Kenny Burrell
- James Burton (Ricky Nelson, Elvis Presley, John Denver)
- Kristian Bush (Sugarland)
- Bernard Butler (Suede, The Tears)
- John Butler (John Butler Trio)
- Jonathan Butler
- Damon Buxton
- Glen Buxton (Alice Cooper)
- Roddy "Radiation" Byers (The Specials)
- Charlie Byrd
- David Byrne (Talking Heads)
- Rico Blanco (Rivermaya)

== C ==
- Fito Cabrales (Platero y Tú, Fito & Fitipaldis)
- Kevin Cadogan (Third Eye Blind)
- Chris Caffery (Trans-Siberian Orchestra)
- Charlotte Caffey (The Go-Go's)
- Paul Caiafa (The Misfits, Kryst the Conqueror, Gorgeous Frankenstein)
- Colbie Caillat
- Al Caiola
- JJ Cale
- Randy California (Spirit)
- Jo Callis (The Rezillos, The Human League)
- Greg Camp (Smash Mouth)
- Jeremy Camp
- Glen Campbell
- Mike Campbell (Tom Petty and the Heartbreakers)
- Phil Campbell (Motörhead)
- Royce Campbell
- Vivian Campbell (Dio, Whitesnake, Def Leppard)
- Mike Campese
- Jim Campilongo
- Rob Cantor (Tally Hall)
- Jerry Cantrell (Alice in Chains)
- Joey Cape (Me First and the Gimme Gimmes, Bad Astronaut)
- Captain Sensible (The Damned)
- Matteo Carcassi
- Larry Carlton
- Jesse Carmichael (Kara's Flowers)
- Sabrina Carpenter
- Stephen Carpenter (Deftones)
- Pete Carr
- Chris Carrabba (Dashboard Confessional, Further Seems Forever)
- Kim Carroll
- John Valentine Carruthers (Siouxsie and the Banshees)
- Maybelle Carter (Carter Family)
- Ferdinando Carulli
- Neko Case (The New Pornographers)
- Al Casey (jazz guitarist)
- Al Casey (rock guitarist)
- Johnny Cash
- Nick Catanese (Black Label Society)
- Philip Catherine
- Stephen Caudel
- Max Cavalera (Sepultura, Soulfly, Cavalera Conspiracy, Nailbomb)
- Dino Cazares (Fear Factory, Divine Heresy)
- Danny Cedrone (Bill Haley & His Comets)
- Gustavo Cerati (Soda Stereo)
- Franco Cerri
- Nic Cester (Jet)
- Yavuz Çetin
- Eugene Chadbourne
- António Chainho
- Bill Champlin (Sons of Champlin)
- Eason Chan
- Jaycee Chan
- Jerry Chang
- Gary Chapman
- Manny Charlton (Nazareth)
- Charo
- David Chastain (Chastain)
- Rhys Chatham
- Chris Cheney (The Living End)
- Andrew Cheshire
- Phil Chevron (The Pogues)
- Moraíto Chico II
- Michael Guy Chislett (The Academy Is..., Hillsong United)
- Jay Chou
- John Christ (Danzig)
- Charlie Christian (Benny Goodman)
- Stephen Christian (Anberlin)
- Popa Chubby
- Don Ciccone (Frankie Valli and the Four Seasons, The Critters)
- Martin Cilia (The Atlantics)
- Jake Cinninger (Umphrey's McGee)
- John Cipollina (Quicksilver Messenger Service)
- Liam Clancy (The Clancy Brothers, Makem and Clancy)
- Eric Clapton (John Mayall & the Bluesbreakers, The Yardbirds, Cream, Blind Faith, Derek and the Dominos)
- Angus Clark (Trans-Siberian Orchestra)
- Gary Clark Jr.
- Mike Clark (Suicidal Tendencies)
- Roy Clark
- Steve Clark (Def Leppard)
- "Fast" Eddie Clarke (Motörhead)
- Gilby Clarke (Guns N' Roses, Rock Star Supernova)
- Frank Claussen (Theatre of Tragedy)
- Zal Cleminson (Sensational Alex Harvey Band)
- Nels Cline (Wilco)
- Henry Cluney (Stiff Little Fingers)
- Kurt Cobain (Nirvana)
- Eddie Cochran
- Stephen Cochran
- Bruce Cockburn
- Leonard Cohen
- Sam Cohen
- Jesse Colburn (Avril Lavigne)
- Deborah Coleman
- Johnny Colla (Huey Lewis and the News)
- Phil Collen (Def Leppard)
- Ned Collette
- Chris Collingwood (Fountains of Wayne)
- Albert Collins
- Allen Collins (Lynyrd Skynyrd)
- Paul Collins (The Beat)
- Paul Colman (Newsboys, Paul Colman Trio)
- Gary Lee Conner (Screaming Trees)
- John Connolly (Sevendust)
- Bill Connors
- Nico Constantine (Madfly, Comes with the Fall)
- Steve Conte (New York Dolls), (Eric Burdon)
- Ry Cooder (Captain Beefheart and his Magic Band, The Seeds)
- Jesse Cook
- Kyle Cook (Matchbox Twenty, The New Left)
- Mike Cooley (musician) (Drive-by Truckers)
- Rusty Cooley (Dominion, Outworld)
- Gaz Coombes (Supergrass)
- John Corabi (Angora, The Scream, Mötley Crüe, Union)
- Francesco Corbetta
- Easton Corbin
- Billy Corgan (The Smashing Pumpkins)
- Chris Cornell (Soundgarden)
- Gene Cornish (The Rascals, Fotomaker)
- Hugh Cornwell (The Stranglers)
- Jim Corr (The Corrs)
- Larry Coryell
- Miranda Cosgrove
- Yamandu Costa
- Napoléon Coste
- Sean Costello
- Elizabeth Cotten
- Jeff Cotton (Captain Beefheart and his Magic Band)
- Andy Cox (The Beat, Fine Young Cannibals)
- Laura Cox
- Graham Coxon (Blur)
- Jonathan Coulton
- Steve Cradock
- Andrew Craighan (My Dying Bride)
- Philo Cramer (Fear)
- Dan Crary
- Robert Cray
- Marshall Crenshaw
- Jim Croce
- Kevin Cronin (REO Speedwagon)
- Jason Cropper (Weezer)
- Steve "The Colonel" Cropper (The Mar-Keys, Booker T. & the M.G.'s)
- David Crosby (Crosby, Stills, Nash & Young, The Byrds)
- Robbin Crosby (Ratt)
- Sheryl Crow
- Allison Crowe
- András Csáki
- Cui Jian
- Josh Cunningham (The Waifs)
- Rivers Cuomo (Weezer, Avant Garde, Homie)
- Shannon Curfman
- John Curulewski (Styx)
- Billy Ray Cyrus
- Miley Cyrus
- Trace Cyrus

== D ==
- Britt Daniel (Spoon, Divine Fits)
- Dante DeCaro (Hot Hot Heat, Johnny and the Moon)
- Denis D'Amour (Voivod)
- Donnie Dacus
- Marcel Dadi
- Dick Dale
- Brody Dalle (The Distillers)
- Sean Danielsen (Smile Empty Soul, World Fire Brigade)
- Jol Dantzig (Wilson Pickett, Shaw Blades, Jim Carroll)
- Glenn Danzig (Danzig)
- Dave Davies (The Kinks)
- Ray Davies (The Kinks)
- Brad Davis (musician)
- Reverend Gary Davis
- Rod Davis (The Quarrymen)
- Jesse Ed Davis
- Keeley Davis (Denali, Engine Down)
- Maura Davis (Denali)
- Mike Dawes
- Christopher Dean
- Mahyar Dean (Angband)
- Nicolas de Angelis
- Chris de Burgh
- Marco Aurelio Zani de Ferranti
- Chris DeGarmo (Queensrÿche)
- Vance DeGeneres (Cowboy Mouth)
- Reina del Cid
- Dean DeLeo (Talk Show, Stone Temple Pilots)
- Tom DeLonge (Blink-182, Box Car Racer, Angels & Airwaves)
- Warren DeMartini (Ratt)
- Brad Delp (Boston)
- Brad Delson (Linkin Park)
- Paul Dempsey (Something for Kate)
- Tommy Denander (Michael Jackson, Paul Stanley, Alice Cooper, Ricky Martin, Toto)
- Duane Denison (The Jesus Lizard, Tomahawk, Firewater)
- Tom Denney (A Day To Remember)
- John Denver
- Johnny Depp
- Amir Derakh (Orgy, Julien-K, Rough Cutt)
- Mike Derks (Gwar)
- Rick Derringer (The McCoys, Johnny Winter, Edgar Winter)
- Jason De Ron (Altera Enigma, Paramaecium)
- C.C. DeVille (Poison)
- Mat Devine (Kill Hannah)
- Tommy DeVito (The Four Seasons)
- Roberto Diana
- Dennis "Denny" Dias, Steely Dan
- Alirio Díaz
- Diblo Dibala
- Bo Diddley
- Dido
- Ani DiFranco
- Steve Diggle (Buzzcocks)
- Al Di Meola (Return to Forever, Go)
- Pete Doherty (The Libertines, Babyshambles)
- Peter Dolving (Mary Beats Jane, The Haunted)
- Dan Donegan (Disturbed)
- Donovan
- Edsel Dope (Dope)
- Paul Dorrington
- Paul Doucette (Matchbox Twenty)
- Captain Kirk Douglas (The Roots)
- Jerry Douglas
- K. K. Downing (Judas Priest)
- Dr. Know (Bad Brains)
- Nick Drake
- Pete Drake
- Dregen (Backyard Babies, The Hellacopters)
- Bruce Driscoll (Blondfire, Brookville)
- Glen Drover (Megadeth, King Diamond, Eidolon)
- Steven Drozd (The Flaming Lips)
- Ian D'Sa (Billy Talent)
- Chris Duarte
- Les Dudek
- Billy Duffy (The Cult)
- Jan Dumée (Focus, On the Rocks)
- Tom Dumont (No Doubt, Invincible Overlord)
- Gary Duncan (Quicksilver Messenger Service)
- Andy Dunlop (Travis)
- Ronnie Dunn (Brooks & Dunn)
- Kyle Bobby Dunn
- Francis Dunnery (It Bites)
- Jesse James Dupree (Jackyl)
- Sherri DuPree (Eisley)
- William DuVall (Neon Christ, Madfly, Comes with the Fall, Alice in Chains)
- Adam Dutkiewicz (Killswitch Engage)
- Roland Dyens
- Doyle Dykes
- Bob Dylan
- Jakob Dylan (The Wallflowers)
- Jerry Donahue

== E ==
- Ronnie Earl
- Steve Earle
- Elliot Easton (The Cars, The New Cars)
- Duane Eddy
- The Edge (U2)
- Dave Edmunds
- Kathleen Edwards
- Nokie Edwards (The Ventures)
- Richey Edwards (Manic Street Preachers)
- Kian Egan (Westlife)
- Stephen Egerton (Descendents)
- Eduardo Egüez
- Hucky Eichelmann
- Mike Einziger (Incubus)
- Tripp Eisen (Static-X, Dope, Murderdolls)
- Mattias Eklundh (Freak Kitchen)
- Danny Elfman (Oingo Boingo)
- Lindsay Ell
- Dolan Ellis
- Herb Ellis
- John Ellis (The Stranglers)
- Tommy Emmanuel
- Rik Emmett (Triumph), (Solo)
- John Engelbert (Johnossi)
- Thomas Erak (The Fall of Troy)
- Eric Erlandson (Hole)
- Sully Erna (Godsmack)
- Christian Escoudé
- Omar Espinosa (Escape the Fate, LoveHateHero)
- Esteban
- Kevin Eubanks
- Ben Eunson
- Euronymous (Mayhem)
- Dennis Eveland
- Jason Everman (Nirvana, Soundgarden)
- George Ezra

== F ==
- John Fahey
- Bruce Fairweather (Mother Love Bone, Green River)
- Nick Falcon (The Young Werewolves)
- Todd Fancey (The New Pornographers)
- Bernard Fanning (Powderfinger)
- Tal Farlow
- Mark Farner (Grand Funk Railroad)
- John Farrar (The Shadows)
- Andrew Farriss (INXS)
- Tim Farriss (INXS)
- Josh Farro (Paramore)
- Eric Faulkner (Bay City Rollers)
- Newton Faulkner
- Don Felder (Eagles)
- José Feliciano
- Jay Ferguson (Sloan)
- Jeremy "Jinxx" Ferguson (Black Veil Brides)
- Jim Ferguson
- Dean Fertita Queens of the Stone Age, The Waxwings The Dead Weather
- Roger C. Field
- Scott Fields
- Zach Filkins (OneRepublic)
- Robin Finck (Nine Inch Nails, Guns N' Roses)
- Jon Finn (Jon Finn Group)
- Michael Lee Firkins
- Jörg Fischer (Accept)
- Bradley Fish
- Samantha Fish
- Roger Fisher (Heart)
- Eliot Fisk
- Warren Fitzgerald (Oingo Boingo, The Vandals)
- John Flansburgh (They Might Be Giants)
- Lester Flatt (Bill Monroe and his Blue Grass Boys, Foggy Mountain Boys, Nashville Grass)
- Flattus Maximus (Gwar)
- Tom Fletcher (McFly)
- Brandon Flowers (The Killers)
- Robb Flynn (Machine Head)
- William Foden
- John Fogerty (Creedence Clearwater Revival)
- Tom Fogerty (Creedence Clearwater Revival)
- Ben Folds (Ben Folds Five)
- Sue Foley
- Lita Ford (The Runaways)
- Marc Ford (The Black Crowes)
- Robben Ford
- Chris Foreman (Madness)
- Jon Foreman (Switchfoot)
- Richard Fortus (The Psychedelic Furs, Love Spit Love, Guns N' Roses)
- François de Fossa
- Rick Foster
- Alex Fox
- Oz Fox (Stryper, SinDizzy)
- Les Fradkin (Beatlemania (musical))
- Peter Frampton (Humble Pie, The Herd)
- Black Francis (Pixies)
- Lars Frederiksen (Rancid, Lars Frederiksen and the Bastards)
- Ace Frehley (KISS)
- Jay Jay French (Twisted Sister)
- Glenn Frey (Eagles)
- Matthew Friedberger (The Fiery Furnaces)
- Marty Friedman (Megadeth, Cacophony)
- Bill Frisell
- Robert Fripp (King Crimson)
- Fred Frith (Henry Cow, Art Bears)
- Edgar Froese (Tangerine Dream)
- Uri Frost (Katamine)
- John Frusciante (Red Hot Chili Peppers)
- Koichi Fukuda (Static-X)
- Bobby Fuller (The Bobby Fuller Four)
- Jim Fuller (The Surfaris)
- Justin Furstenfeld (Blue October, The Last Wish)
- Nelly Furtado
- Magne Furuholmen (a-ha)
- Marc Ferrari

== G ==
- Steve Gaines (Lynyrd Skynyrd)
- Declan Galbraith
- Eric Gale
- Eric Gales
- Noel Gallagher (Oasis)
- Rory Gallagher
- Shane Gallagher (+44)
- Cliff Gallup
- Frank Gambale
- Tim Gane (Stereolab)
- Sunil Ganguly
- Charly García (Sui Generis, Porsuigieco, La Máquina de Hacer Pájaros, Serú Girán)
- Jerry Garcia (Grateful Dead)
- Ricardo Garcia
- Roopam Garg
- Len Garry (The Quarrymen)
- Chuck Garvey (moe.)
- Kyle Gass (Tenacious D)
- Diego del Gastor
- Synyster Gates (Avenged Sevenfold, Pinkly Smooth)
- Danny Gatton
- Dick Gaughan
- Eelco Gelling (Cuby + Blizzards, Golden Earring)
- Björn Gelotte (In Flames)
- Joseph Genaro (The Dead Milkmen)
- Vicki Genfan
- Antony Genn (The Mescaleros, The Hours)
- Dave Genn (Matthew Good Band)
- Lowell George (The Mothers of Invention, Little Feat)
- Rocky George (Suicidal Tendencies)
- Janick Gers (Iron Maiden)
- Per Gessle (Gyllene Tider, Roxette)
- Andy Gibb
- Barry Gibb (Bee Gees)
- Maurice Gibb (Bee Gees)
- Ben Gibbard (Death Cab for Cutie, The Postal Service, ¡All-Time Quarterback!)
- Billy Gibbons (ZZ Top)
- Gilberto Gil
- Paul Gilbert (Mr. Big, Racer X)
- João Gilberto
- Nick Gilder (Sweeney Todd)
- Brad Gillis (Night Ranger)
- David Gilmour (Pink Floyd)
- Vince Gill (Pure Prairie League)
- Gordon Giltrap
- Greg Ginn (Black Flag)
- Chad I Ginsburg (CKY)
- Mauro Giuliani
- George Gobel
- Nicolas Godin (Air)
- Mircea Gogoncea
- Lynval Golding (The Specials)
- Sander Gommans (After Forever)
- Pier Gonella (Mastercastle–Necrodeath)
- Adam Gontier (Three Days Grace)
- Dave Gonzalez (The Paladins, Hacienda Brothers)
- José González
- Pedro Javier González
- Myles Goodwyn (April Wine)
- Nina Gordon (Veruca Salt)
- Martin Gore (Depeche Mode)
- Scott Gorham (Thin Lizzy)
- Grisha Goryachev
- Chris Goss (Masters of Reality)
- Stone Gossard (Green River, Mother Love Bone, Temple of the Dog, Pearl Jam)
- Manuel Göttsching (Ash Ra Tempel)
- Johnny Goudie (Goudie)
- Ellie Goulding
- Barry Goudreau (Boston)
- Guthrie Govan
- Laura Jane Grace (Against Me!)
- Gerhard Graf-Martinez
- Davey Graham
- Amy Grant
- James Grant (Love and Money)
- Rocky Gray (Soul Embraced)
- Jay Graydon
- Doug Grean
- Boris Grebenshchikov (Aquarium)
- Dallas Green (Alexisonfire, City and Colour)
- Freddie Green (Count Basie)
- Gary Green (Gentle Giant)
- Grant Green
- Peter Green (Fleetwood Mac)
- Ted Greene
- Norman Greenbaum
- Alex Greenwald (Phantom Planet)
- Brian Greenway (April Wine, Mashmakhan)
- Jonny Greenwood (Radiohead)
- Dave Gregory (XTC)
- David Grier
- Ryan Griffiths (The Vines)
- Carl Johan Grimmark (Narnia, Rob Rock, Saviour Machine, Beautiful Sin)
- Dave Grohl (Foo Fighters, Nirvana)
- Stefan Grossman
- Luther Grosvenor (Spooky Tooth)
- Todd Grubbs
- Lalo Guerrero
- Guinga
- Michael Gulezian
- Trey Gunn (King Crimson), (David Sylvian)
- Tracii Guns (L.A. Guns, Guns N' Roses, Brides of Destruction)
- Brett Gurewitz (Bad Religion, Error)
- James Gurley (Big Brother and the Holding Company)
- Michael Gurley (Dada)
- Gus G (Firewind)
- Buddy Guy

== H ==
- Steve Hackett (Genesis, GTR, Squackett)
- Amir John Haddad
- Sammy Hagar (Van Halen, Chickenfoot, The Circle)
- Ivar Haglund
- Bill Haley (Bill Haley and His Comets)
- GP Hall
- Jim Hall
- Kristen Hall (Sugarland)
- Mary Halvorson
- Mike Hamilton (Kenny Loggins, Peter Kater, Jay Ferguson)
- Page Hamilton (Helmet)
- Shannon Hamm (Death, Control Denied)
- Chuck Hammer (Lou Reed, David Bowie, Guitarchitecture)
- Kirk Hammett (Metallica)
- Peter Hammill (Van der Graaf Generator)
- Albert Hammond Jr. (The Strokes)
- Michael Hampton (Funkadelic)
- Jeff Hanneman (Slayer)
- Brian Haner Sr.
- Andrew Hansen
- Kai Hansen (Gamma Ray)
- Fareed Haque (Garaj Mahal)
- Bob Hardy (Franz Ferdinand)
- Bill Harkleroad (Captain Beefheart and his Magic Band)
- Jessica Harp (The Wreckers)
- Ben Harper
- Nick Harper
- Roy Harper
- Dhani Harrison (thenewno2)
- George Harrison (The Beatles)
- Jerry Harrison (Talking Heads)
- Mark Hart (Supertramp, Crowded House)
- Bob Hartman (Petra)
- Les Harvey (Stone the Crows)
- PJ Harvey
- Pye Hastings (Caravan)
- Charlotte Hatherley (Ash)
- Ian Haug (Powderfinger)
- Dan Hawkins (The Darkness)
- Justin Hawkins (The Darkness)
- Nick Hawkins (Big Audio Dynamite II)
- Colin Hay (Men at Work)
- Hiroyuki Hayashi (Polysics)
- Peter Hayes (Black Rebel Motorcycle Club)
- Warren Haynes (The Allman Brothers Band, Gov't Mule)
- Dave Haywood (Lady Antebellum)
- Eddie Hazel (Funkadelic)
- Pete Haycock (Climax Blues Band)
- Justin Hayward (The Moody Blues)
- Matt Heafy (Trivium)
- Jeff Healey
- Kevin Hearn (Barenaked Ladies, Kevin Hearn and Thin Buckle)
- Jim "Reverend Horton" Heath
- Charles Hedger (Cradle of Filth)
- Michael Hedges
- Christian Hejnal (Scarling.)
- Scott Henderson (Tribal Tech, Vital Tech Tones)
- Jimi Hendrix (The Jimi Hendrix Experience, Band of Gypsys, Gypsy Sun and Rainbows)
- Masato Hayakawa (Coldrain)
- Don Henley (Eagles)
- Ken Hensley
- Richard Henshall (Haken)
- James Hetfield (Metallica)
- Greg Hetson (Circle Jerks, Bad Religion)
- Nick Hexum (311)
- MJ Hibbett
- Tony Hicks
- hide (X Japan)
- Johnny Hiland
- Steve Hillage
- Tyler Hilton
- Brent Hinds (Mastodon)
- Tom Hingley (Too Much Texas, Inspiral Carpets)
- Paul Hinojos (At the Drive-In, The Mars Volta)
- Taka Hirose (Feeder)
- Joel Hoekstra (Night Ranger, Whitesnake, Rock of Ages (musical))
- Roger Hodgson (Supertramp)
- Gary Hoey
- Susanna Hoffs (The Bangles)
- Wolf Hoffmann (Accept)
- Noel Hogan (The Cranberries)
- Randy Holden
- Allan Holdsworth (U.K.)
- Dexter Holland (The Offspring)
- Justin Holland
- Buddy Holly
- Joshua Homme (Kyuss, Queens of the Stone Age)
- James Honeyman-Scott (The Pretenders)
- Matt Hoopes (Relient K)
- Mary Hopkin
- Doug Hopkins (Gin Blossoms)
- Lightnin' Hopkins
- Mark Hoppus (Blink-182, +44)
- Keith Hopwood (Herman's Hermits)
- Rita Hosking
- Emir Hot
- Tomoyasu Hotei (Boøwy)
- Jimmy Hotz
- Son House
- Michael Houser (Widespread Panic)
- Greg Howe
- Steve Howe (Tomorrow, Yes, GTR, Asia)
- Billy Howerdel (A Perfect Circle)
- Keith Howland (Chicago)
- Dann Huff
- Jesse Hughes (Eagles of Death Metal)
- Steve Hunter (Alice Cooper, Peter Gabriel)
- Mississippi John Hurt
- Wayne Hussey (The Mission, The Sisters of Mercy)
- Eric Hutchinson
- Mick Hucknall (Simply Red)
- Eugene Hütz (Gogol Bordello)
- Hyde (L'Arc-en-Ciel, VAMPS)
- Chrissie Hynde (The Pretenders)
- Susumu Hirasawa

== I ==
- Scott Ian (Anthrax, Stormtroopers of Death)
- Billy Idol
- Frank Iero (My Chemical Romance)
- James Iha (The Smashing Pumpkins, A Perfect Circle)
- Ihsahn (Emperor, Thou Shalt Suffer, Peccatum, Hardingrock)
- Chris Impellitteri (Impellitteri)
- Frank Infante (Blondie)
- Elliot Ingber (The Mothers of Invention, Captain Beefheart and his Magic Band)
- Christone "Kingfish" Ingram
- Roberto Iniesta (Extremoduro)
- Inoran (Luna Sea, Fake?, Tourbillon)
- Tony Iommi (Black Sabbath, Heaven & Hell)
- Donnie Iris
- Chris Isaak
- Jason Isbell
- Sharon Isbin
- Arve Isdal (Enslaved)
- Ernie Isley (The Isley Brothers)
- Ichiro Ito (Every Little Thing)
- Maja Ivarsson (The Sounds)
- Anders Iwers (Ceremonial Oath, In Flames, Cemetary, Lacuna Coil)

== J ==
- Matthias Jabs (Scorpions)
- Ramon Jacinto
- Alan Jackson
- Paul Jackson Jr.
- Stevie Jackson (Belle and Sebastian)
- Tito Jackson (The Jackson 5)
- Brian James (The Damned)
- Elmore James
- Skip James
- Spencer James (The Searchers)
- Tony James (Carbon/Silicon)
- Phil Jamieson (Grinspoon)
- James Williamson
- Jandek
- Bert Jansch
- Al Jardine (The Beach Boys)
- Ron Jarzombek
- Wyclef Jean
- Blind Lemon Jefferson
- Stephan Jenkins (Third Eye Blind)
- JerryC
- Joan Jett (The Runaways, Joan Jett and the Blackhearts)
- Antônio Carlos Jobim
- Heri Joensen (Týr)
- Alain Johannes (Eleven, Queens of the Stone Age)
- John 5 (Marilyn Manson, Rob Zombie)
- Daniel Johns (Silverchair)
- Carlos Johnson
- Eric Johnson
- Jack Johnson
- Jimmy Johnson (Muscle Shoals Rhythm Section)
- Kelly Johnson (Girlschool)
- Mike Johnson (Thinking Plague)
- Robert Johnson
- Vic Johnson (The BusBoys, Sammy Hagar and the Waboritas, The Circle)
- Wayne Johnson (The Manhattan Transfer)
- Wilko Johnson (Dr. Feelgood)
- Blind Willie Johnson
- Tom Johnston (The Doobie Brothers)
- Davey Johnstone (Elton John)
- Ruud Jolie (Within Temptation)
- Nick, Kevin and Joe Jonas (Jonas Brothers)
- Adam Jones (Tool)
- Buddy Jones
- Brian Jones (The Rolling Stones)
- Daniel Jones (Savage Garden)
- Danny Jones (McFly)
- Kelly Jones (Stereophonics)
- Mick Jones (Foreigner)
- Mick Jones (The Clash, Big Audio Dynamite, Carbon/Silicon)
- Rod Jones (Idlewild)
- Stacy Jones (American Hi-Fi)
- Steve Jones (Sex Pistols)
- Stanley Jordan
- Joey Jordison (Murderdolls)
- Ben Jorgensen (Armor for Sleep)
- John Jorgenson
- Juanes
- Roman Jugg (The Damned)
- Sungha Jung
- Tyler Joseph (Twenty One Pilots)

== K ==
- Ledward Kaapana
- Alex Kapranos (Franz Ferdinand)
- Andre "Virus" Karkos (Dope, Device)
- Billy Karren (Bikini Kill)
- Dr Nico Kasanda
- Terry Kath (Chicago)
- Jorma Kaukonen (Jefferson Airplane)
- Yoohei Kawakami (Alexandros)
- Ryo Kawasaki
- John Kay (Steppenwolf)
- Lenny Kaye (Patti Smith Group)
- Phil Keaggy
- Toby Keith
- Bill Kelliher (Mastodon)
- Dave Kelly (musician)
- Gary Kemp (Spandau Ballet)
- Ken Kitamura (L'Arc-en-Ciel)
- Big Kenny (Big & Rich)
- Mike Kennerty (The All American Rejects)
- Barney Kessel
- Daniel Kessler (Interpol)
- Dave Keuning (The Killers)
- Ryan Key (Yellowcard)
- Herbert Khaury (Tiny Tim)
- Jewel Kilcher
- Cheyenne Kimball (Gloriana)
- Will Kimbrough
- Albert King
- B. B. King
- Ben King (The Yardbirds)
- Dave King (Flogging Molly)
- Ed King (Lynyrd Skynyrd)
- Freddie King
- Justin King
- Kaki King
- Kerry King (Slayer)
- Donald Kinsey (Bob Marley and the Wailers, Peter Tosh)
- Bill Kirchen (Commander Cody and His Lost Planet Airmen)
- Pat Kirtley
- Ezra Koenig (Vampire Weekend)
- Kôji Kiriki (Malice Mizer, Eve of Destiny)
- Jon Klein (Siouxsie and the Banshees)
- Frank Klepacki (I AM, Home Cookin'
- Forrest Kline (hellogoodbye)
- Josh Klinghoffer (The Bicycle Thief, John Frusciante, Red Hot Chili Peppers)
- Scott Klopfenstein (Reel Big Fish, The Littlest Man Band)
- Earl Klugh
- Larry Knechtel
- David Knopfler
- Mark Knopfler (Dire Straits)
- Jeff Kollman (Bombastic Meatbats)
- George Kooymans (Golden Earring)
- Peter Koppes (The Church)
- Alexis Korner
- Paul Kostabi (White Zombie)
- Leo Kottke
- Richie Kotzen
- Rocky Kramer
- Wayne Kramer (MC5)
- Norbert Krief (Trust)
- Robby Krieger (The Doors)
- Chad Kroeger (Nickelback)
- Richard Kruspe (Rammstein)
- Andrei Krylov
- Jan Kuehnemund (Vixen)
- Damian Kulash (OK Go)
- Bruce Kulick (Kiss)
- Irina Kulikova
- Dave Kushner (Wasted Youth, Infectious Grooves, Zilch, Velvet Revolver)
- Paul Kossoff (Free)

== L ==
- Jesse Lacey (Brand New)
- Patrick Lachman (Halford, Damageplan)
- Julian Lage
- Alexi Laiho (Children of Bodom)
- Denny Laine (Paul McCartney, Wings, The Moody Blues, Ginger Baker's Air Force, Colin Blunstone)
- Greg Lake (King Crimson, Emerson, Lake & Palmer)
- Ler LaLonde (Primus)
- Shawn Lane, (Black Oak Arkansas)
- Miranda Lambert
- Paul Landers (Rammstein)
- Yuri Landman
- Michael Landau
- Jonny Lang
- Tito Larriva (The Plugz, Cruzados, Tito & Tarantula)
- Marit Larsen
- Andrew Latimer (Camel)
- Roope Latvala (Children of Bodom)
- Hugh Laurie (Fry and Laurie)
- Antonio Lauro
- Adam Lazzara (Taking Back Sunday)
- Bernie Leadon (Eagles)
- Fin Leavell (The Summer Obsession, Nightswim, Against All Authority)
- Albert Lee
- Alex Lee (Placebo)
- Alvin Lee (Ten Years After)
- Jake E. Lee
- Shane Lee (Six & Out)
- Thomas Leeb
- Troy Van Leeuwen (Queens of the Stone Age, A Perfect Circle)
- Sébastien Lefebvre (Simple Plan)
- Adrian Legg
- John Lennon (The Beatles)
- Julian Lennon
- Sean Lennon
- Stefano Lentini
- Deke Leonard (Man (band))
- Lettie
- Jared Leto (Thirty Seconds to Mars)
- Adam Levine (Maroon 5, Kara's Flowers)
- Vaden Todd Lewis (Toadies)
- Aaron Lewis (Staind)
- Bob Lewis (Devo)
- Herman Li (DragonForce)
- Ottmar Liebert
- Alex Lifeson (Rush)
- Jani Liimatainen (Cain's Offering, Sonata Arctica)
- John Lilley (The Hooters)
- Charley Lincoln
- Hal Lindes (Dire Straits)
- David Lindley
- Peter Lindgren (Opeth)
- Linde Lindström (HIM)
- Buzzy Linhart
- Jeff Linsky
- Sead Lipovača (Divlje jagode)
- Kerry Livgren (Kansas)
- Duncan Lloyd (Maxïmo Park)
- Lazer Lloyd
- Richard Lloyd (Television)
- Sophie Lloyd (Machine Gun Kelly)
- Robert Lockwood Jr.
- Chuck Loeb
- Lisa Loeb
- Pete Loeffler (Chevelle)
- Nils Lofgren (E Street Band)
- Karl Logan (Manowar)
- Kenny Loggins
- John Lombardo (10,000 Maniacs, John & Mary)
- Jeff Loomis (Nevermore, Sanctuary)
- Dang Ngoc Long
- Joe Long (The Four Seasons)
- Sami Lopakka (Sentenced)
- Courtney Love (Hole)
- Demi Lovato
- Clint Lowery (Sevendust, Dark New Day)
- Sylvain Luc
- Scott Lucas (Local H)
- Paco de Lucía
- Steve Lukather (Toto)
- Jean-Baptiste Lully
- George Lynch (Dokken, Lynch Mob (band))
- Jeff Lynne (The Move, Electric Light Orchestra, Traveling Wilburys)
- Jimmy Lyon (Eddie Money, The Greg Kihn Band)
- Bob Log III

== M ==
- Tony MacAlpine
- Alick Macheso
- Lonnie Mack
- Brian "Too Loud" MacLeod (Chilliwack, Headpins)
- Doug Macleod
- Wade MacNeil (Alexisonfire)
- Benji Madden (Good Charlotte)
- Madonna
- Jari Mäenpää (Wintersun, Ensiferum)
- Taj Mahal (musician)
- Raine Maida (Our Lady Peace)
- Wolf Mail
- Daron Malakian (System of a Down, Scars on Broadway)
- Stephen Malkmus (Pavement)
- Gui Mallon
- Yngwie Malmsteen
- Russell Malone
- Mana Mana (Moi dix Mois, Malice Mizer)
- Matteo Mancuso
- Harvey Mandel (Canned Heat)
- James Mankey (Concrete Blonde)
- Phil Manzanera (Roxy Music)
- Kee Marcello (Easy Action, Europe, Kee Marcello's K2)
- Carlo Marchione
- Frank Marino (Mahogany Rush)
- Steve Marker (Garbage)
- Bob Marley (Bob Marley and the Wailers)
- Del Marquis (Scissor Sisters)
- Johnny Marr (The Smiths, Modest Mouse)
- Steve Marriott (Small Faces, Humble Pie)
- Mick Mars (Mötley Crüe)
- Bernie Marsden (UFO (band), Whitesnake)
- Gerry Marsden (Gerry and the Pacemakers)
- James Marsters
- Chris Martin (Coldplay)
- Jeff Martin (The Tea Party)
- Jim Martin (Faith No More)
- Pat Martino
- Dave Martone
- John Martyn
- Hank Marvin (The Shadows)
- J Mascis (Dinosaur Jr.)
- James Maslow
- Brent Mason
- Dave Mason
- Lucio Matarazzo
- Tak Matsumoto (B'z)
- Dave Matthews (Dave Matthews Band)
- Lee Mavers (The La's)
- Brian May (Queen)
- John Mayer
- Sonny Mayo (Snot, Hed PE, Amen, Sevendust)
- Steve Mazur (Our Lady Peace)
- Nick McCabe (The Verve)
- Ian McCallum (Stiff Little Fingers)
- John McCarthy
- Nick McCarthy (Franz Ferdinand)
- Paul McCartney (The Beatles), (Wings)
- Chris McCaughan (The Lawrence Arms)
- George McConnell (Beanland, Kudzu Kings, Widespread Panic)
- Andy McCoy (Hanoi Rocks)
- Hugh McCracken
- Mike McCready (Pearl Jam)
- Danny McCulloch (The Animals)
- Jimmy McCulloch (Wings, Thunderclap Newman, Stone the Crows, Small Faces, The Dukes)
- Henry McCullough (Éire Apparent, the Grease Band, Spooky Tooth, Wings)
- Jennette McCurdy
- Richie McDonald
- Mississippi Fred McDowell
- Eric McFadden (Eric Burdon)
- John McFee (The Doobie Brothers, Southern Pacific)
- John McGeoch (Magazine, Visage, Siouxsie and the Banshees, Public Image Ltd, The Armoury Show)
- Brownie McGhee
- Tim McGraw
- Roger McGuinn (The Byrds)
- Tim McIlrath (Rise Against)
- James McIlroy (Cradle of Filth)
- Duff McKagan (Guns N' Roses, Velvet Revolver, Neurotic Outsiders)
- Al McKay (Earth, Wind & Fire)
- John McKay (Siouxsie and the Banshees)
- Andy McKee
- Sarah McLachlan
- John McLaughlin (Mahavishnu Orchestra)
- Troy McLawhorn (Dark New Day, Evanescence)
- Tony McManus
- El McMeen
- John McNally (The Searchers)
- Tony McPhee (The Groundhogs)
- Michelle Meldrum (Phantom Blue, Meldrum)
- Colin Meloy (The Decemberists)
- Katie Melua
- Eric Melvin (NOFX)
- Wendy Melvoin
- Shawn Mendes
- Johann Kaspar Mertz
- Italo Meschi
- Memphis Minnie
- Eddie Mesa
- Naser Mestarihi
- Pat Metheny (Pat Metheny Group)
- Jesse Michaels (Operation Ivy, Common Rider)
- Alyson Michalka (78violet)
- Amanda Michalka (78violet)
- Darren Middleton (Powderfinger)
- Qaasim Middleton (Nat & Alex Wolff)
- Radomir Mihailović (Smak)
- Tomo Miličević (Thirty Seconds to Mars)
- Amy Millan (Stars)
- Deron Miller (CKY)
- Dan Miller (Lincoln, They Might Be Giants)
- Dominic Miller (Phil Collins)
- Jerry Miller (Moby Grape)
- Marcus Miller
- Roger Miller (Mission of Burma)
- Steve Miller (Steve Miller Band)
- Nuno Mindelis
- Ben Mink
- Federico Miranda (Gandhi)
- Roman Miroshnichenko
- Tom Misch
- Joni Mitchell
- Kim Mitchell
- Miyavi (Skin)
- Jim Moginie (Midnight Oil)
- Brian Molko (Placebo)
- MonaLisa Twins
- Michael Monarch (Steppenwolf)
- Erik Mongrain
- Wes Montgomery
- Carlos Montoya
- Ronnie Montrose (Montrose, Gamma)
- Ben Moody (Evanescence)
- Gary Moore (Thin Lizzy, Skid Row)
- Nathan Moore (Surprise Me Mr. Davis, ThaMuseMeant)
- Scotty Moore
- Thurston Moore (Sonic Youth)
- Vinnie Moore (UFO), (Vicious Rumors)
- Craig Morgan
- Shaun Morgan (Seether)
- Rafael Moreira
- Tom Morello (Rage Against the Machine, Audioslave, The Nightwatchman)
- Marc Moreland (Wall of Voodoo, The Skulls)
- Chino Moreno (Deftones)
- Ruthie Morris (Magnapop)
- Sterling Morrison (The Velvet Underground)
- Steve Morse (Dixie Dregs, Kansas, Deep Purple)
- Howard Moss
- Jason Moss (Cherry Poppin' Daddies)
- Bob Mothersbaugh (Devo)
- Bob Mould (Hüsker Dü)
- Xavier Moyano
- Jason Mraz
- Alonso Mudarra
- Maury Muehleisen
- Cameron Muncey (Jet)
- Billy Mure
- James Murphy (Death, Testament)
- Matt "Guitar" Murphy
- Dave Mustaine (Megadeth, Metallica)
- Dave Murray (Iron Maiden)
- Brad Myers
- Zach Myers (Shinedown)
- Gary Myrick (Havana 3am)

== N ==
- Jimmy Nail
- Miyu Nagase (Zone)
- Randy Napoleon
- Graham Nash (Crosby, Stills, Nash & Young)
- Dave Navarro (Jane's Addiction, Red Hot Chili Peppers, The Panic Channel, Camp Freddy)
- Joe Negri
- Simon Neil (Biffy Clyro, Marmaduke Duke)
- Ricky Nelson
- Willie Nelson
- Michael Nesmith (The Monkees)
- Mike Ness (Social Distortion)
- Ira Newborn
- Carl Newman (The New Pornographers)
- Grant Nicholas (Feeder)
- Craig Nicholls (The Vines)
- Warren Nicholson
- Rick Nielsen (Cheap Trick)
- Willie Nile
- John Nolan (Straylight Run, Taking Back Sunday)
- Noodle (Gorillaz)
- Noodles (The Offspring)
- Paul Noonan (Bell X1)
- Aaron North (The Icarus Line, Nine Inch Nails)
- John Norum (Europe, Dokken)
- Bradley Nowell (Sublime)
- Ted Nugent (The Amboy Dukes, Damn Yankees)

== O ==
- Ed O'Brien (Radiohead)
- Mark O'Connor
- Richard Oakes (Suede)
- John Oates (Hall & Oates)
- Ric Ocasek (The Cars)
- Frank Ocean
- Erkan Oğur
- Eddie Ojeda (Twisted Sister)
- Kele Okereke (Bloc Party)
- André Olbrich (Blind Guardian)
- Mike Oldfield
- Criss Oliva (Savatage)
- Stefan Olsdal (Placebo)
- Ami Onuki (Puffy AmiYumi)
- Jason Orange (Take That)
- Roy Orbison
- Orianthi
- Marc Orrell (Dropkick Murphys)
- Jim O'Rourke
- Roland Orzabal (Tears for Fears)
- Buzz Osborne (Melvins, Venomous Concept)
- Emily Osment
- Steve Ouimette
- Ryo Owatari (Do As Infinity, Missile Innovation)

== P ==
- Niccolò Paganini
- Jimmy Page (The Yardbirds, Led Zeppelin, The Firm)
- Steven Page (Barenaked Ladies, The Vanity Project)
- Clive Painter (Broken Dog, The 99 Call, Tram (band), The Real Tuesday Weld)
- Brad Paisley
- Orianthi Panagaris
- Jett Pangan (The Dawn)
- Paulinho Nogueira
- Richard Palmer (Supertramp)
- Rick Parfitt (Status Quo)
- Jeff Parker (Tortoise)
- Ray Parker Jr.
- Charlie Parra del Riego
- Russ Parrish (Steel Panther)
- Andy Partridge (XTC)
- Joe Pass
- Pata (X Japan)
- Lucy Patané
- Ralph Patt
- Pappo
- Les Paul
- Tom Paxton
- Ryan Peake (Nickelback)
- Jeff Pearce (Hearts of Space, William Ackerman)
- Paco Peña
- Mike Pender (The Searchers)
- Kirk Pengilly (INXS)
- Patrick Pentland (Sloan)
- Raymond "East Bay Ray" Pepperell (Dead Kennedys)
- Heitor Teixeira Pereira (Simply Red)
- Franky Perez (Scars on Broadway)
- Andreas Paolo Perger
- Carl Perkins
- Luther Perkins (The Tennessee Three)
- Christina Perri
- Joe Perry (Aerosmith, The Joe Perry Project)
- Katy Perry
- Linda Perry (4 Non Blondes)
- Eric Peterson (Testament)
- Vicki Peterson (The Bangles)
- John Petrucci (Dream Theater)
- Tom Petty (Tom Petty and the Heartbreakers, Traveling Wilburys)
- Dave Peverett (Foghat)
- Liz Phair
- River Phoenix (Aleka's Attic)
- Jonny Phillips (musician) (Oriole)
- Anthony Phillips (Genesis)
- Yannis Philippakis (Foals)
- Yosi Piamenta (Yosi Piamenta)
- Frank Pilato
- Dave Pino (Andrew W.K., Waltham (band), Damone (band), Powerman 5000)
- Al Pitrelli (Savatage, Trans-Siberian Orchestra, Asia, Megadeth)
- Jake Pitts (Black Veil Brides)
- Bucky Pizzarelli
- Serge Pizzorno (Kasabian)
- Joel Plaskett (Thrush Hermit, Joel Plaskett Emergency)
- Dean Pleasants (Suicidal Tendencies)
- Morris Pleasure (Sideman)
- Plini
- Chris Poland (Megadeth)
- Nick Pollock (Alice N' Chains, My Sister's Machine)
- Alberto Ponce
- Iggy Pop
- Ana Popović
- Jody Porter (Fountains of Wayne)
- Michael Poulsen (Dominus, Volbeat)
- Andy Powell (Wishbone Ash)
- Baden Powell
- Chet Powers (Quicksilver Messenger Service)
- Kid Congo Powers (The Gun Club, The Cramps, Nick Cave and the Bad Seeds)
- Michael Powers
- Dougie Poynter (McFly)
- Sam Prekop (The Sea and Cake)
- Elvis Presley
- Igor Presnyakov (Iggypres)
- Prince
- Jade Puget (Redemption 87, AFI)
- Martin Pugh (Steamhammer, Armageddon, 7th Order)
- Gian Pyres (Cradle of Filth)

== Q ==
- Robert Quine (Lou Reed)

== R ==
- Raphael Rabello
- Ronald Radford
- Eddie Rabbitt
- Trevor Rabin (Yes)
- Gerry Rafferty
- Melvin "Wah-Wah Watson" Ragin
- Bonnie Raitt
- Mick Ralphs (Mott the Hoople, Bad Company)
- Eros Ramazzotti
- Johnny Ramone (Ramones)
- Federico Ramos
- Larry Ramos (The Association)
- Lee Ranaldo (Sonic Youth)
- Elliott Randall
- Jimmy Raney
- Søren Rasted (Aqua)
- Marion Raven
- Chris Rea
- Ray Reach
- Jaret Reddick (Bowling for Soup)
- Dusty Redmon
- Lou Reed (The Velvet Underground)
- Preston Reed
- Vernon Reid (Living Colour)
- William Reid (The Jesus and Mary Chain)
- Vini Reilly (The Durutti Column)
- Django Reinhardt
- Keith Relf (Renaissance)
- Emily Remler
- John Renbourn
- Tim Renwick (Al Stewart)
- Marco Restrepo
- Paul Reynolds (A Flock of Seagulls)
- Sheldon Reynolds (Commodores, Earth, Wind & Fire)
- Tim Reynolds (TR3, Dave Matthews Band)
- Trent Reznor (Nine Inch Nails)
- Randy Rhoads (Quiet Riot, Ozzy Osbourne)
- Red Rhodes
- Marc Ribot (Tom Waits, The Lounge Lizards)
- Damien Rice
- Tony Rice
- John Rich (Lonestar, Big & Rich)
- Cliff Richard
- Keith Richards (The Rolling Stones)
- Max Richards (The Bonfire of the Vanities)
- Gary Richrath (REO Speedwagon)
- Michael Ricketts
- Mike Riggs (Rob Zombie, Scum of the Earth)
- Marc Riley (The Fall)
- Rafael Riqueni
- Lee Ritenour
- Jesse Rivest
- Janet Robin
- Jason Roberts (Norah Jones, Hymns (band), The Candles)
- Allison Robertson (The Donnas)
- Brian Robertson (Thin Lizzy, Motörhead)
- Ed Robertson (Barenaked Ladies)
- Robbie Robertson (The Band)
- Rowan Robertson (Dio, Bang Tango
- Rich Robinson (The Black Crowes)
- Andrea Rocca
- Nile Rodgers
- Olivia Rodrigo
- Flavio Rodrigues
- Silvio Rodríguez
- Omar Rodríguez-López (At the Drive-In, De Facto, The Mars Volta)
- Donald "Buck Dharma" Roeser (Blue Öyster Cult)
- Roy Rogers (singing cowboy)
- Roy Rogers (slide guitarist)
- Lawson Rollins
- Tony Rombola (Godsmack)
- Michael Romeo (Symphony X)
- Pepe Romero
- Joe Romersa
- Ludovico Roncalli
- Patrick Rondat (Jean-Michel Jarre, Elegy)
- Mick Ronson (David Bowie)
- Joe Don Rooney (Rascal Flatts)
- Jim Root (Slipknot, Stone Sour)
- Axl Rose
- Kurt Rosenwinkel
- Andy Ross (OK Go)
- Don Ross
- Ryan Ross (The Young Veins, Panic! at the Disco)
- Gavin Rossdale (Bush, Institute)
- Francis Rossi (Status Quo)
- Gary Rossington (Lynyrd Skynyrd)
- Robert Roth (Truly)
- Uli Jon Roth (Scorpions)
- Steve Rothery (Marillion, The Wishing Tree)
- Martin Rotsey (Midnight Oil)
- Andy Rourke
- Ellie Rowsell (Wolf Alice)
- Spookey Ruben
- Darius Rucker (Hootie & the Blowfish)
- Javier Ruibal
- Todd Rundgren (Nazz, Utopia, The New Cars)
- Otis Rush
- David Russell
- Kamil Rustam
- Erik Rutan (Hate Eternal)
- Mike Rutherford (Genesis, Mike + The Mechanics)
- Terje Rypdal
- Johnny Rzeznik (Goo Goo Dolls)

== S ==
- St. Vincent (musician)
- Sabicas
- Greg Sage (Wipers)
- Maggie Sajak
- Flavio Sala
- Stevie Salas (George Clinton)
- Richie Sambora (Bon Jovi)
- Samoth (Emperor, Thou Shalt Suffer, Arcturus, Satyricon, Zyklon-B, Zyklon, Scum)
- Claudio Sanchez (Coheed and Cambria)
- Justin Sandercoe
- Justin Sane (Anti-Flag)
- Manolo Sanlúcar
- Carlos Santana (Santana)
- Adam Sandler
- Tommy Sands (American singer)
- Tommy Sands (Irish singer)
- Giuliano Sangiorgi (Negramaro)
- Joey Santiago (Pixies, The Martinis)
- Blues Saraceno
- Yağmur Sarıgül (maNga)
- Satchel (Steel Panther)
- Manabu Satô (Malice Mizer, Moi dix Mois)
- Joe Satriani (Chickenfoot)
- Boz Scaggs (Steve Miller Band)
- Matt Scannell (Vertical Horizon)
- Craig Scanlon (The Fall)
- Roger Scannura
- Wes Scantlin (Puddle of Mudd)
- Jon Schaffer (Iced Earth)
- Kendall Schmidt
- Marcus Siepen (Blind Guardian)
- Michael Schenker
- Rudolf Schenker (Scorpions)
- Helge Schneider
- Al Schnier (moe.)
- Tom Scholz (Boston)
- Neal Schon (Journey, Santana, Bad English)
- Chuck Schuldiner (Death, Control Denied, Voodoocult)
- Knut Schreiner (Euroboy)
- Robert Schwartzman (Rooney)
- Blake Schwarzenbach (Jawbreaker, Jets to Brazil)
- John Scofield
- Andy Scott (Sweet)
- Dominic Scott (Keane)
- Howard E. Scott (War)
- Keith Scott (Bryan Adams)
- Bob Seger
- Andrés Segovia
- John Sekula (Mushroomhead, State of Conviction)
- Anna Sentina
- Gabe Serbian (Cattle Decapitation, Holy Molar)
- Wayne Sermon (Imagine Dragons)
- Juan Serrano
- Leo Setiawan (Kekal)
- Brian Setzer (Stray Cats, The Brian Setzer Orchestra)
- Charlie Sexton
- James Shaffer (Korn)
- Del Shannon
- Tommy Shannon
- Dave Sharp (The Alarm, Stiff Little Fingers)
- Elliott Sharp
- Todd Sharpville
- Kim Shattuck (The Muffs, The Pandoras)
- Tommy Shaw (Styx, Damn Yankees)
- Ed Sheeran
- Pete Shelley (Buzzcocks)
- Blake Shelton
- Louis Shelton
- Kenny Wayne Shepherd
- Nick Sheppard (The Cortinas, The Clash, Head)
- Rodney Sheppard (Sugar Ray)
- Rabbi Shergill
- Jeff Sherman (Glass)
- Billy Sherwood
- Kevin Shields (My Bloody Valentine)
- Scott Shields (The Mescaleros)
- Chris Shiflett (No Use for a Name, Me First and the Gimme Gimmes, Foo Fighters)
- Mike Shinoda (Linkin Park)
- Masaki Shirai (Alexandros)
- Jon Siebels (Eve 6)
- Alejandro Silva
- Patrick Simmons (The Doobie Brothers)
- Charlie Simpson (Fightstar)
- Matt Skiba (Alkaline Trio)
- Tim Sköld (Marilyn Manson)
- Alex Skolnick (Testament, Savatage, Trans-Siberian Orchestra)
- Skwisgaar Skwigelf (Dethklok)
- Acey Slade (Trashlight Vision, Dope, Murderdolls)
- Mike Slamer (City Boy)
- Slash (Guns N' Roses, Slash's Snakepit, Velvet Revolver, Slash's Blues Ball, Road Crew)
- Martin Slattery (The Mescaleros)
- Hillel Slovak (Red Hot Chili Peppers, What Is This?)
- Brendon Small
- Pat Smear (Germs, Nirvana, Foo Fighters)
- Adrian Smith (Iron Maiden)
- Bennie Smith
- Elliott Smith
- Fred "Sonic" Smith (MC5, Sonic's Rendezvous Band)
- G. E. Smith (Hall & Oates)
- Johnny Smith
- Keith Smith
- Kenn Smith
- Mindy Smith
- Patti Smith
- Paul Smith (Maxïmo Park)
- Robert Smith (The Cure, Siouxsie and the Banshees)
- Tom Smothers
- Toti Soler
- Fernando Sor
- Donita Sparks (L7)
- Jordin Sparks
- Larry Sparks (The Stanley Brothers, Clinch Mountain Boys)
- Tim Sparks
- Chris Spedding
- Bob Spencer (Skyhooks), (The Angels)
- Mary Spender
- Spirit
- Dan Spitz (Anthrax)
- Bill Spooner (The Tubes)
- Rick Springfield
- Bruce Springsteen (Bruce Springsteen and the E Street Band)
- Trey Spruance (Mr. Bungle, Secret Chiefs 3, Faith No More)
- Lester Square (The Monochrome Set)
- Billy Squier
- John Squire (The Stone Roses)
- Kapil Srivastava
- David St. Hubbins (Spinal Tap)
- Layne Staley (Alice in Chains)
- Mark Stanley
- Paul Stanley (KISS)
- Mikael Stanne)
- Jack Starr
- Wayne Static (Static-X)
- Tommy Steele
- Vlatko Stefanovski (Leb i sol)
- Chris Stein (Blondie)
- Ken Steorts (Skillet)
- Leigh Stephens (Blue Cheer, Foxtrot)
- Edward Stephenson
- Mike Stern (Blood, Sweat & Tears)
- Travis Stever (Coheed and Cambria)
- Cat Stevens
- Rogers Stevens (Blind Melon)
- Steve Stevens (Billy Idol)
- James Stevenson
- Al Stewart
- Allan Stewart (Idlewild)
- Eric Stewart (10cc, The Mindbenders, Hotlegs)
- John Stewart (The Kingston Trio)
- Rod Stewart (The Jeff Beck Group, The Faces)
- Stephen Stills (Buffalo Springfield, Crosby, Stills, Nash & Young)
- Bob Stinson (The Replacements)
- Andrew Stockdale (Wolfmother)
- Barry Stock (Three Days Grace)
- Jason Stollsteimer (The Von Bondies)
- Freddie Stone (Sly and the Family Stone)
- Mike Stone (Queensrÿche)
- Izzy Stradlin (Guns N' Roses)
- George Strait
- Nita Strauss (As Blood Runs Black, Femme Fatale, The Iron Maidens, Demi Lovato, Alice Cooper)
- Emily Strayer (The Chicks)
- Joel Stroetzel (Killswitch Engage)
- Jesper Strömblad (In Flames)
- Joe Strummer (The Clash)
- Daryl Stuermer (Genesis, Phil Collins)
- Joe Stump
- Patrick Stump (Fall Out Boy)
- Ron Strykert (Men at Work)
- Alex Suarez (Cobra Starship)
- Sugizo (Luna Sea, S.K.I.N., X Japan)
- Frankie Sullivan (Survivor)
- Big Jim Sullivan
- Hubert Sumlin (Howlin' Wolf)
- Andy Summers (Eric Burdon & The Animals), (The Police)
- Bernard Sumner (Joy Division, New Order)
- Øystein Sunde
- Niklas Sundin (Dark Tranquillity)
- Bryan Sutton
- Peter Svensson (The Cardigans)
- Dan Swanö
- Steve Swanson
- Matthew Sweet
- Michael Sweet (Stryper)
- Taylor Swift
- Rob Swire (Pendulum, Knife Party)
- Jussi Sydänmaa (Lordi)
- John Sykes (Thin Lizzy, Whitesnake)
- Ken Sykora
- Red Symons (Skyhooks)
- Gábor Szabó
- Tony Sly (No Use For A Name)

== T ==
- Ty Tabor (King's X)
- Toquinho
- Fred Tackett (Little Feat)
- Joey Tafolla (Jag Panzer)
- Akira Takasaki (Loudness)
- Serj Tankian
- Marv Tarplin (The Supremes, The Miracles)
- Francisco Tárrega
- Evan Taubenfeld (Avril Lavigne)
- Andy Taylor (Duran Duran)
- Corey Taylor (Stone Sour)
- Courtney Taylor-Taylor (The Dandy Warhols)
- Graeme Taylor (Gryphon)
- Joanne Shaw Taylor
- John Taylor (Duran Duran)
- Martin Taylor
- Melvin Taylor
- Mick Taylor (John Mayall & the Bluesbreakers, The Rolling Stones)
- Otis Taylor
- Ryan Tedder (OneRepublic)
- Susan Tedeschi
- Bobby Tench (Hummingbird A&M)
- Miika Tenkula (Sentenced)
- Octave Octavian Teodorescu
- Teye
- Thomas Thacker (Gob, Sum 41)
- Ron "Bumblefoot" Thal (Guns N' Roses)
- Kim Thayil (Soundgarden)
- Sister Rosetta Tharpe
- Tommy Thayer (Kiss)
- Toots Thielemans
- Amy Thiessen
- Matt Thiessen (Relient K, Matthew Thiessen and the Earthquakes)
- Lynda Thomas
- Randy Thomas (musician) (Sweet Comfort Band, Allies)
- Rob Thomas (Matchbox Twenty)
- Hughie Thomasson (Outlaws)
- Porl Thompson (The Cure)
- Richard Thompson (Fairport Convention)
- Mick Thomson (Slipknot)
- Ian Thornley (Thornley, Big Wreck)
- Blair Thornton (Bachman–Turner Overdrive)
- George Thorogood
- Johnny Thunders (The Heartbreakers)
- Glenn Tilbrook (Squeeze)
- Andy Timmons (Danger Danger)
- Glenn Tipton (Judas Priest)
- Paul Tobias (Guns N' Roses)
- Timo Tolkki (Stratovarius)
- Tomatito
- Simon Tong (The Verve, The Good, the Bad & the Queen)
- Peter Tork (The Monkees)
- Ray Toro (My Chemical Romance)
- Sam Totman (DragonForce)
- Ralph Towner (Oregon)
- Mark Lee Townsend (DC Talk)
- Devin Townsend (Strapping Young Lad, The Devin Townsend Band)
- Pete Townshend (The Who)
- Simon Townshend (The Who, Casbah Club)
- Pat Travers
- Merle Travis
- Randy Travis
- Mark Tremonti (Alter Bridge, Creed)
- Joseph Trohman (Fall Out Boy)
- John Tropea
- Robin Trower (Procol Harum)
- Derek Trucks (The Allman Brothers Band, The Derek Trucks Band)
- Nicholas Tse
- Corin Tucker (Heavens to Betsy, Sleater-Kinney)
- Nigel Tufnel (Spinal Tap)
- KT Tunstall
- Luca Turilli (Rhapsody of Fire)
- John Turnbull (The Blockheads)
- Alex Turner (Arctic Monkeys)
- Ike Turner (Kings of Rhythm, Ike & Tina Turner Revue)
- Mike Turner (Our Lady Peace, Fair Ground)
- Josh Turner
- Joshua Lee Turner
- Steve Turner (Mudhoney, Green River)
- Tweet (singer)
- Dan Tyminski (Alison Krauss)

== U ==
- Keith Urban (The Ranch)
- Brendon Urie (Panic! at the Disco)
- Midge Ure (Slik, Rich Kids, Thin Lizzy, Ultravox, Visage)
- Farin Urlaub (Die Ärzte, Soilent Grün, King Køng)
- Björn Ulvaeus (ABBA)

== V ==
- Steve Vai (Frank Zappa, Alcatrazz, Whitesnake)
- Adrian Vandenberg (Vandenberg, Whitesnake)
- Pierre Van Dormael
- George Van Eps
- Eddie Van Halen (Van Halen)
- Steve Van Zandt (E Street Band)
- Donnie Van Zant (38 Special)
- Ritchie Valens
- Nick Valensi (The Strokes)
- Hilton Valentine (The Animals)
- James Valentine (Maroon 5)
- Sergio Vallín (Maná)
- Randy VanWarmer
- Mike Varney (Outlaws)
- Jimmie Vaughan
- Stevie Ray Vaughan (Stevie Ray Vaughan and Double Trouble)
- Eddie Vedder (Pearl Jam)
- Suzanne Vega
- Virginia Vera
- John Verity (Argent, Charlie)
- Tom Verlaine (Television)
- Henry Vestine (Canned Heat)
- Ana Vidović
- Viktor Vidović
- Brian Viglione (The Dresden Dolls, The World/Inferno Friendship Society)
- Frank Vignola
- Elias Viljanen (Sonata Arctica)
- Jacky Vincent (Falling In Reverse)
- Vinnie Vincent (KISS)
- Lee Ving (Fear)
- Kate Voegele
- Mark Volman
- Cody Votolato (The Blood Brothers)
- Rocky Votolato (Waxwing)
- Emppu Vuorinen (Nightwish)

== W ==
- Paul Waaktaar-Savoy (a-ha)
- Waddy Wachtel
- Jason Wade (Lifehouse)
- Paul Waggoner (Between the Buried and Me)
- Rufus Wainwright
- Dave Wakeling (The Beat, General Public)
- Patrick Walden (Babyshambles)
- Billy Walker
- Butch Walker
- David T. Walker
- Geordie Walker (Killing Joke)
- Jon Walker (The Young Veins, Panic! at the Disco)
- T-Bone Walker
- Chris Walla (Death Cab for Cutie)
- John Bruce Wallace
- Gordon Waller (Peter and Gordon)
- Denny Walley (The Mothers of Invention, Captain Beefheart and his Magic Band, Frank Zappa)
- Joe Walsh (James Gang, Eagles)
- Rich Ward (Fozzy)
- Baz Warne (The Stranglers)
- Sean Watkins (Nickel Creek)
- Doc Watson
- Jeff Watson (Night Ranger)
- Stan Webb (Chicken Shack)
- Michael Weber
- Tim Weed
- Dean Ween (Ween)
- Gene Ween (Ween)
- John Weider (Eric Burdon & The Animals)
- Dave Weiner (Steve Vai)
- Jona Weinhofen (I Killed The Prom Queen, Bring Me the Horizon, Bleeding Through)
- Bob Weir (Grateful Dead)
- Bob Welch (Fleetwood Mac)
- Brian Welch (Korn)
- Bruce Welch (The Shadows)
- Paul Weller (The Jam, The Style Council)
- John Wesley (Porcupine Tree)
- Leslie West (Mountain)
- Jim West ("Weird Al" Yankovic)
- Robert Westerholt (Within Temptation)
- Tim Wheeler (Ash)
- Deryck Whibley (Sum 41)
- Andrew White (Kaiser Chiefs)
- Bukka White
- Charles White (The Gentle Men)
- Clarence White (The Kentucky Colonels, Nashville West, The Byrds, Muleskinner)
- Jack White (The White Stripes, The Raconteurs)
- Jason White (Green Day, Pinhead Gunpowder)
- Josh White
- Peter White
- Snowy White (Thin Lizzy, Pink Floyd, Roger Waters, David Gilmour)
- Tony Joe White
- Brad Whitford (Aerosmith)
- Slim Whitman
- John "Charlie" Whitney (Family, Streetwalkers)
- Jonny Wickersham (Youth Brigade, U.S. Bombs, Social Distortion)
- Jane Wiedlin (The Go-Go's)
- Clarence Wijewardena
- David Wilcox
- Harlow Wilcox
- Webb Wilder
- Jack Wilkins
- Brad Allen Williams
- Bernie Williams
- Hayley Williams (Paramore)
- Jody Williams
- John Williams
- Mason Williams
- Rich Williams (Kansas)
- Pete Willis (Def Leppard)
- Marty Willson-Piper (The Church)
- Alan Wilson (Canned Heat)
- Carl Wilson (The Beach Boys)
- Nancy Wilson (Heart)
- Steven Wilson (Porcupine Tree, No-Man, Blackfield)
- Michael Wilton (Queensrÿche, Soulbender)
- Johnny Winter
- Steve Winwood (The Spencer Davis Group, Traffic, Blind Faith, Go)
- Christian Olde Wolbers (Fear Factory)
- Howlin' Wolf
- Bobby Womack
- Cory Wong
- Wong Ka Kui (Beyond)
- Paul Wong (Beyond)
- Sigurd Wongraven (Satyricon)
- Ronnie Wood (Small Faces, The Jeff Beck Group, The Rolling Stones)
- Bob Wootton (The Tennessee Three)
- Link Wray
- Owen Wright (Mistrust, My Sister's Machine)
- Zakk Wylde (Pride & Glory, Black Label Society, Ozzy Osbourne)

== X ==
- Phil X (Bon Jovi)

== Y ==
- Kyoji Yamamoto (Bow Wow)
- Kazuhito Yamashita
- Zal Yanovsky (Lovin' Spoonful)
- Narciso Yepes
- Jim Yester (The Association)
- Taylor York (Paramore)
- Thom Yorke (Radiohead)
- Pete Yorn
- Angus Young (AC/DC)
- James "JY" Young (Styx)
- Jeff Young (Megadeth)
- Malcolm Young (AC/DC)
- Neil Young (Buffalo Springfield, Crosby, Stills, Nash & Young)
- Yvette Young (Covet)
- YUI
- Yael Yuzon (Sponge Cola)

== Z ==
- Roy Z (Rob Rock, Bruce Dickinson)
- Buddy Zabala (Eraserheads, The Dawn)
- Aamir Zaki
- Robin Zander (Cheap Trick)
- Dweezil Zappa
- Frank Zappa (The Mothers of Invention)
- Roy Zimmerman
- Drew Zingg
- Nick Zinner (Yeah Yeah Yeahs)
- Billy Zoom (X)

== See also ==
- List of bass guitarists
- List of classical guitarists
- List of jazz guitarists
- List of lead guitarists
- List of rhythm guitarists
- List of slide guitarists
