= Eveland =

Eveland is a surname. Notable people with the surname include:

- Dana Eveland (born 1983), American baseball player
- Dennis Eveland (born 1952), American guitarist and electronic musician
- Wilbur Crane Eveland (1918–1990), American CIA station chief
- William Perry Eveland (1864–1916), American Methodist bishop
