= Kovner =

Kovner is a surname of Yiddish origin, meaning "a person from the city of Kovne" (now Kaunas Lithuania).

- Abba Kovner (1918–1987), Israeli poet and World War II partisan
- Meir Vilner (1918–2003), born Ber Kovner, Israeli politician
- Bruce Kovner (born 1945), American businessman
- Rachel Kovner (born 1979), American judge
- Elyasaf Kowner (born 1970), Israeli artist
- Rotem Kowner (born 1960), Israeli historian and psychologist

== See also ==
- Kovner–Besicovitch measure, named after mathematician S. S. Kovner
