= Presnyakov =

Presnyakov (feminine: Presnyakova) is a Russian-language surname. It may refer to:

- Presnyakov brothers
- Alexander Presnyakov
- Igor Presnyakov
- M. Presnyakov (born 1968), Russian artist
- Vladimir Presnyakov Jr. (born 1968), Russian musician, actor and composer
- Vladimir Presnyakov Sr. (born 1946), Russian musician and composer
- Yelena Presnyakova (born 1946) Russian singer
