= Bang That Bell =

Studio album by Melvin Taylor
- Released: 1999
- Studio: Ardent
- Genre: Blues
- Label: Evidence
- Producer: John Snyder

Melvin Taylor chronology
Dirty Pool (1997)	Bang That Bell (1999)	Rendezvous with the Blues (2002)

Bang That Bell is an album by the American musician Melvin Taylor, released in 2000. He is credited with the Slack Band. Taylor supported the album with a North American tour.

== Production ==
Produced by John Snyder, the album was recorded at Ardent Studios, in Memphis. Though mostly blues, it is marked by more prominent jazz, funk, and rock influences. Eric Gales played guitar on the album; Sugar Blue played harmonica. "Trick Bag" is a cover of the Earl King song. "If You're Goin' to the City" was written by Mose Allison. "Even Trolls Love Rock & Roll" is a cover of the Tony Joe White tune; "A Quitter Never Wins" is by Tinsley Ellis.

== Critical reception ==
Professional ratings
Review scores
Source	Rating
AllMusic	3/5 stars
DownBeat	3/5 stars
The Encyclopedia of Popular Music	3/5 stars
The Penguin Guide to Blues Recordings	2.5/4 stars

JazzTimes noted that "for sheer guitar heroics and fretboard flash, it’s hard to beat Melvin Taylor." The Daily Herald opined: "With its cartoonish cover artwork and more party-oriented songs, it sounds specifically tailored to a rock audience impressed by more bland guitar technicians like Kenny Wayne Shepherd." The Star Tribune determined that Taylor's "funk is fiery and fertile, his rock is about punch and substance rather than idle flash, and his jazz detours are potent and legit."

The Toronto Star wrote that "a galloping four-piece group primes Taylor continuously, Norris Johnston making keyboards wail hard, and the boss ... is quick, uses the axe's full range and specializes in hard-bent notes." The Detroit Free Press determined that "Bang That Bell sees him inching closer to Robert Cray territory, where blues meets soul for some serious storytelling." The Dispatch–Argus opined that the Slack Band "are as tight as any band around."

AllMusic wrote that "Taylor is undoubtedly blues-oriented, but his music is also fueled by bursts of jazz, R&B, funk, and distorted wah-wah-inflected rock."

== Track listing ==
No.	Title	Length
1.	"Bang That Bell"
2.	"Love Is a Gamble"
3.	"Another Bad Day"
4.	"It's Later Than You Think"
5.	"My Life"
6.	"Trick Bag"
7.	"If You're Goin' to the City"
8.	"Don't Cloud Up on Me"
9.	"A Quitter Never Wins"
10.	"Even Trolls Love Rock & Roll"
