= A Single Drop of Red =

EP by Anarchy Club
- Released: December 20, 2007
- Recorded: 2006–2007
- Genre: Alternative rock, electronica, industrial rock, experimental rock, alternative metal, post-grunge
- Length: 40:55
- Label: Independent

Anarchy Club chronology
The Way and Its Power (2005)	A Single Drop of Red (2007)	The Art of War (2009)

Professional ratings
Review scores
Source	Rating
Allmusic	3.5/5 stars

A Single Drop of Red is the first EP and second release overall by the hard rock/electronica duo Anarchy Club, released in December 2007.

The EP features the two already released tracks "Collide" (from Guitar Hero II in 2006), and "Blood Doll" (from Rock Band in 2007), three all new unreleased songs, and six new remixes to six of the songs from the band's debut LP, The Way and Its Power.

== Track listing ==
All songs written by Keith Smith and Adam von Buhler, except "No You Don't" by Chapman & Chinn.

1. "Graveyard Stickshift" – 2:55
2. "Collide" – 3:15
3. "Blood Doll" – 2:30
4. "A Single Drop of Red" – 4:12
5. "No You Don't" – 3:27
6. "Interlude" – 0:18
7. "Shaolin (Wudang Style)" – 3:06
8. "Behind the Mask (Qigong Mix)" – 3:37
9. "King of Everything (Kalari Mix)" – 4:57
10. "Enemy Ace (Anarkey Lime Pie Mix)" – 5:00
11. "Behind the Mask (Dopplo Machiatto Mix)" – 2:50
12. "Shadow of a Ghost (Guilty Remix)" – 5:07

== Personnel ==
- Keith Smith – lead vocals, guitar
- Adam von Buhler – bass, guitar, drums, synthesizer, keyboards
