= Days Creek, Oregon =

Unincorporated community in the state of Oregon, United States

- Census-designated place
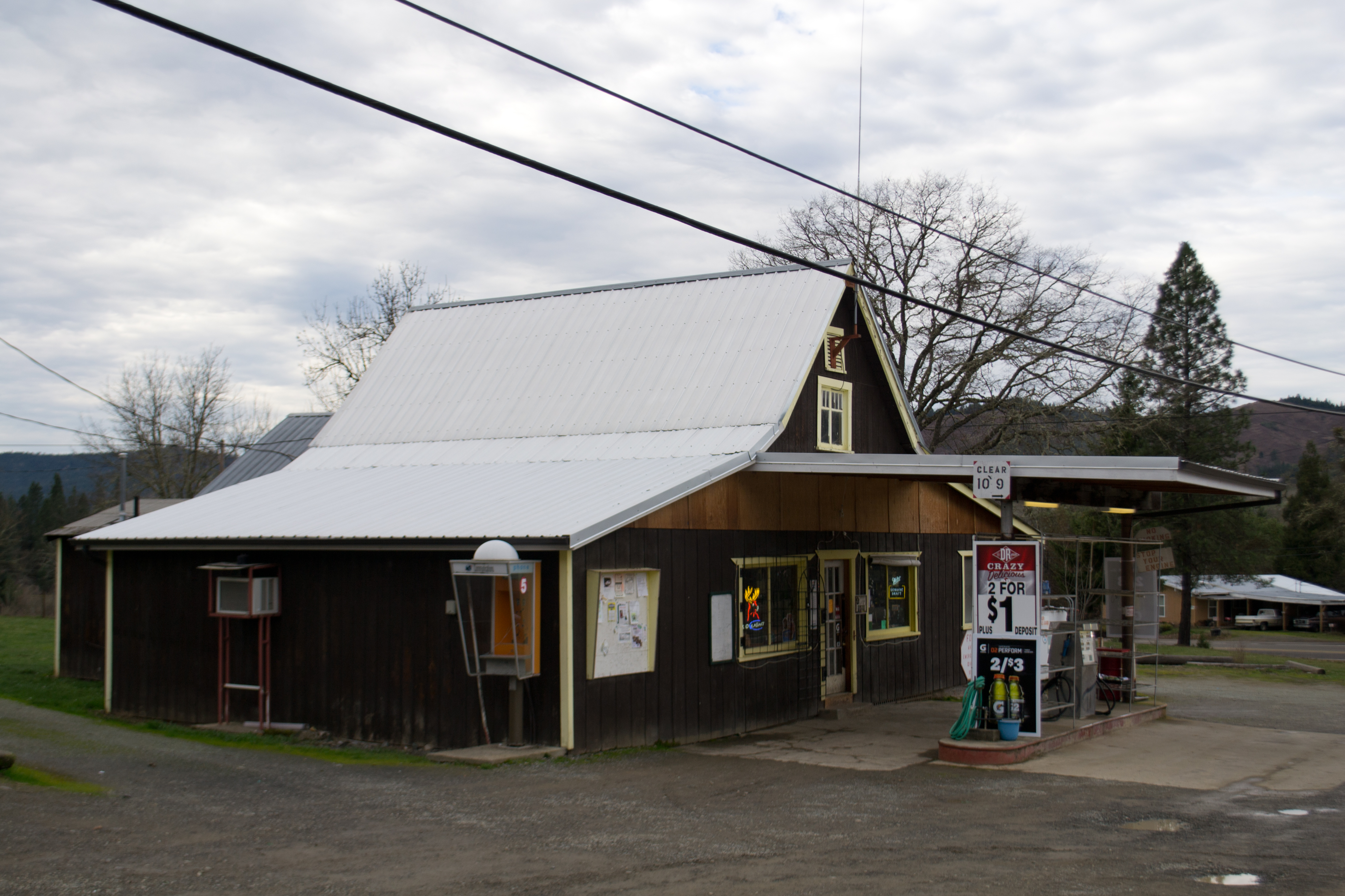
- General store in Days Creek, now closed

- Location within Oregon Location within the United States
- Coordinates: 42°58′14″N 123°09′57″W
- Country: United States
- State: Oregon
- County: Douglas

Area
  - Total: 2.36 sq mi (6.10 km^{2})
  - Land: 2.36 sq mi (6.10 km^{2})
  - Water: 0 sq mi (0.00 km^{2})
- Elevation: 810 ft (250 m)

Population (2020)
  - Total: 271
  - Density: 115.0/sq mi (44.41/km^{2})
- Time zone: UTC-8 (Pacific (PST))
  - Summer (DST): UTC-7 (PDT)
- ZIP code: 97429
- Area code: 541
- GNIS feature ID: 2611726
- FIPS code: 41-18150

Days Creek is an unincorporated community and census-designated place in Douglas County, Oregon, United States. As of the 2020 census, Days Creek had a population of 271.

The community was named after the local creek, which in turn was named for Patrick and George Day, who settled near its mouth in 1851. The post office was established in 1878 as "Day's Creek", but the name was changed to "Days Creek" c. 1890.

The Days Creek Charter School holds classes for K-12.

== Geography ==
The community of Days Creek is located on Oregon Route 227, at the confluence of Days Creek and the South Umpqua River. It is in southern Douglas County, 7 miles (11 km) east (upriver) of Canyonville.

According to the U.S. Census Bureau, the Days Creek CDP has an area of 2.4 square miles (6.1 km^{2}), all of it land.

=== Climate ===
This region experiences warm (but not hot) and dry summers, with no average monthly temperatures above 71.6 °F (22.0 °C). According to the Köppen Climate Classification system, Days Creek has a warm-summer Mediterranean climate, abbreviated "Csb" on climate maps.

== Demographics ==
Historical population
| Census | Pop. | Note | %± |
|---|---|---|---|
| 2020 | 271 | | — |
U.S. Decennial Census

== Notable Person ==
- Rick Foster, classical guitarist
