= Warren Barfield =

- Born: Warren Harding Barfield, Jr. May 4, 1979 (age 46)
- Genres: Christian
- Labels: Creative Trust Workshop, Essential
- Website: warrenbarfield.com

Warren Harding Barfield Jr. (born May 4, 1979) is a Christian musician.

== Musical career ==
Barfield's first two albums (Beyond Me and My Heart Is Quiet) were independently produced. In 2003, he was signed to CCM label Creative Trust Workshop (CTW), which gave him more exposure. 'My Heart Goes Out' and 'Mistaken', songs from his third album 'Warren Barfield' project became Top 10 Christian radio hits. CTW folded soon thereafter, and Barfield's second studio album, "Reach", was released by Reunion Records in 2006.

His third studio album, Worth Fighting For, was released on Essential Records in 2008, produced by Charlie Peacock. The song, "Love Is Not a Fight", from this album was included in the 2008 film, Fireproof.

The film inspired a tour, "Love Worth Fighting For", that was dedicated to the theme of preserving marriage and ran from 2009 till 2018. Barfield created and produced the tour partnering with promoter Mike Williams. Over 200,000 people have attended the event. The tour featured speaking by actor Kirk Cameron, who had played the lead role in Fireproof, and speaking, comedy and music by Barfield, whose aforementioned song had been inspired by realizations about his own marriage.

Barfield's 2012 album, Redbird, was independently produced (with members of the production team including Wayne Kirkpatrick, Bryan White, and members of Needtobreathe) and featured a more acoustic sound compared to his earlier albums. Mark Rice of JesusFreakHideout has called the album less accessible than Barfield's previous work, likely to turn off the fans of his early overproduced pop-style music, but "a very rewarding listen" that showed that Barfield was "still a force to be reckoned with in Christian music."

In 2009, Barfield became a speaker and child sponsorship advocate.

In 2017, Barfield officially retired from his work in the Christian music industry.

== Personal life ==
Warren has been married since September 1, 2001 and has two children.

== Discography ==
- Beyond Me (2000)
- My Heart Is Quiet (2001)
- Warren Barfield (2003)
- Reach (2006)
- Worth Fighting For (2008)
- Redbird (2012)

== Other songs ==
Warren Barfield has written several other songs available on other albums. "Next Door Savior" was recorded for an accompaniment to Max Lucado's book by the same title, along with "Live With Us". He also recorded a version of Keith Green's "Oh Lord, You're Beautiful" for CCM's Top 100 and "Alive, Forever Amen" for WOW Worship.

== See also ==
- List of guitarists
