= Melvin Taylor =

American electric blues guitarist

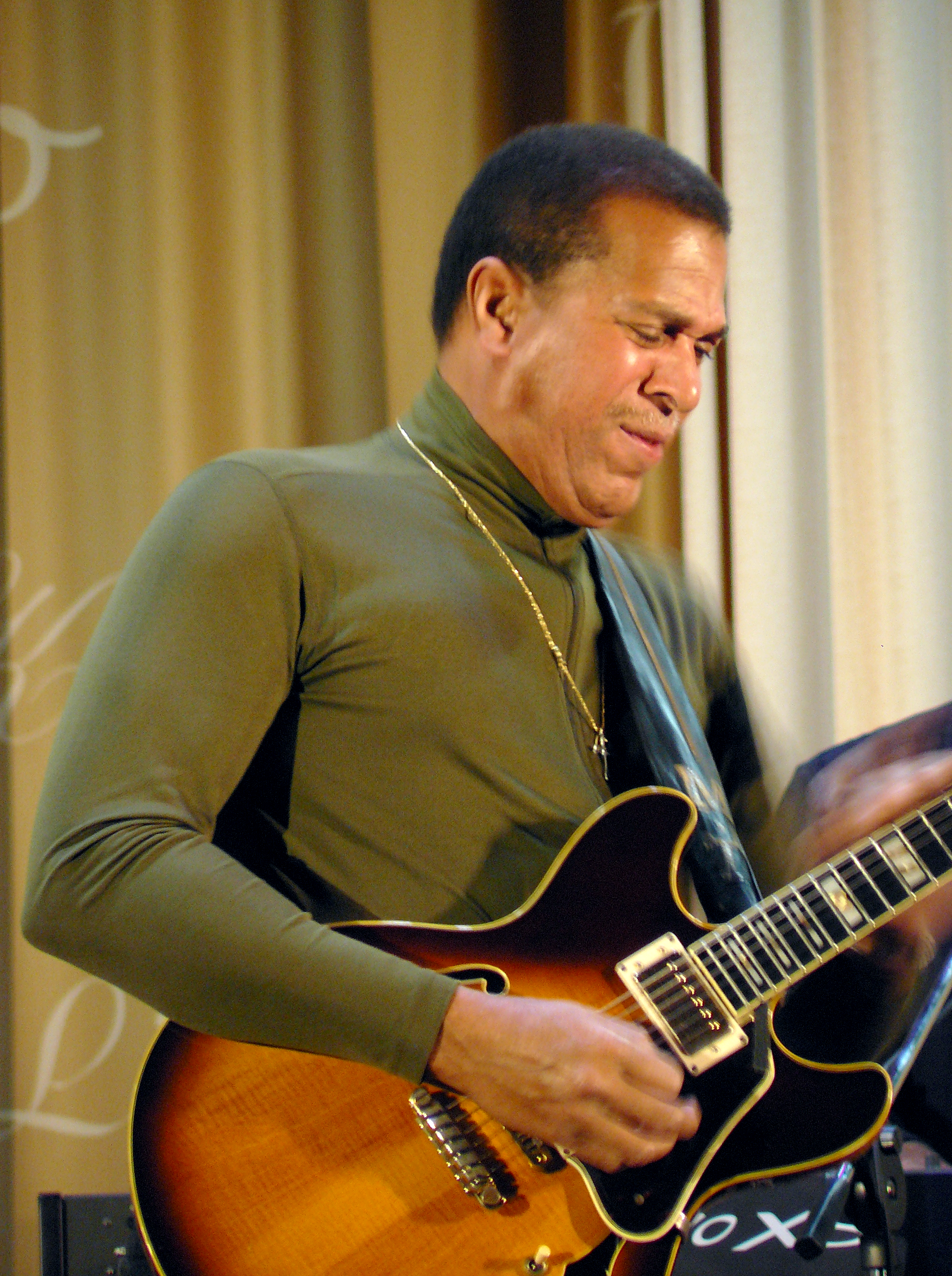
- Taylor performing in Kyiv, Ukraine, 2010

Background information
- Born: March 13, 1959 (age 67); Jackson, Mississippi, United States
- Origin: Chicago, Illinois, United States
- Genre: Electric blues
- Occupation: Guitarist
- Instrument: Guitar
- Website: melvintaylor.com

Melvin Taylor (born March 13, 1959) is an American electric blues guitarist, based in Chicago.

== Career ==
Taylor was born in Jackson, Mississippi, United States. He moved to Chicago with his parents in 1962.

He joined the Transistors, a popular music group. He switched his focus to blues music when the group disbanded in the early 1980s. He found work playing in clubs on the West Side of Chicago, often at Rosa's Lounge.

During the 1980s he joined Pinetop Perkins and the Legendary Blues Band in a year-long European tour. He has returned to Europe several times with his own group, which has opened for B.B. King, Buddy Guy, and Santana.

Taylor's recordings include two albums for Isabel Records, a French record label, Blues on the Run (1982) and Plays the Blues for You (1984). Recordings in the United States include Melvin Taylor and the Slack Band (1995), with John Snyder, released by Evidence Music, and Dirty Pool (1997). Taylor's Beyond the Burning Guitar was recorded in Misty Creek Studios, in Fairfax, Virginia. He also recorded a cover of the Skylar Grey–Eminem song "Love the Way You Lie", with the rapper, Matt Christian, at Misty Creek Studios.

== Discography ==
- Blues on the Run (Isabel [Fr], 1982; Evidence, 1994)
- Plays the Blues for You (Isabel [Fr], 1984; Evidence, 1993)
- Melvin Taylor and the Slack Band (Evidence, 1995)
- Dirty Pool (Evidence, 1997)
- Bang That Bell (Evidence, 2000)
- Rendezvous with the Blues (Evidence, 2002)
- My Heart Belongs to Jesus (Melvin Taylor Productions, 2007)
- Beyond the Burning Guitar (Melvin Taylor Productions, 2010) 2-CD
- Sweet Taste of Guitar (Melvin Taylor Productions, 2012)
- Taylor Made [6-song EP] (Melvin Taylor Productions, 2013)

== See also ==
- List of contemporary blues musicians
- List of guitarists
