= Dirty Pool =

Studio album by Melvin Taylor & the Slack Band
- Released: 1997
- Studio: Dockside
- Genre: Blues, Chicago blues
- Label: Evidence
- Producer: John Snyder

Melvin Taylor & the Slack Band chronology
Melvin Taylor and the Slack Band (1995)	Dirty Pool (1997)	Bang That Bell (2000)

Dirty Pool is an album by the American musician Melvin Taylor, released in 1997. He is credited with his Slack Band. Dirty Pool was Taylor's second album for Evidence Music.

== Production ==
The album was produced by John Snyder. James Knowles played drums on the album; Ethan Farmer played bass. The title track, "Too Sorry", and "Telephone Song" were written by Stevie Ray Vaughan. "Right Place, Wrong Time" is a cover of the Otis Rush song.

== Critical reception ==
Professional ratings
Review scores
Source	Rating
AllMusic	4.5/5 stars
The Penguin Guide to Blues Recordings	2.5/4 stars
Pittsburgh Post-Gazette	3/4 stars

The Pittsburgh Post-Gazette wrote that Taylor "incorporates slash-and-burn guitar work into his blues, soaring out of traditional choruses with scorching solos." The Toronto Star noted that "burners like 'Too Sorry' and 'I Ain't Superstitious' work particularly well in the great thrashing Chicago electric blues tradition, while Taylor's chatty voice works to contrast with all slurring, high- speed runs and pyrotechnic proficiency." The Detroit Free Press determined that "it's almost too easy to describe Chicago sensation Melvin Taylor as what Jimi Hendrix might have been had Hendrix never ventured outside R&B and roadhouse blues."

The Houston Chronicle stated: "Like Hendrix, Taylor is a master of the wah-wah pedal, a device that has been largely abandoned by younger guitarists... This daredevil technique recalls psychedelic rock or avant-garde jazz, except that Taylor never strays far from the basic blues groove." The Dallas Observer listed Dirty Pool among the best blues albums of 1997, concluding that "the music is scathing, three-piece power blues, roiling with wah and Echoplex." The Encyclopedia of the Blues considered Dirty Pool to be Taylor's best album.

== Track listing ==
No.	Title	Length
1.	"Too Sorry"
2.	"Dirty Pool"
3.	"I Ain't Superstitious"
4.	"Kansas City"
5.	"Floodin' in California"
6.	"Born Under a Bad Sign"
7.	"Right Place, Wrong Time"
8.	"Telephone Song"
9.	"Merry Christmas Baby"
