= Rick Foster =

Rick Foster is a guitarist and arranger who lives in the Days Creek, Oregon area, who plays classical and popular music, but who is most closely associated with Christian music.

== Biography ==
Foster began playing Hawaiian guitar when he was 10 years old. By age 12, he was playing electric guitar in a surf-rock band. At eighteen years of age, he was teaching guitar. When he was unable to find arrangements for guitar of his favorite hymns, he decided to create a repertoire.

Playing in classical style, but with country flavoring, he has recorded several albums, appearing on Bread & Honey Records, Chapel Records and Edensong Records. He has been nominated for a Dove Award by the Gospel Music Association.,

His arrangements have been featured by Chet Atkins and Christopher Parkening.

His guitar arrangements of hymns are published by Rick Foster Edensong, Fingerstyle Guitar Magazine and Mel Bay Publications.

== Discography ==
- Favorite Hymns for Classic Guitar (Bread & Honey 102)(Also "Hymns for Classic Guitar")(Edensong 602)
- More Hymns for Classic Guitar (Bread & Honey 118)(Edensong 618)
- Inspirational Guitar at Its Best (Chapel/Bridge 2327)(Bread & Honey 325)(Also 2 in 1 "Inspirational Guitar at Its Best" and "Sacred Classic Guitar")(Edensong 616)
- Sacred Classic Guitar (Edensong 609)(Also 2 in 1 "Inspirational Guitar at Its Best" and "Sacred Classic Guitar")(Edensong 616)
- Season of Joy (Edensong 600) (Moody Monthly Instrumental Album of the Year)
- Sacred Duos for Guitar and Violin (Edensong ESCD 605)
- "Eternal Guitar" (Edensong ESCD 612)
- "Best of Rick Foster—Close to Heaven" (Edensong ESCD 614)
- "Rick Foster's Remembrance of Chet Atkins and his guitars" (Edensong ESCD 624)
- "Faith is the Reason" (Edensong ESCD 620)
