= Elyasaf Kowner =

Israeli interdisciplinary artist (born 1970)

Elyasaf Kowner אליסף קובנר
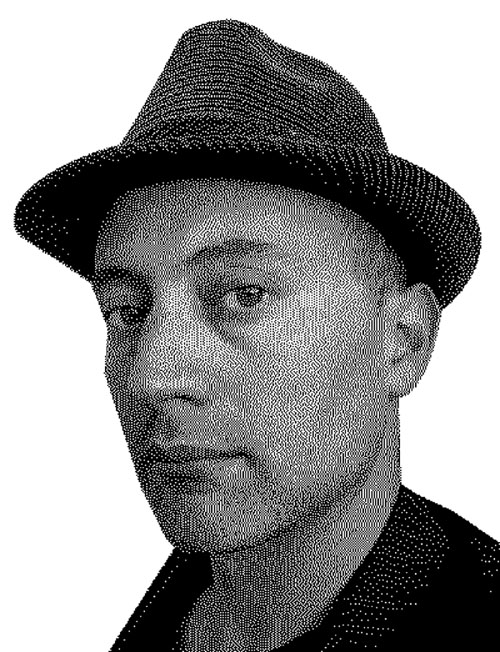
- Elyasaf Kowner in 2008
- Born: July 13, 1970; Haifa, Israel
- Known for: Film, Video art, photography

Elyasaf Kowner (Hebrew: אליסף קובנר; born 1970) is an Israeli interdisciplinary artist who explores issues of abuse, loss, control and love for people. He has made over 30 poetic short films that were screened in festivals and museums internationally. Kowner was described as a "multidisciplinary who can convert anything to art, design, documentary or other creative gold."

== Biography ==
Elyasaf Kowner was born in Haifa, Israel. He is the third child of Carmela and Leon Kowner, a Holocaust survivor who survived the Auschwitz concentration camp. He attended the Maale Hacarmel primary school, and spent 3rd grade in Oxford, England.

Kowner first received media attention while spending two years in New York (1993–1995), where he sprayed a series of graffiti works. Among them were the acclaimed graffiti ads of sprayed high heel shoes, to which he added sentences such as 'Desire Has No Limits' and 'Pure Timeless Seduction', pretending he was a fashion designer who came from Paris by signing his graffiti works 'Elyasaf Kowner, Paris'.

In the end of 1995 he spent a few months in Japan interacting with street passers using pantomime, and later continued to study in Bezalel Academy of Art and Design in Jerusalem. During a photography course in 1997, while in a student exchange program at the Dutch Royal Academy of Art, he made the book Moments in Growth. The book contains one hundred double spreads that juxtapose black-and-white photos with text. Kowner later claimed "it has been a result of a mystical connection" and described a journey that lasted one day. In 1999, his installation titled After my Death (1999) explored an imaginary death and contained video monologues of friends exploring memories related to life loving situations. The project won the Sandberg award.

From the year 2000 to 2003 Kowner wandered around the streets of Tel Aviv, talking to strangers and shooting videos. In 2002 he published Car Portraits, a book that followed a video documenting strangers in their passing cars. Despite the fact that inevitably, the camera creates a barrier, what happened there was a mystical, energetic connection between Kowner and the people he met as they are hidden behind the crossbars of their cars.

Kowner’s camera documents segments of daily events, which undergo minimal editing, and some of these segments are presented almost as stills. Most scenes are based on interaction between individuals, which the camera singles out from the movement of the crowd and from tumultuous urban life. The filming, which tends to focus on various physical gestures, charges the human action with strains of despair and hope destined to be endlessly repeated. The segments are taken out of coherent context and the viewer is invited to infuse them with subjective meaning. These moments – blending softness with violence, daily routine with elements of surprise and even ecstasy – are captured by a curious and sometimes empathetic eye that yields to random phenomena and events, not from a critical standpoint but from attentiveness to the contemporary rhythm of life that pulses in the city and on its fringes.

— Ilana Tenenbaum, "Trapped in the Gestures of the Day-To-Day', '15', Haifa Museum, 2005

In 2003 after winning the ‘First Portrait’ prize Kowner received a grant from the Israel National Lottery, which was followed by an exhibition in the Tel Aviv museum. There he constructed an installation containing a living room like space with a TV screening Violent Emotion. In Violent Emotion, one shot we witness a mixture of passion and violence between two people, one strong and one weak in a romantic relationship. The Macho male is revealed quite gruesomely in this work. Violent Emotion was later screened during Michal Heiman's installation What are You Thinking? (2004) and deceived viewers who while being tested were sure the scene is fiction. None of the documented reactions were ever passed on to the artist as promised.

In 2004 Kowner participated in the World Wide Video Festival, Amsterdam, releasing Aftershock, a short film documenting a scene right after a suicide bomb attack in Tel Aviv that occurred in Mike's Place in April 2003. They were three men who came out without a scratch. They were still in shock during those hours while the memories keep flashing back.

In the subsequent years his films and videos appeared in numerous festivals such as Video Zone festival, Israel, Wro Festival, Poland, New Media Art Festival, Korea, and in art publications such as Bizz Circuits play Intifada Offspring and the Italian ffwd mag

== Works ==
=== Books ===
- Moments in Growth (1997, published in a limited edition) is a photographic book bringing the experience of a journey that lasted one day. Kowner made the book during 1997, while in a student exchange program at the Royal Academy of Art, The Hague, Netherlands.
- Car Portraits (2002, published by Janco Dada Museum) is an exploration of the gaze documenting strangers passing in their passing cars. The images are from the video Car portraits, and were all taken from the same location on the promenade in Tel Aviv, portraying the variety of those passing there.
- 15 (2005, ISBN 965-7067-60-X) is a CD catalog which followed the exhibition 15. It contains an essay by Ilana Tenenbaum and samples of the videos and still photographs that appeared in the show. The CD was released in a limited edition by Haifa museum of contemporary art.
- Facing the wishes (2007, ISBN 978-965-7171-42-4) is a book containing the portraits and wishes of the children of Brenner primary school, Tel Aviv. Elyasaf Kowner met each of the children in person, talked to them and took their photographs. A portrait of each child appears in the book in an attempt to transcend the magical moment of making a wish.

=== Videography ===
- Murder Here by Artist, 6:30 min (2008)
- 6:40 (Pecha Kucha), 6:40 min (2008)
- Ya Syndrome, 5:10 min (2008)
- Jodey, 1:00 min (2007)
- The Laundromat, 1:40 min (2006)
- Polania, 2:10 min (2006)
- Red Light/Red Heat, 5:30 min (2006)
- Learning Pain from Trees, 3:00 min (2005)
- I will yet come to your threshold, 2:50 min (2005)
- In my Home, 11:30 min (2005)
- The Handed Thread, 5:00 min (2005)
- Making Poems in Writing, 4:00 min (2005)
- Houdini Triptych, 0:18 sec (loop) (2005)
- Green Grass, 3:30 min (2004)
- Dynamism of a Phone Booth, 0:40 sec (loop) (2004)
- Le Rendez-vous, 7:00 min (2004)
- Snow Way, 4:00 min (2004)
- Violent Emotion, 2:30 min (2003)
- Around the Fire, 11:00 min (2003)
- Fufyk, 4:00 min (2003)
- Triumvirate, 2:00 min (2003)
- Aftershock, 13:00 min (2003)
- The Road to Knowhere, 2:30 min (2003)
- Dual Movie (with Boaz Arad), 15:00 min (2002)
- Call Me, 03:00 min (2002)
- Sunset, 8:30 min (2002)
- Car Portraits, 05:00 min (2002)
- Perfect Form, 01:00 min (2002)
- Diamond on the Beach, 7:30 min (2001)
- Amne, 08:30 min (2001)
- Dad Explains about Weapons and Numbers, 5:00 min (2001)
- Every Time I am (reading) Somebody, 4:00 (2001)
- In the Center, 15:00 min (2001)
- The Painting, 7:00 min (2001)
- On the Shoulders, 4:00 min (2000)
- Up and Down, 4:00 min (2000)
- Sea Baby, 03:40 (2000)
- After My Death, 12:00 min (1999)
- Measuring the Distance on a First Winter's Day, 46:00 min (1997)

=== Discography ===
- Ressek Zar (2010, released by Hi Fidelity) The collaboration between Elyasaf Kowner and Uri Frost yielded the music project Ressek Zar (from Hebrew lit. Foreign Purée). It is a journey into an ever-changing identity exploration made up of nine songs that range from folk to rock, expanding into psychedelic and country combined with multiple classical motifs. The album was hailed as "the embodiement of pure art. Kowner and Frost are in constant search and they give the listener that feeling of going into a museum of modern art".
