= Uri Frost =

Israeli musical artist

Uri Frost אורי פרוסט
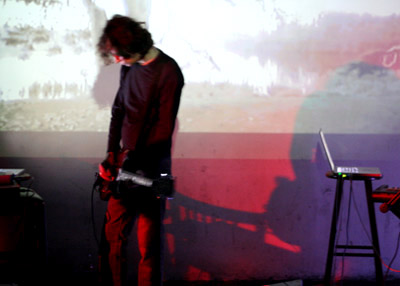
- Uri Frost in concert, 2009

Background information
- Born: Uri Frost Kostman; December 22, 1962; Düsseldorf, Germany
- Genres: Indie rock, folk rock, experimental, lo-fi
- Occupations: Music, film, composer
- Instruments: Guitar, Bass, Synthesizer
- Years active: 1984–present
- Labels: Hed Arzi; Nana Disc; No Distribution; Earsay
- Member of: Kazbah, Hapliz, Carmela Gross Wagner, Rir, Rare, Katamine, Mambas

Uri Frost (Hebrew: אורי פרוסט; born December 22, 1962), is a musician, composer, producer and director.

Frost grew up in Europe and Brazil before moving to Israel in 1973. He formed the bands Kazbah (in Rio de Janeiro), Hapliz, Carmela Gross Wagner, Rir, and Mambas. He has written music for film, dance, theater and video installations which have been presented worldwide and works as musical producer with other bands and songwriters. After spending some time in film school he directed shorts, multi disciplinary projects for stage and music videos. His short Sci-fi film 22/D was awarded the 1995 prize for Best Experimental Short by the Israeli Film Institute.

His original music for the Netflix series Lenox Hill (2020) has been nominated for the Hollywood Music in Media Awards in the category of original score for documentary series.a musician, composer, producer and director.

== Career ==
=== Early years ===
Uri Frost was born in Düsseldorf, Germany. He spent his early childhood living in Brussels, Rio de Janeiro and Vienna before moving to Israel in 1973. He is self taught, his first guitar being a $150 Gibson SG,(he was told about by future bandmate Yoav Shaaya) which is still his main guitar.

=== 1980s ===
==== Kazbah ====
In 1984 Frost went back to Rio de Janeiro and by chance began playing again, now with Philippe Hemadou who played the Moog synthesizer, and then with Adriana Dolabella whom Frost taught to play the Bass. Together they formed the band Kazbah which was part of the underground scene that started taking off in Rio de Janeiro in the mid-1980s. The band recorded in a secluded farm on the outskirts of the jungle, using a 4 channel tape with Frost also programming a Dr. Rhythm drum machine. They produced several instrumental tracks several and songs, one of which became a hit and was often played on the mythic Radio Fluminense.

==== HaPliz ====
In 1988 Frost returned to Israel and together with "Shosho" Yoav Shaaya, formed the band HaPliz. Later Shahar Levi joined on the Bass and Niss (who never disclosed his full name) on the drums. The band mixed rock and roll with a scent of middle eastern music. HaPliz is considered to "have been there ahead of their time and prepared the ground for what was to follow later, through the generation of the Roxanne bands". Their single album Under the Spell (בהשפעת הכישוף) is a "well constructed, brilliant array of songs that shows HaPliz in it's [sic] best moments," concluded the music critique Yoram Bar after returning from their show which he wrote, "had been the best rock show I have experienced in my entire life."

=== 1990s ===
==== Carmela Gross Wagner ====
Frost had also begun working at the time with Eran Zur on a project that became the band Carmela Gross Wagner. They were joined by Ori Ballak (percussion) and Avshalom Kaspi (keyboards). In 1991 they recorded their debut album, Black Flower (Hebrew: פרח שחור), which was a massive success and hugely influential. Later on, Frost left the band but continued working as guest musician and producer.

==== Film school ====
In 1992 Frost started at the Sam Spiegel Film School, Jerusalem. His 2nd year project was the film 22/D, a Sci fi political tale that shows a few episodes in the life of a man who immigrated to Israel and is faced with a Zionist conspiracy. The film was awarded the 1995 prize for Best Experimental Short by the Israeli Film Institute. In 1995, he left Sam Spiegel without completing the program.

==== Paluma Twist ====
Together with an old friend, percussionist Arik Hayut, collaborated on the project titled Paluma Twist in 1994. They worked on different songs and released only one of them. It was a cover of The Soldier Song (שיר החייל) by Shlomo Artzi.

==== Reer ====
Between 1992 and 1995 Frost was a member of the band Reer. Together with Arik Hayut, Ran Slavin (Shalosh Het) and Adam Horovitz of Nosei Hamigbaat (נושאי המגבעת). They released two albums with the Israeli major label Hed Artzi - Reer in 1993 and Private Pleasures (as Rare), in 1996.

==== The London years ====
Between 1996 and 2000 Frost lived in London and wrote music for Theater. He has written music for seven different plays among them 3 Short Breaths at Croydon Warehouse, Fever at Riverside Studios, People Show 105 at Young Vic studio. In 1999 he directed the theater performance Miss, Did it Hurt When You Fell Down from Heaven, as part of the London festival for visual theater.

=== 2000s ===
In 2000 Frost returned to Israel and from 2001 started to write music for dance. He directed and wrote music for Iteret and "Gaza" by Tamar Borer, Black Country, Tetris, Arnika for Noa Dar, Between 2002 and 2004 he collaborated with Ran Slavin on SuBo, an improvisational duo which used live electronic instruments and video. They performed in Austria, Slovenia and Israel. In 2002 he composed the soundtrack for the Israeli documentary Garden (directed by Adi Barash and Ruthie Shatz). In 2005 Assaf Tager invited Frost to produce Katamine's first album (Lag) and Frost also directed two video clips. Lag included nine original songs and a cover of the Butthole Surfers. The album was voted Album of the Year by the weekly Haiir.

==== Ressek Zar ====
In 2010 Frost collaborated on an album with artist Elyasaf Kowner Ressek Zar (from Hebrew lit. Foreign Purée), released and distributed by Hi Fidelity. The album was described as "the embodiment of pure art. Kowner and Frost are in constant search and they give the listener that feeling of going into a museum of modern art".

==== Mambas ====
Also in 2010 Frost co-founded Tel Aviv-based alternative electronic band Mambas with Jeki Ameamemet (vocals) and Gil Luz (keyboards). The trio's music incorporates elements of dance, noise and pop. The band's music, though based on electronic sounds, is played live, creating a combination of loop-based dance music and a live rock performance. In 2013 Frost produced the debut album of the Amsterdam and Tel Aviv-based band Hexenschuss by Mambas keyboarder Gil Luz and the drummer Assi Weitz (JAP, ex-Gone Bald).

== Selected discography ==
- 1988 – HaPliz, Behashpaat Hakishouf (Under the Spell), (Hebrew: בהשפעת הכישוף), The Third Ear
- 1991 - Carmela Gross Wagner, Black Flower (Hebrew: פרח שחור), Hed Arzi
- 1993 - Reer, Hed Arzi
- 1996 - Rare, Hed Arzi
- 2010 - Resek Zar, Hi Fidelity
- 2013 - Mambas, Wasabi Baby, Self Released

== Work as Producer ==
- 2004 - Katamine, Lag, No Distribution
- 2012 - Opioids, Temporary Phase
- 2013 - Hexenschuss, Self-Titled
- 2016 - Shirly Kones, Self-Titled

== Work as director ==
- 1995 - Short film 22/D
- 1999 - Theater performance Miss, Did it Hurt When You Fell Down from Heaven
- 2001 - Dance performance Iteret
- 2003 - Dance performance "Gaza"
- 2005 - Short film The Escaped
- 2008 - Short film Pussy Men
- 2014 - Music video Lambshake for the band Hexenschuss
