= Keith Smith (guitarist) =

- Born: Keith David Smith
- Origin: Boston, Massachusetts, United States
- Genres: Rock

Keith Smith is the vocalist and rhythm guitarist for the band Anarchy Club.

Before creating Anarchy Club, Smith was in several bands, including Cobalt 60, known as C60. Smith was also an employee of Harmonix, the company that developed Guitar Hero. According to Rock Band, Smith got a guitar lesson from Kurt Cobain in the hallway of a motel in Rhode Island, and was reputed to have punched Billy Idol in the face after he insulted American punk rock. In 2005, Anarchy Club's hit "Behind the Mask" appeared in Guitar Hero. They have since appeared in Guitar Hero II with their song "Collide", Rock Band with their song "Blood Doll" and Rock Band 2 with their song "Get Clean". Both "Collide" and "Blood Doll" are from their EP A Single Drop of Red released in 2007 while "Behind the Mask" is from their debut album The Way and Its Power and "Get Clean" is from their second full-length album The Art of War.
