= Katamine =

Israeli musical band of changing artists

Katamine קטאמין
- Origin: Israel
- Years active: 2004–present
- Members: Assaf Tager; Uri Frost; Haggai Fershtman; Zoe Polanski

Katamine (Hebrew: קטאמין) is a collaborative musical project that joins a changing cast of artists with the Israeli singer and songwriter Assaf Tager (אסף תג'ר). Today, Assaf Tager collaborate with Uri Frost (guitar), Haggai Fershtman (drums) and Zoe Polanski (Vocals, Bass and Casio synthesizer).

After graduating from the London Music Academy, Tager began to take on musical projects that challenged different aspects of his ability. During this time, among other projects, he played guitar for Elliott Smith and Beth Gibbons, and scored string arrangements for the pop group Moloko. Soon after, he decided to return to Israel to pursue his own goals. He became a member of the Israeli super-group "Family Butchers", which was soon asked to record by record producer Bob Weston, but was primarily focused on his solo work, which became the idea for Katamine.

The first recording released under the name Katamine was released in 2004. It was an eponymous EP consisting of 5 acoustic songs - four originals and a cover of Sonic Youth's Pacific Coast Highway. The record was positively reviewed by Yedioth Ahronoth.

The full-length album Lag followed in 2005. On it Tager collaborated with several musicians, among them the guitarist Uri Frost of Carmela Gross Wagner and Rir and Sharon Kantor of The Girls. The album included 9 original songs and a cover of Butthole Surfers' Creep in the Cellar. Israeli media has called it "a beautiful, cruel and gloomy CD; more painful than Elliott Smith, [and as] powerful as Kurt Cobain".

Katamine's next album, Forest of Bobo was produced by Wharton Tiers and released in 2006. This was a concept album, telling the life story of Bobo the bear. Each song was accompanied by a drawing in the CD booklet, painted by the radical comic artist Seth Tobocman. In 2006 Katamine were also the opening act on Devendra Banhart's concert in Israel.
