= Roberto Diana =

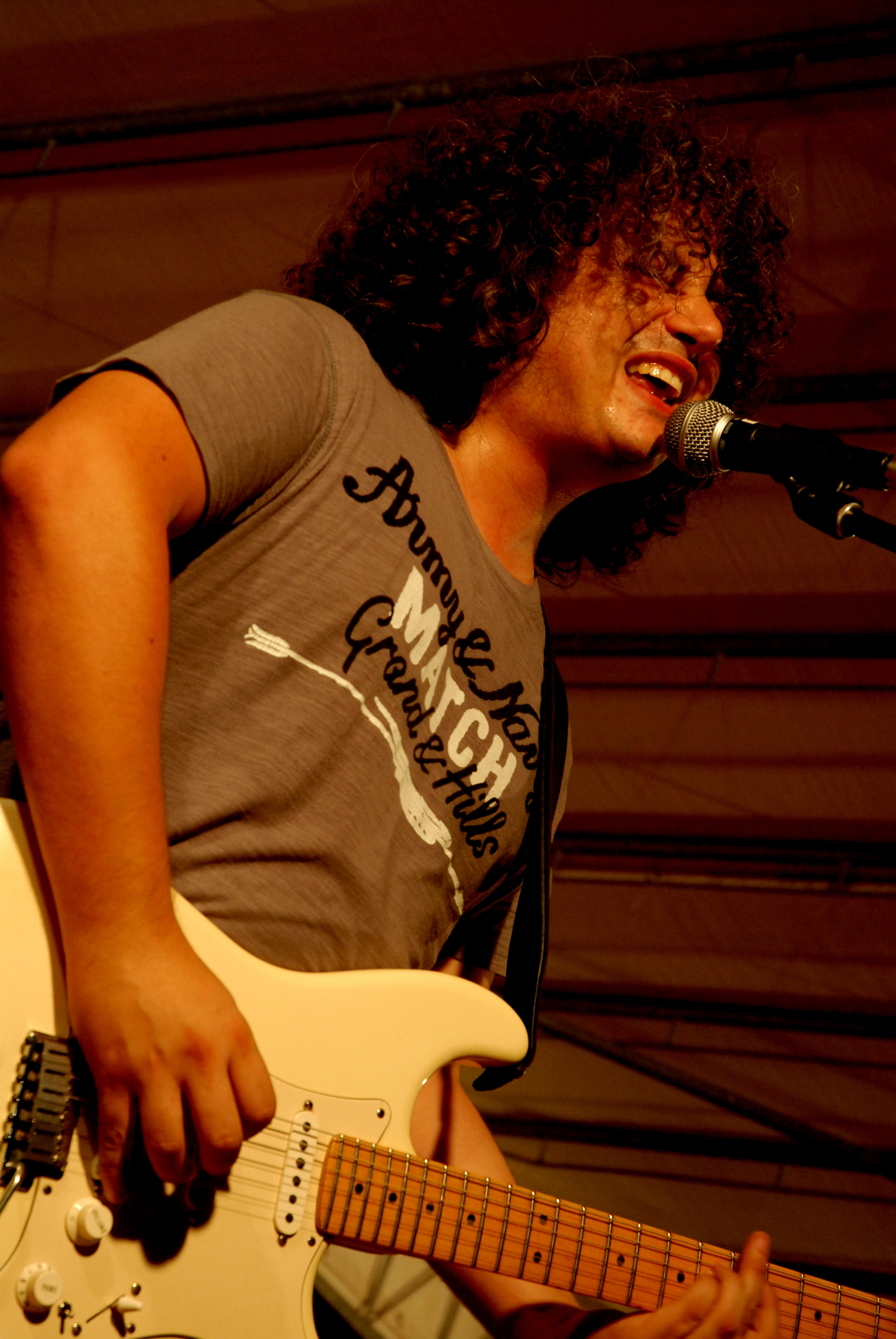
- Roberto Diana Live

Background information
- Born: 21 February 1983 (age 43); Luras, Sardinia, Italy
- Genres: Rock, Indie rock
- Occupations: Musician, multi-instrumentalist, guitarist
- Instruments: Electric guitar, slide guitar, acoustic guitar, resophonic guitar, bouzouki, mandolin, lap steel, cigar box guitar, Weissenborn guitar
- Years active: 1997–present
- Website: www.robertodiana.com

Roberto Diana (born 21 February 1983) is an Italian musician, guitarist, composer, producer and session man.

== Biography ==
He was born in Luras, Sardinia, Italy. He started to play guitar at the age of 14 and immediately began to go on tour with some local bands. He graduated at Conservatorio "Luigi Canepa" in Sassari, then he attended workshops of jazz guitar by Paolo Fresu at Nuoro Jazz. In 2003 he moved to Milan, where in 2007 he graduated in MCR (Master chitarra rock) with Donato Begotti at the "Accademia del Suono".

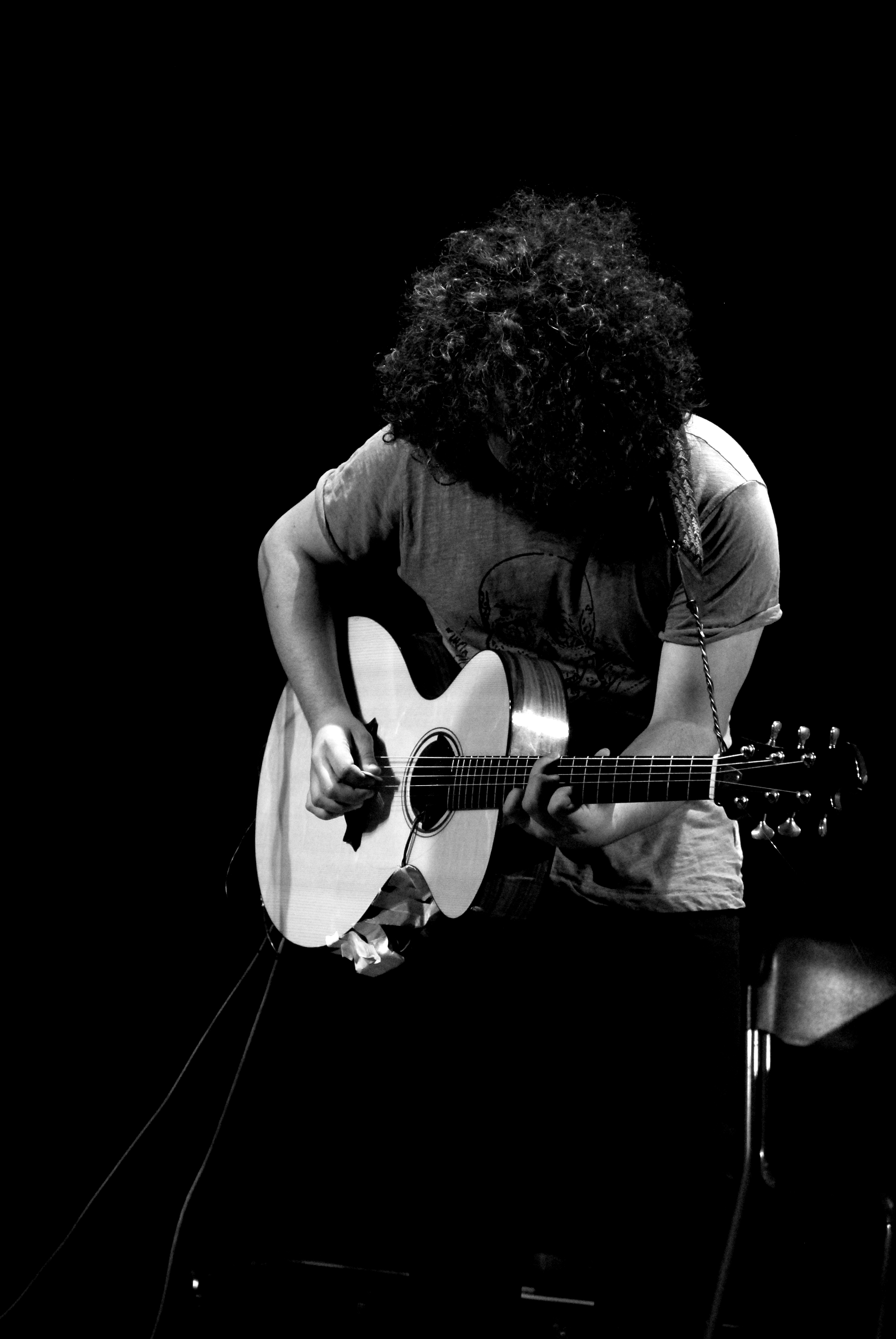

== Solo career ==
In 2010 he started to work to his first album "Raighes vol 1". In March 2013 the album was nominated at 12th Independent Music Awards category Instrumental. This is the first part of two albums. At the end of 2011, about this first album, was released a preview in smaller version, "Rough Tapes". This first production receives an immediate success from critics. In June 2012 comes out the final version of Vol 1 and Roberto Diana leaves for a European Tour. He plays in different country: Luxembourg, Scotland, Germany, UK and Italy. In 2015 he release a live music film DVD unique of his genre. Filmed under a 4000yrs old Oleaster tree in [Luras] In 2016 his instrumental EP Live at Whisky a Go Go was nominated at The 15th Independent Music Awards in the category Best Instrumental EP. March 2017 Release the awaited "Raighes Vol 2" rated with 5 stars from Rock & Reel UK and acclaimed by the critics. The album has been accepted at the first ballots at the 60th Grammy Awards.

== America ==
He began working with several American artists such as Hussain Jiffry, Will T. Massey, Steve Lukather, Tony Levin, Vinnie Colaiuta, Frank Gambale, Dean Parks, Brian Ray, JP Cervoni, Simon Phillips, James Raymond, Rachel Z, Richard Hunter, Mike Slo-Mo Brenner, Chris Cacavas, as a sound engineer, guitarist and producer for various albums. In 2009 he went to Los Angeles to play at NAMM Show, one of the most important music fair of the world. In that occasion he presented his signature guitar.

From January until March 2014 he toured his solo album "Raighes Vol 1" all over California closing the tour March 15 at the Whisky a Go Go where he record the Live album released in May 2015. Roberto often goes on tour in the United States.

== Awards and nominations ==
=== Independent Music Awards ===
Year	Nominee / work	Award	Result
2019	"The Forth Hour"	Best Instrumental Song	Nominated

Year	Nominee / work	Award	Result
2016	"Live at The Whisky a Go Go"	Best Instrumental EP	Nominated

Year	Nominee / work	Award	Result
2013	"Raighes Vol 1"	Best Instrumental Album	Nominated

=== Global Music Awards - Silver Medal ===
Year	Nominee / work	Award	Result
2018	"The Fourth Hour"	Instrumental	Won

== The signature guitar ==
In 2009 the lutherie MN Guitar made for him the acoustic guitar "Twilight 001/09" that accompanying him in his tour around the world.

== Lowlands ==
In 2008 he joined the roots rock band Lowlands and, to date, has recorded three albums with them and has toured with them. He co-produced all three albums with bandleader Edward Abbiati and played Weissenborn, lap steel, electric, acoustic and slide guitar. Gypsy Child (2010), which featured duets with Amanda Shires and Tim Rogers (You Am I) and was mixed by Chris Cacavas. Three EPs – EP Vol. 1 (2009) and two download only live recordings – Radio & Kitchen Sessions (2010) and Live in Newport(2011).

In 2011 he played on and co-produced with Edward Abbiati the album Fathers & Sons for Scottish folk duo Donald and Jen MacNeill and played on the tour.

Roberto co-produced with Abbiati the album (as Lowlands and Friends) a Woody Guthrie tribute album, Better World Coming.

With Lowlands have toured extensively, both in Italy and abroad, playing clubs, small theatres and festivals (as well as a few jails and one church). Highlights include various headline gigs at the Windmill in Brixton, London, Whelans, Dublin and The Roisin Dubh, Galway in Ireland and Spaziomusica in Pavia, Italy.

== Endorsements ==
He works with some important musical brands such as Seymour Duncan, Elixir strings, Reference Laboratory cables, Source audio and MN guitar. As demonstrator of this brands, he performs at all major music fairs: NAMM show Los Angeles, MusicMesse Frankfurt, SHG Milan, Acoustic Guitar International Meeting of Sarzana and ADGPA Convention.

== Other work ==
In 2007, he founded, with Marco Pinna, the acoustic duo Ses Cordas (which means six strings in the Sardinian language). This acoustic duo is focused on Mediterranean folk music. In 2008, he released, with the duo, the album Mediterranean Journey.

In 2008 he recorded, co-produced, and played on the album Online by Simone Borghi with the collaboration of Toto's members Steve Lukather and Simon Phillips, guitarists Frank Gambale, Dean Parks, and Brian Ray (from Paul McCartney’s band), and jazz pianist from New York City, Rachel Z. The single "Every Night Together" (2009), performed with Italian singer Linda Valori, received three nominations at the Grammy Awards in 2010. Borghi himself received a nominations as "best new artist" and "best male pop vocal" with the song "Endless Trip" from his new album.

In 2011, he took part in the realization and production of the album Fathers & Sons for the Scottish duo Donald and Jen MacNeil.

== Discography ==
=== Solo ===
- Raighes Vol 1 Rough Tapes – Roberto Diana (2011)
- Raighes Vol 1 – Roberto Diana (2012)
- Deus ti Salvet Maria – Roberto Diana (Raighes Factory) (2014)
- Live at The Whisky a Go Go – Roberto Diana (Raighes Factory) (2015)
- Timeline – Donald MacNeill & Roberto Diana (Standing Stone/Raighes Factory) (2016)
- Raighes Vol 2 – Roberto Diana (Raighes Factory/I.R.D.) (2017)
- The Fourth Hour – Roberto Diana & Tri Nguyen (Raighes Factory) (2018)
- Dust on The Road – Roberto Diana & bzur (Raighes Factory) (2019)
- Ispiriendi – Roberto Diana (Raighes Factory) (2019)
- Crossings – Roberto Diana & Elgafar (Raighes Factory) (2020)

=== Albums ===
- The last call : Lowlands (Gypsy Child/IRD) (2008)
- Mediterranean journey – Ses Cordas (Sound Mama/CDBaby) (2008)
- On line – Simone Borghi (2008)
- Ep vol 1 – Lowlands (Gypsy Child/IRD) (2009)
- Gypsy child – Lowlands (Gypsy Child/IRD) (2010)
- Fathers and Sons – Donald and Jen Macneil (Route 61) (2011)
- The Woody EP – Lowlands (Gypsy Child) (2012)
- Better world coming – Lowlands (Gypsy Child/IRD) (2012)
- Beyond – Lowlands (Stovepony Records/Cargo/IRD) (2012)
- London Town – Anna MacDonald (Stovepony) (2013)
- Love Etc – Lowlands (Harbour Song/Cargo/IRD) (2014)
- News from the Moon – Ivan Battistella (Resisto) (2016)
- Townes Van Zandt's Last Set – Lowlands and friends (Route 61 / Harbour Song) (2016)
- Fram – Tommy Berre & Roberto Diana (2AT/Raighes Factory) (2018)
- Home Away from Home – Denis Turbide & Roberto Diana (Raighes Factory) (2019)
- Cold Winter Night – The Field Tapes & Roberto Diana (The Sonder House / Raighes Factory) (2019)

=== Official bootleg ===
- A Quiet Night – Roberto Diana (2011)
- Lovers & Thieves – Lowlands (2011)
- Radio & Kitchen Sessions – Acoustic Tour 2010 – Lowlands (2010)

=== Singles ===
- Every Night Together – Simone Borghi (2009)
- It Makes No Sense – Simone Borghi (2010)
- Pay the Price – Ivan Battistella (2010)
- Walking Down The Street – Lowlands (2010)

=== Compilations ===
- For You 2 – Lowlands (Route 61) (2010)
- Traffic light project – Roberto Diana (2009)
