= Mircea Gogoncea =

Romanian classical guitarist

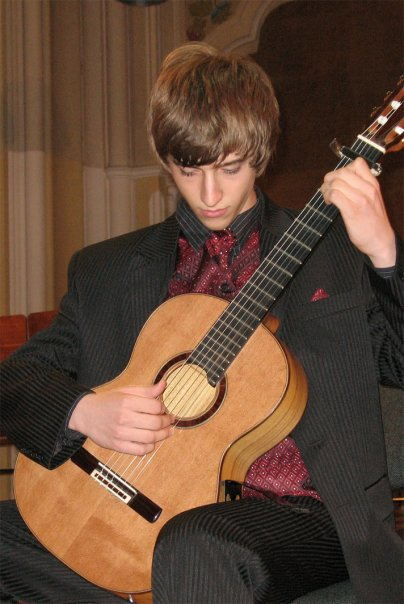
- Mircea Gogoncea, concert in Satu Mare, 2008

Background information
- Birth name: Mircea Ştefan Gogoncea
- Born: October 27, 1991 (age 33); Bucharest, Romania
- Genres: Classical
- Occupation: Guitarist
- Instrument: Classical guitar

Mircea Ștefan Gogoncea (born October 27, 1991, in Bucharest, Romania) is a Romanian classical guitarist.

== Biography ==
Mircea Gogoncea started studying classical guitar at the age of four with Eugen Mang, having his first stage and competition performances at the age of five. He graduated from the Pro College in 2003, with the Diploma of Excellence in the field of classical music - classical guitar.

He is currently a student of Joaquin Clerch at the Robert Schumann Music College in Düsseldorf, Germany, after having graduated from the George Enescu Music High School in Bucharest. He was the second Romanian student ever to complete two school years in the time of one, by skipping directly from the 7th to the 9th school grade.

== Career and evaluation ==
At the age of eight he participated in the Klassik im Sommer Tour (6-18 of July, 2000, Hamburg).

He also performed at the opening of the Golden Lion Film Festival (Venice on 7 September 2003) and the Grand Gala UNESCO.

He was invited to play concerts and take part in TV and radio shows in 11 countries in Europe, Asia, Africa and North-America.

His general record includes 140 prizes in 8 different fields of activity: classical guitar, mathematics, informatics, literary creation, theater, painting, photography and various school subjects.

Mircea Gogoncea's classical guitar record includes 87 awards in national and international guitar competitions in locations like Benicàssim, Almería, Cáceres (Spain), Los Angeles, Dallas, (United States of America), Düsseldorf, Velbert, Weimar (Germany), Belgrade (Yugoslavia), Alessandria (Italy), Sinaia, Tulcea, Ploieşti, Târgovişte, Bucharest, Alba-Iulia, Cluj-Napoca, Bacău (Romania). Out of those, 48 are first prizes (among the total of 59 first prizes obtained in the 8 above-mentioned fields), and 3 are "great prizes".

Mircea Gogoncea is the winner of the Youth Competition Division I of the GFA Convention 2007 (Los Angeles, California).

He is also the audience prize winner of the Francisco Tárrega guitar competition in Benicàssim, Spain, 2010, and has been awarded, among other distinctions, the second prize at the Julián Arcas guitar competition in Almería, Spain, in November 2011.

He was also one of the few guitarists to have ever earned recognition at various music contests open to all instruments and voice, for example by being awarded the first prize at the Schmolz und Bickenbach competition in Düsseldorf, Germany, 2011, and the "great prize" at the "George Georgescu" music competition in Tulcea, Romania, 2003.

In 2012 he was awarded the first prize in the competition of the Jan-Wellem-Loge of Düsseldorf.

He attended the master classes of Leo Brouwer, Nikita Koshkin, Sergio Assad, Carlo Marchione, Pavel Steidl, John Dearman, Marcin Dylla, Hubert Käppel, among others.

== Recitals ==
Not including his competition performances, he has taken part in more than 200 public concerts, television and radio shows in and outside of his native Romania.

Concerts in which Gogoncea has taken part include, but are not limited to, the following:

- Mauro Giuliani Concert for Guitar and Orchestra, No. 1, Op. 30 - Director Ilarion Ionescu-Galaţi, Mihail Jora Concert Studio, International Classical Guitar Festival, Bucharest (February 9, 2005)
- Classical Guitar Recital, George Enescu Concert Studio, Hommage to George Georgescu Concert, Bucharest (July 17, 2003)
- Classical Guitar Recital, Mihail Jora Concert Studio, International Classical Guitar Festival, Bucharest (March 5 – 12, 2003)
- Christmas Concert (Performers Group Concert No.100), Sweden Embassy, Bucharest (December 11, 2002)
- The International Day of Books – Cervantes Institute, Bucharest (April 23, 2002).
- The International Day of Poetry, UNESCO, Bucharest, (March 15, 2002)
- Spring Song (Cântec de primăvară), with the Symbol choir of Romanian Patriarchate, Director Jean Lupu, Şuţu Palace, Bucharest (March 2, 2002)
- Recitals for Romanian Parliament, Ion Ratiu Romanian Parliament Club (December 12, 2001)
- Performers Group Concert, Hilton Hotel, Bucharest (November 19, 2001)
- Classical Guitar Recital at Cotroceni Palace (Cerchez Hall) during the concert of Mariana Nicolesco (December 8, 2000)
- Recitals at American Embassy, Italian Embassy, Marriott Hotel (winter 2000)
- Classical Guitar Evenings concert series (July, August 2000)
- Klassik im Sommer Tour - Hamburg, Barlt, Celle, Wedel, Ottersberg, Fehmarn, invited by Ars Pontem Foundation (July 16–18, 2000)
- Classical Guitar Recital, George Enescu High School, Bucharest (October 30, 1999)
