= Warren Nicholson =

Canadian classical guitarist

- Born: October 9, 1965 (age 59); Lachine, Quebec, Canada
- Education: St. Thomas High School, Oakville Trafalgar High School, McMaster University, Manhattan School of Music
- Occupations: Classical guitarist (classical music, latin American music, contemporary classical music)
- Years active: 1998–present

Warren Nicholson (born October 9, 1965) is a Canadian classical guitarist.

== Career ==
Nicholson was born on October 9, 1965, in Lachine, Quebec, Canada. He graduated from McMaster University in 1991 and the Manhattan School of Music in 1994. After graduation, he taught for four years at the Boys Choir of Harlem. He won the 1997 International Artists Auditions in New York City. The victory allowed him to perform at the Carnegie Recital Hall in 1998.

Warren played classical and church music for the Riverside Church Sunday Chapel Series (NYC) and Composer's Concordance. In Canada, he performed at Mac Master University's Visiting Artist Series, Music Mondays in Toronto, The Great Lakes Guitar Society, St Luke's Recitals in Ottawa etc. He performed at "Movimento Violao" (Guitar Movement) in São Paulo in Brazil.

Warren Nicholson has collaborated with: Toronto Children's Chorus, Mississauga Children's Choir, Etobicoke Philharmonic and Oakville Symphony. He released his first CD "Latin American Guitar Favorites" in 2013 for solo guitar and second CD "Spanish Miniatures" in 2018. Warren Nicholson worked with: Gene Pritsker, Arthur Kampela, Jeff Johnson and John Cuciurean.

== Discography ==
- Latin American Guitar Favourites (2013)
- Spanish Miniatures (2018)
- Sonidos del Sur (2021)
- Will I Win (Or Will You Lose) (2023)
- Love Theme from Only A Game (2023)
