= Igor Presnyakov =

Russian musician (born 1960)

Igor Presnyakov Игорь Пресняков
- Born: 8 May 1960 (age 65); Moscow, Russia SFSR, USSR (now Russia)
- Origin: Amsterdam, Netherlands
- Genres: Fingerstyle
- Occupation: Guitarist
- Instruments: Acoustic guitar, electric guitar, vocals
- Years active: 1970s–present
- Website: Igor Presnyakov's website

Igor Vitalyevich Presnyakov (Russian: И́горь Витальевич Преснякóв, IPA: [ˈiɡərʲ vʲɪˈtalʲjɪvʲɪtɕ prʲɪsʲnʲɪˈkof]; Dutch: Igor Vitaljevitsj Presnjakov; born 8 May 1960) is a Russian guitarist. He is best known for his covers of popular music songs.

Born in Moscow, Russia, Igor Presnyakov studied classical music at a nearby academy and would eventually graduate as both a guitarist and a conductor for ensembles. He relocated to the Netherlands to further his career, which has now spanned over 35 years. His unique acoustic guitar-style is influenced by various musical genres from Reggae, Rock and Roll, R&B, Country-western, Jazz and Heavy Metal.

Presnyakov has attracted significant popularity on YouTube since joining the video sharing platform in 2007; his uploads have been viewed more than 500 million times and have attracted more than 2.5 million subscribers.

== Albums ==
=== 2010 ===
- Chunky Strings

=== 2011 ===
- Acoustic Pop Ballads
- Acoustic Rock Ballads Covers

=== 2013 ===
- Iggyfied
