= Dennis Eveland =

American guitarist (born 1952)

Dennis Eveland (born July 3, 1952) is an American guitarist, electronic musician, bassist, composer, and engineer. He started performing at the age of 12. His first band, The Berlin Airlift, opened for Ted Nugent and the Amboy Dukes, Parliament and Funkadelic, and the Red, White & Blues Band.

== Biography ==
In 1972, Eveland moved to Los Angeles, CA and worked at Bud Friedman's Improv Comedy Club, opening for comedians with his "Django"-esque acoustic duo, Samartino and Eveland.

In 1978, he joined the Shieks of Shake, a popular local Los Angeles blues/psychedelia band, with Louis Lista (harp and vocals), John Sanborn (guitar), Paul Body (drums) as bassist, who released one 45 "Bullets in My Gun" on Mystic Records. The Shieks of Shake shared billings with Captain Beefheart, the Slits, X, the Blasters, Wall of Voodoo, Billy Vera and the Beaters, The Plugz, and many other LA based groups.

From 1978 to 1984, he performed on and off with the X-Streams a Phoenix-based ska/reggae band with Kurt Mayberry (guitar) Bob Steinhilber (drums) Lorainne Springer (vocals) Peter Tessensohn (bass) Mike Tempo (percussion).

Dennis formed the band The Hand with Detroit-based members John Jones (vocal) Greg Sieja (bass) Wayne Tarasoff (drums) Mike Cosola (guitar) Jeff Teitell (Keyboards) and Bruce Teitell (Vocals & Percussion).

- Addition: 7"-45 rpm stereo, dated 1983 Handsongs Publishing (Canoga Park, CA) # M-1235-6. Side A) "One Shot Deal" (3:32). Side B) "Love Hurts" (3:40). Players: Yusra Laughlin- vocals. Dennis Eveland- guitar. Wayne Tarasoff- drums. Dan Gruich- bass. Jeff Teitell- keyboards. Bruce Teitell- background vocals. Recorded at Motor City Studios. produced and arranged by Dennis Eveland.

A reformation of The Hand added Harvest Eveland (vocals) and a 45 entitled "One Shot Deal" was released on Madhouse Records.

Turning to electronic music and film scoring, He composed and performed on the documentaries "The Making of the Abyss" and The Making of "No Escape". Titles from these compositions also appeared on a CD release "No Pressure" on Wildcat Records.

With Harvey Robert Kubernik and New Alliance Records, a spoken word project, Dennis produced, engineered and performed on releases with Scott Richardson, Pleasant Gehman, Linda Albertano, Paul Body, Louis Lista, Wanda Coleman, Michelle Norte, Michelle T. Clinton, Marisela Norte, Bill Mohr, Joel Lipman, Harry E. Northup, and Tommy Swerdlow.

Scott Richardson's CD Tornado Souvenirs featured vocal tracks with Ray Manzarek, Ron Ashton, Robert Mitchum, and Jane Greer. Dennis supplied the electronic music tracts for Scott's "White Man In The Middle" and Jane Greer's "Eve's Lament".

== Discography ==
1981: The Hand "One Shot Deal"

1982: The Hand "Love Hurts"

1993: Dennis Eveland "No Pressure"

1993: Scott Richardson "Tornado Souvenirs"

1993: Joel Lipman "Down Your Street"

1993: Innings & Quarters" "Compilation"

1994: Pleasant Gehman "Ruined"

1994: Marisela Norte "Note and Word"

1994: Bill Mohr "Vehemence"

1994: Michelle T. Clinton "Blood as a Bright Color"

1994: Louie Lista "To Sleep with the Lights On"

1994: Linda J. Albertano "Skin"

1994: Joel Lipman "Down Your Street"

1993: Harry E. Northup "Personal Crime"

1994: Paul Body "Love is Like Rasputin"

1994: Tommy Swerdlow "Artaud and Exactas"

1993: Wanda Coleman "High Priestess of Word"

1995: Hollywood Joe "Jack of Hearts"

2012: The Sheiks of Shake "Live at the ON Club"

2012: Ludar "Live at Luna Park
