= Allied Artists Music Group =

American record label and music distributor

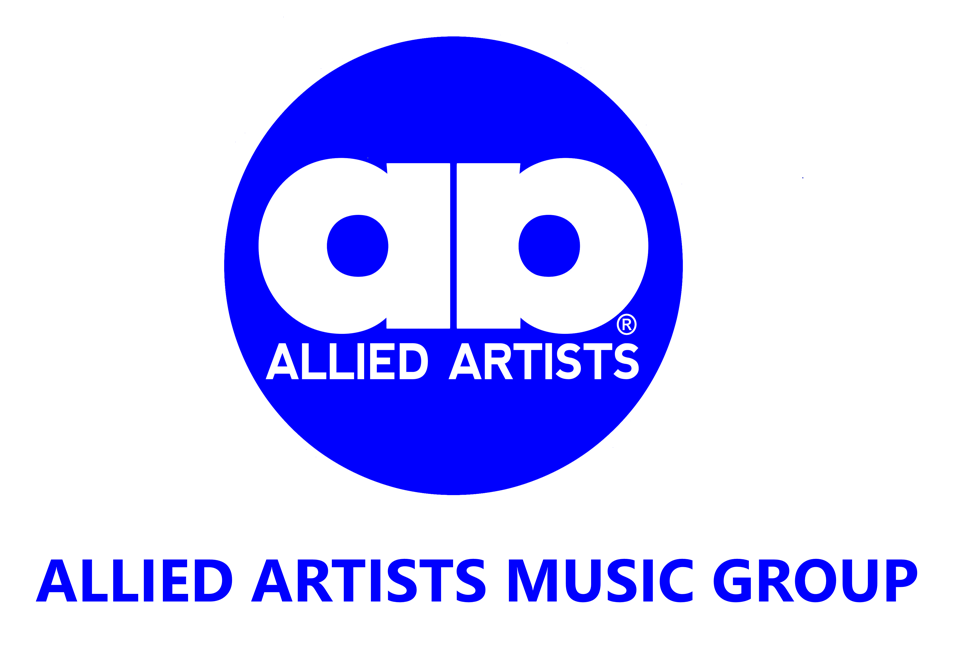

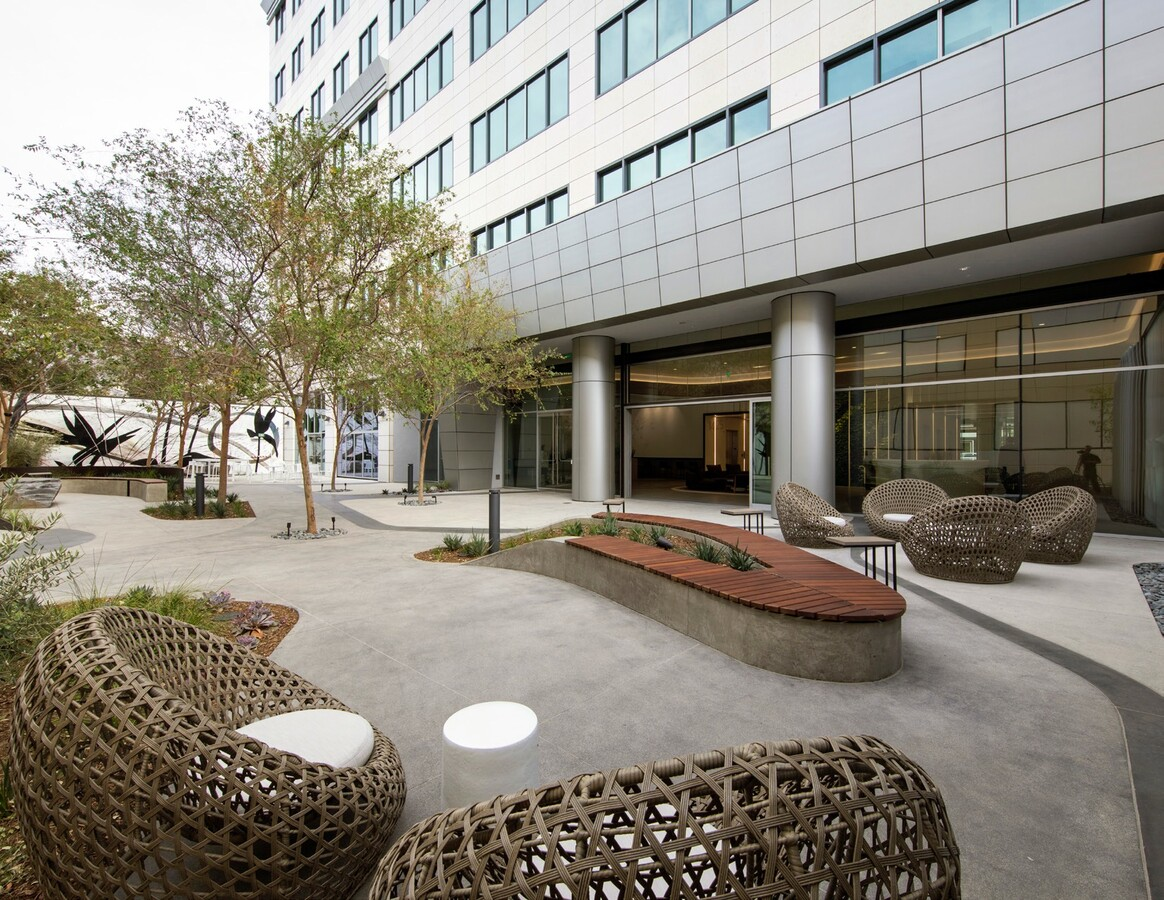
- AAMG's headquarters in Glendale, California
- Formerly: Allied Artists Records (1971–1999); Allied Artists Music (1965–1971); Allied Artists Pictures Records (1959–1965)
- Company type: Private
- Industry: Music; Soundtrack; Entertainment
- Founded: 1959; 67 years ago
- Headquarters: Los Angeles, California, United States
- Area served: Worldwide
- Key people: John Velasco, President
- Parent: Allied Artists Int'l, Inc.
- Website: www.alliedartists.com

Allied Artists Music Group (AAMG) is the U.S. based multinational music focused entertainment and record label arm of Allied Artists International, Inc. (AAI), headquartered in Glendale, California. In 1971, AAI's predecessor Allied Artists Pictures Corporation officially formed subsidiary Allied Artists Records. By 1999, Allied Artists Records encompassed numerous imprint labels, including the flagship Allied Artists Records, Allied Artists Music Co., Monogram Records, Vista Records and Brimstone Records. The record label is known for having released such historic motion picture soundtracks as Elvis Presley's 1965 "Tickle Me" and Liza Minnelli's 1972 "Cabaret." On the traditional recorded music side, the company is recognized for its releases of Latin heavy metal band Renegade's entire catalog, including 1983's "Rock 'n' Roll Crazy!" and Luis Cardenas' 1986 "Animal Instinct," among many others. In the year 2000, with sales of physical records (CDs & Vinyl) declining in lieu of digital downloads, Allied Artists Records consolidated all of its music related holdings into the newly branded "Allied Artists Music Group," becoming a formal division of its parent, AAI.

== History ==
=== Early history ===
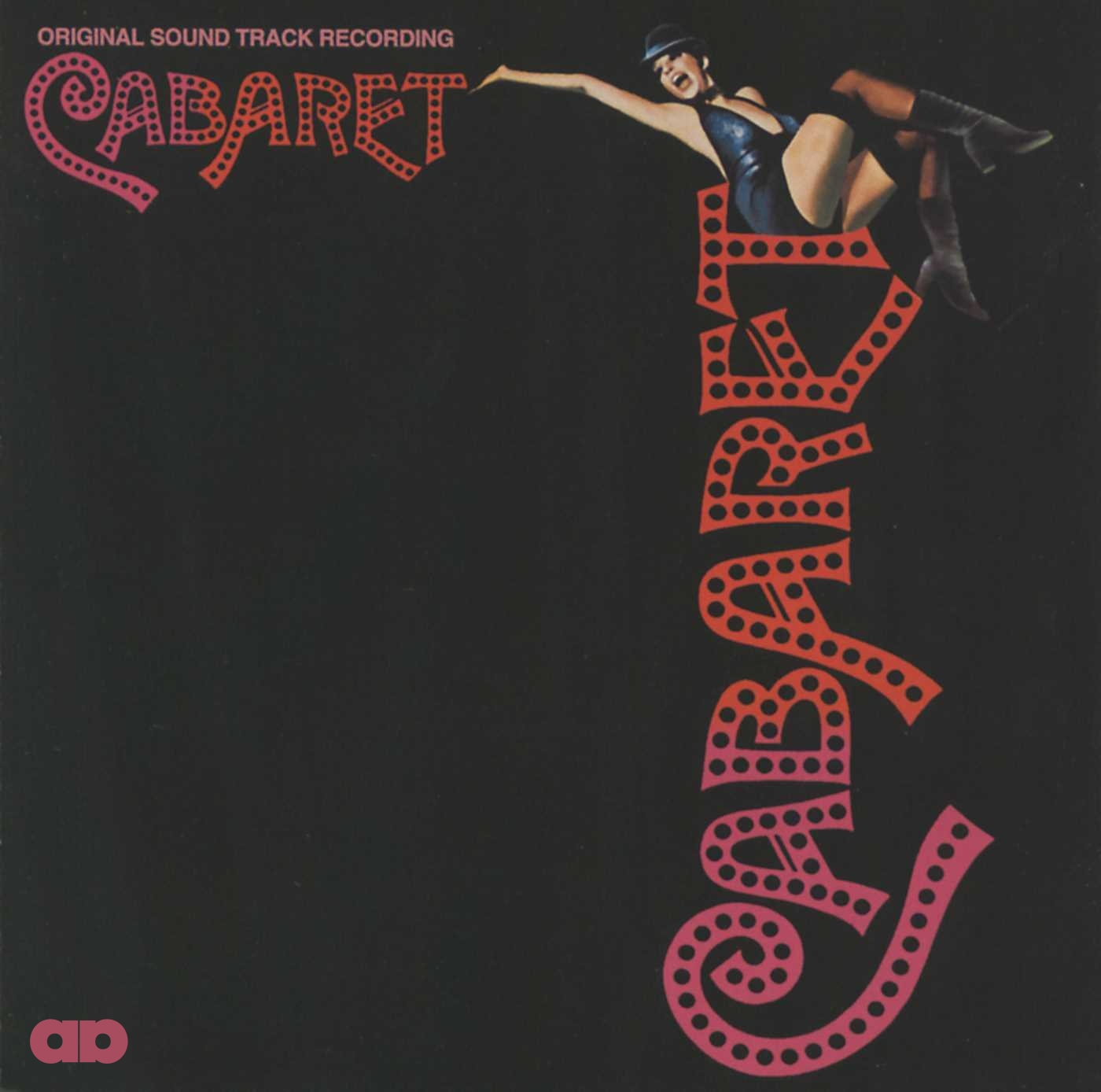
1972 Allied Artists LP Cover for Cabaret Soundtrack

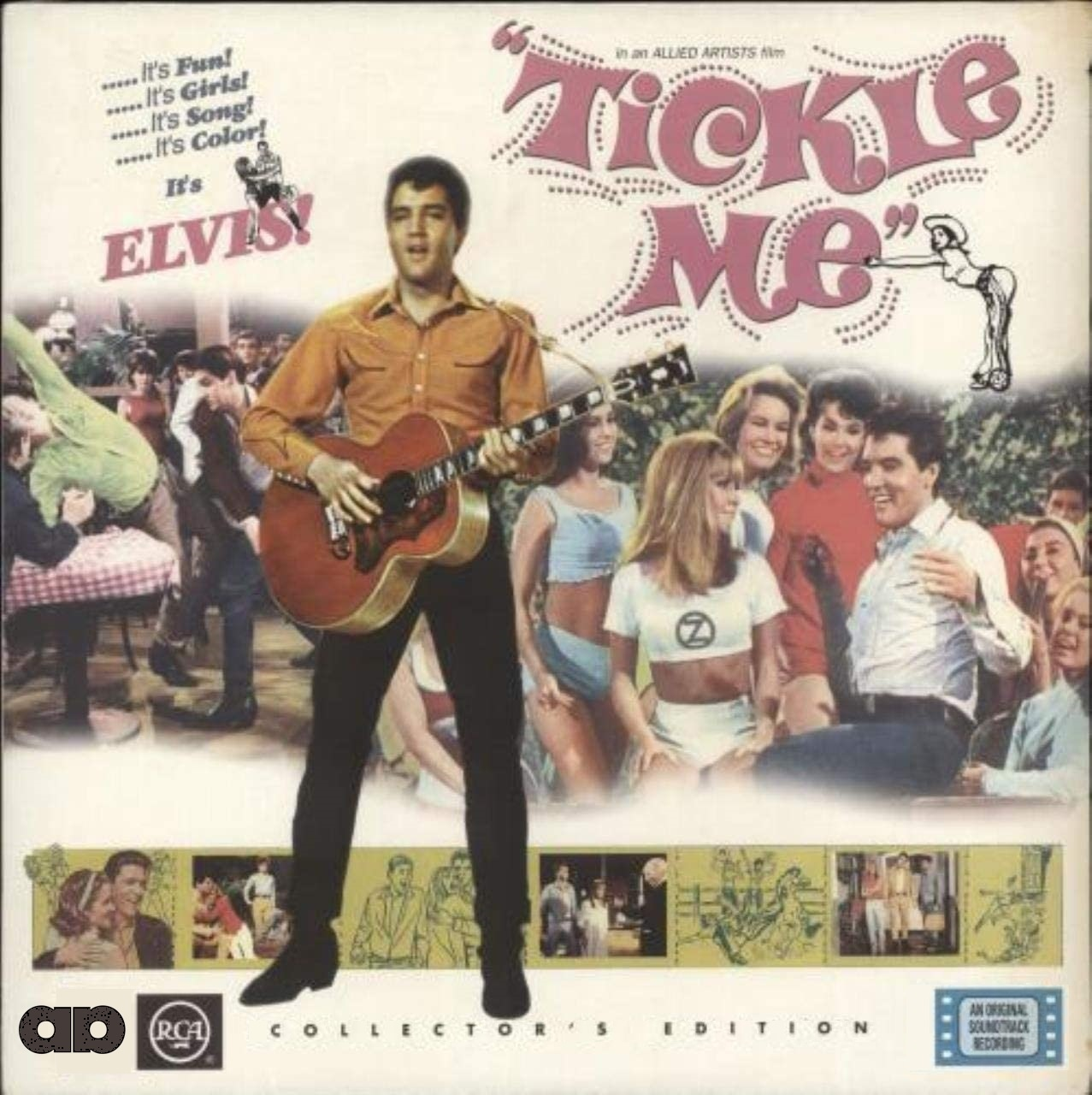
1965 Allied Artists LP Cover for Tickle Me Soundtrack

Prior to 1971, soundtracks were informally released under the "Allied Artists Records" or "Allied Artists Music" names. Allied Artists Records was officially formed by Allied Artists Pictures in 1971 to become the motion picture soundtrack releasing vehicle for its distributed motion pictures. Due to runaway production costs, Allied Artists Pictures was forced into bankruptcy in 1979. Allied Artists Records, which was an unaffected wholly owned subsidiary of Allied Artists Pictures, sought to expand its trademark and service mark rights to include all forms of entertainment, including those previously held by Allied Artists Pictures. By 1988, Allied Artists Records laid historical claim to recording artists such as Elvis Presley, Lionel Richie, Lawrence Welk, Bob Seger, and Ted Nugent. Allied Artists Records' historical roster and catalog include Exodus, Coolio, Luis Cardenas, David Hasselhoff and Renegade. In 2000, it was announced that Allied Artists Records would issue a Spanish-language recording by David Hasselhoff. Shortly thereafter, Allied Artists Records formally consolidated each of its imprint labels into "Allied Artists Music Group" in a cost-cutting measure designed to maximize distribution strength.

=== Current history and management ===
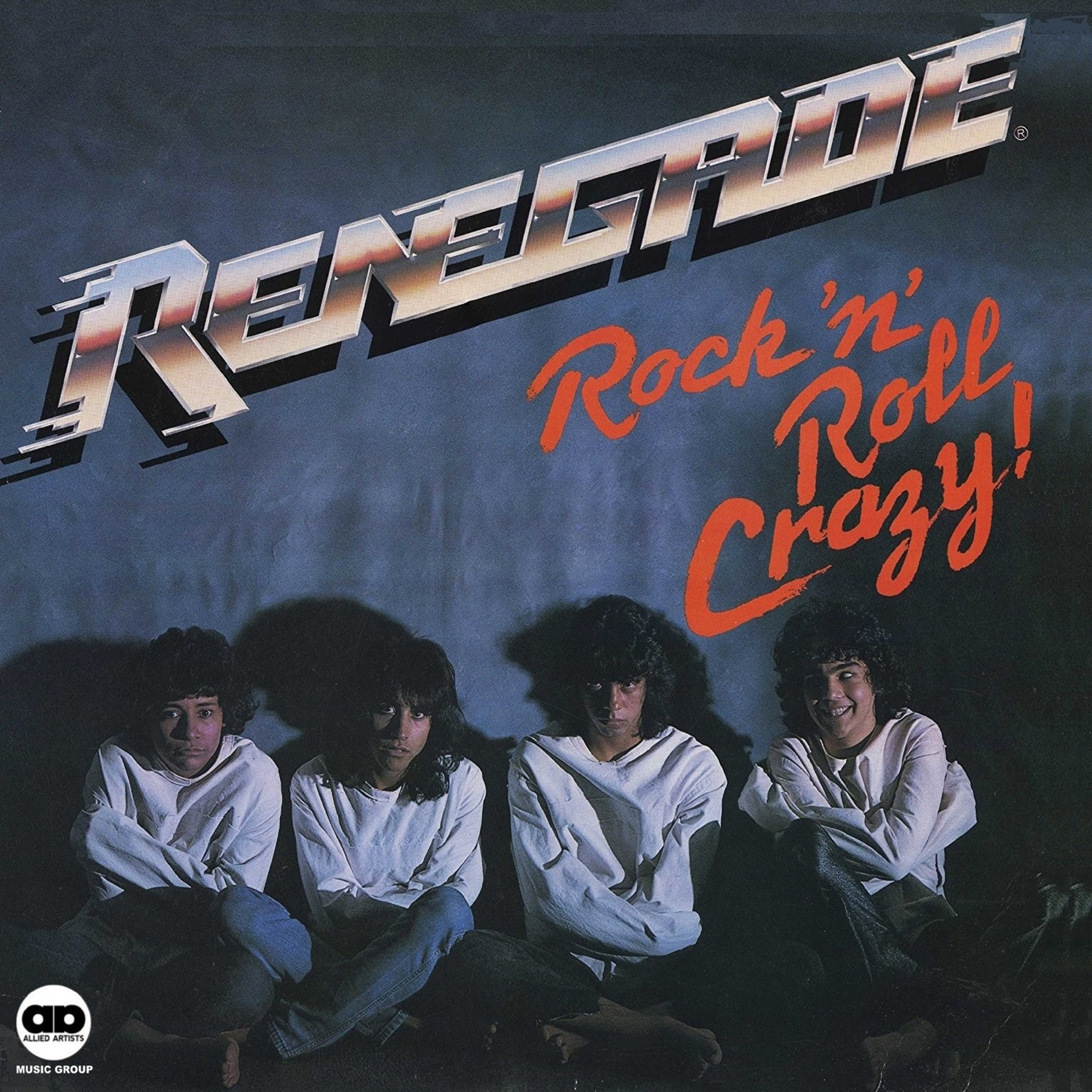
1983 AAMG LP Cover for Renegade's Rock 'n' Roll Crazy!

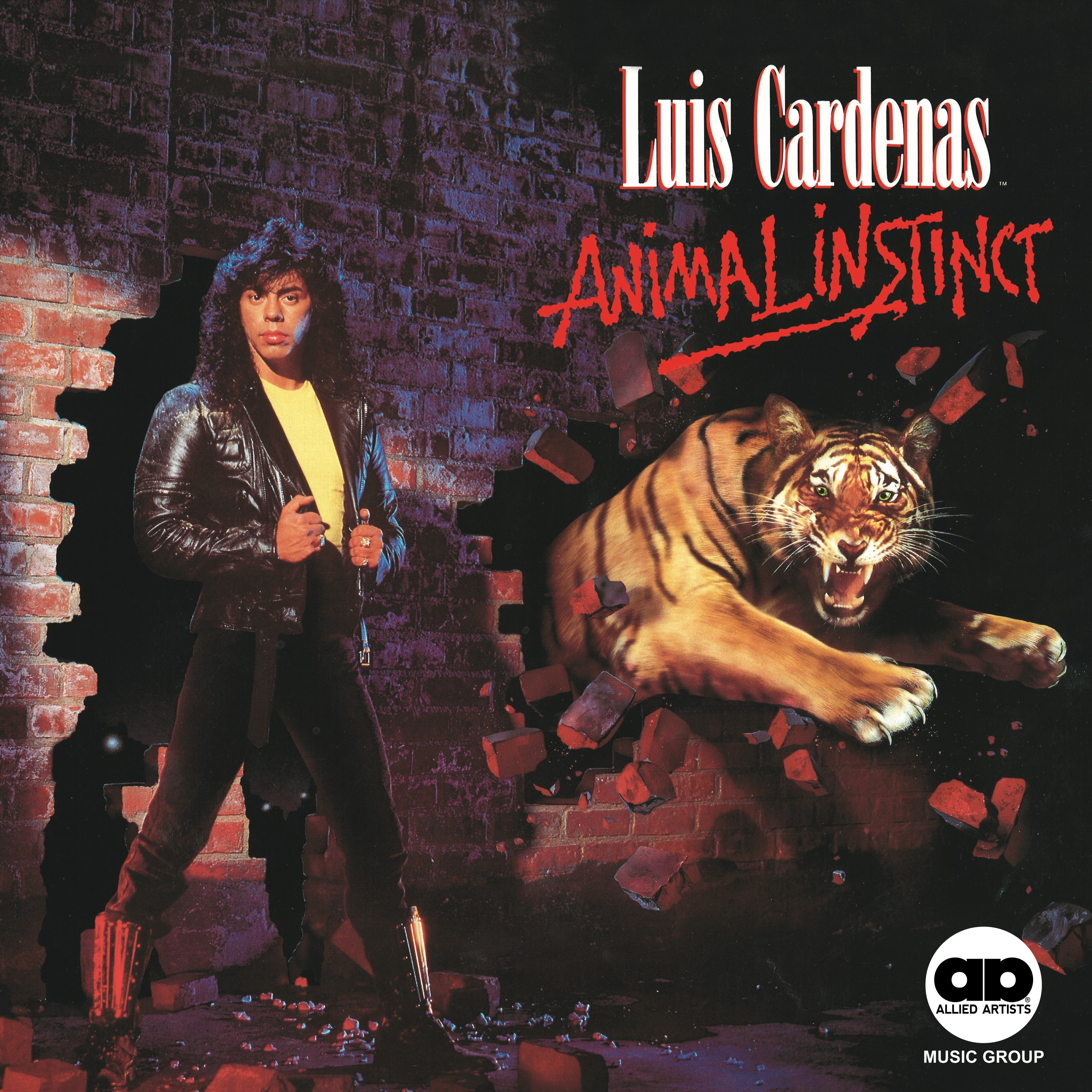
1986 AAMG LP Cover for Luis Cardenas' album cover for Animal Instinct

Shortly after the 2000 realignment of AAI's music holdings, Kim Richards, AAI's chief executive officer and chairman of the board, announced that former lawyer to The Beatles and co-manager of The Bee Gees, Robert Fitzpatrick had been named as AAMG's maiden president. Among Fitzpatrick's music contributions while helming AAMG were soundtracks for such box-office hits as Pulp Fiction, Remember the Titans and The 51st State. Fitzpatrick notably broadened AAMG's domestic distribution into a global distribution network. As part of the "Fitzpatrick Plan," existing home video licensing agreements held by Allied Artists Film Group would be converted into direct distribution for a new wholly owned, but specialized entity to be combined with existing distribution held by AAMG. Today, the home video distribution arm of Allied Artists Film Group has been merged with AAMG's music distribution network, to create "Allied Artists Music & Video Distribution" (AAMVD), with global reach and presence on every continent. Fitzpatrick was elevated to president of parent AAI in June of 2006, naming former managing director of Warner Bros. Records U.K., Stephan Bauer-Stace, as his replacement. Bauer had an extensive history with such music icons as Led Zeppelin, The Rolling Stones and Jeff Beck, which was a direction Richards envisioned for AAMG. Bauer was diagnosed with cancer in November of 2015, taking a leave of absence shortly thereafter. Longtime friend of both Richards and Bauer, John Velasco, former head of United Artists Music U.K., known for his decades of experience in the music industry, having played crucial roles in the careers of Michael Jackson, ABBA, ELO, John Denver, Marvin Gaye and Davy Jones, stepped in to manage AAMG during Bauer's absence. Bauer's health continued to decline until June of 2016 when he succumbed to the cancer. After Bauer's death, Richards announced that Velasco was being named permanent president of AAMG. Prior to Bauer's death, he signed Norwegian "Master Guitarist" Rocky Kramer to AAMG. Bauer died before Kramer's debut album "Firestorm" was released. Under Velasco's leadership, Kramer's first single "Rock Star" spawned a hit music video and reached Number One on the Global DRT Chart.

== Labels ==
The anchor AAMG label, Allied Artists Records, takes its name and history from the original motion picture soundtrack label by the same name, established by Allied Artists Pictures in 1971. Today, Allied Artists Records remains as a mainstream anchor imprint, together with its wholly autonomous target market imprints, Allied Artists Music Co., Monogram Records, Brimstone Records and Vista Records.

== Distribution ==
Allied Artists Pictures was among the first motion picture studios to self-distribute films for both itself and small independent film makers. In 1971, with the formation of Allied Artists Records, the company utilized Warner Bros. Records for domestic distribution of motion picture soundtracks. By the millennium, Allied Artists Records had developed its own robust global distribution network. As the distribution of motion pictures through major studios became cost prohibitive, Allied Artists Pictures began rediscovering its independent distribution roots. Simultaneous to restructuring the company's music holdings under Allied Artists Music Group, the motion picture holdings were restructured under Allied Artists Film Group. Both the music and film groups had their own forms of distribution, much of which overlapped. AAI, parent to both the film and music groups elected to merge both distribution arms into "Allied Artists Music & Video Distribution" (AAMVD). Today, all music and home video offerings are being distributed by way of the AAMVD global distribution network.
