= Vladimir Lyovkin =

Russian singer (1967–2024)

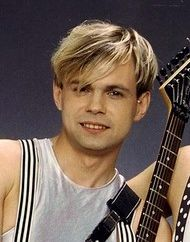
Lyovkin in the 1990s

Vladimir Aleksandrovich Lyovkin (Russian: Владимир Александрович Лёвкин; 6 June 1967 – 17 November 2024) was a Russian singer, known for being the lead vocalist of pop group Na Na from the group's formation until leaving in 1998.

== Biography ==
Lyovkin spent his early childhood abroad, in Potsdam. After school, he entered the Moscow Power Engineering Institute, but training was interrupted by a summons to the military commissariat. Lyovkin served in the ship repair battalion near Murmansk. In the years of service, he played guitar in an army ensemble.

Returning from the Russian army, Lyovkin entered Gnesinka.

As an experiment, decided to participate in the competition, organized by Bari Alibasov. So began his career in the group Na Na. In 1997 he acted in the music video for "Do Not, Do Not Cry" by Yevgeny Osin. At the same time, he had lymphatic cancer and underwent 10 years of treatment. In the summer of 1998 the contract with Na Na ended, and Lyovkin left the group.

In 2000, Lyovkin received an invitation from Vyacheslav Kachin to the band Kedbl. Lyovkin was the organizer, soloist, producer and manager of the group, but a serious illness forced him to leave the stage and he was hospitalized. Lyovkin underwent a successful operation in December 2003 and returned to active stage and social life.

From June 2006 until his death, Lyovkin engaged in social activities and was the director for culture of the public organization Union of Social Justice of Russia. He visited children's hospitals and medical centers, social shelters and orphanages.

Lyovkin died on 17 November 2024, at the age of 57, from acute leukemia. He is buried at the Troyekurovskoye Cemetery.
