= Na Na (Russian band) =

Russian boy band

Na-Na (NA-NAx)
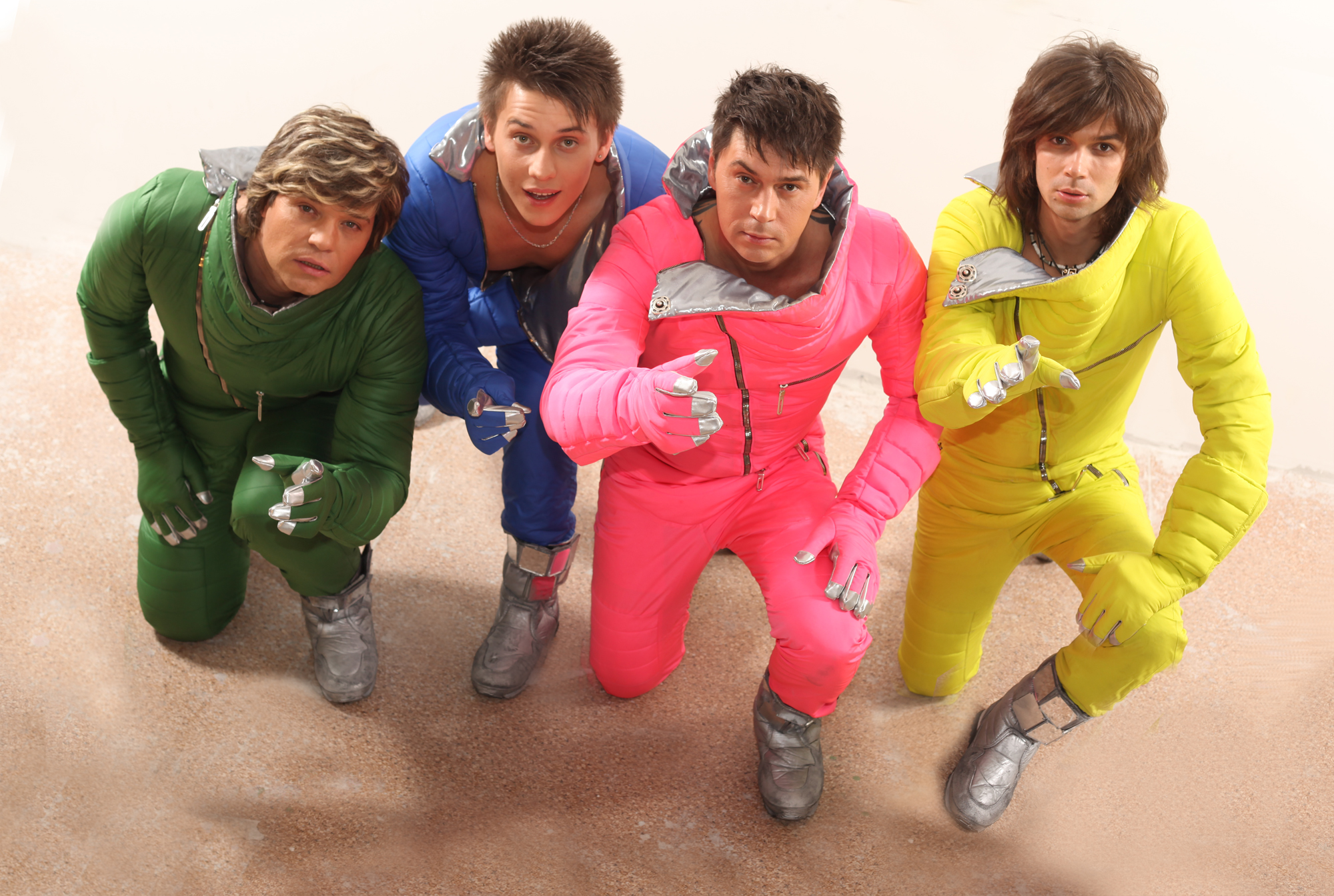
- The "golden line-up" of the group Na-Na: Politov, Asimov, Levkin, Zherebkin (1991)

Background information
- Origin: Moscow, Russia
- Genres: Pop, dance, pop-rock
- Years active: 1989–present
- Members: Vladimir Politov; Vyacheslav Zherebkin; Sergey Grigoriev; Oleg Korshunov
- Past members: Valery Yurin; Vladimir Lyovkin; Vladimir Asimov; Pavel Sokolov
- Website: groupnana.ru

Na Na (Russian: Ha-Ha, Russian pronunciation: [na na], also known as Na-Na or NA-NAx) is a Russian boy band founded in 1989 by its manager Bari Alibasov. They are known for the songs "Deserted Beach" and "Faina".

== History ==
=== Formation of the group ===
The group Na-Na was conceived by Bari Alibasov as early as 1988. His vision was for the group to perform in the style of disco-pop while incorporating elements from other genres such as rock, jazz, and folk rock. Alibasov designed the stage personas of the group members as young musicians aged 18–25, who could sing, had charisma, acting talent, and dynamic stage presence. Recalling his vision, Alibasov stated: "I needed versatile artists. I was planning to create a show."

Soon, Alibasov, along with entrepreneur Anis Mukhamedshin, announced auditions for the new group through the newspaper Moskovsky Komsomolets. Over 700 people participated. Alibasov selected only two candidates: Vladimir Lyovkin and Alexander Zaporozhets. Lyovkin recalled: "I came in, plugged in my guitar, started singing my song, sang a verse and a chorus. And someone behind the mixing console said, 'Come back in two days — the first rehearsal will take place.'"

The initial lineup included Vladimir Lyovkin (vocals, rhythm guitar) and Alexander Zaporozhets (keyboards, vocals), alongside former members of Alibasov's previous group Integral: Valery Yurin (vocals, lead guitar) and Marina Khlebnikova (vocals). Shortly thereafter, the group was joined by Andrey Ktitarev (keyboards), Igor Pavlenko (saxophone), Alexander Karpukhin (bass guitar, vocals), and Valery Burneyko (drums, vocals). Musical direction was handled by Sergey Shmelyov from Integral.

Rehearsals took place at the Isadora Duncan Theatre in Moscow and lasted 14–16 hours per day. Choreography and stage movement were developed by Nikolai Dobrynin and Anna Terekhova, actors from the Roman Viktyuk Theatre. The stage show was directed by avant-garde director Sergey Gelsinforsky, who had collaborated with Integral. Repertoire selection was personally overseen by Alibasov.

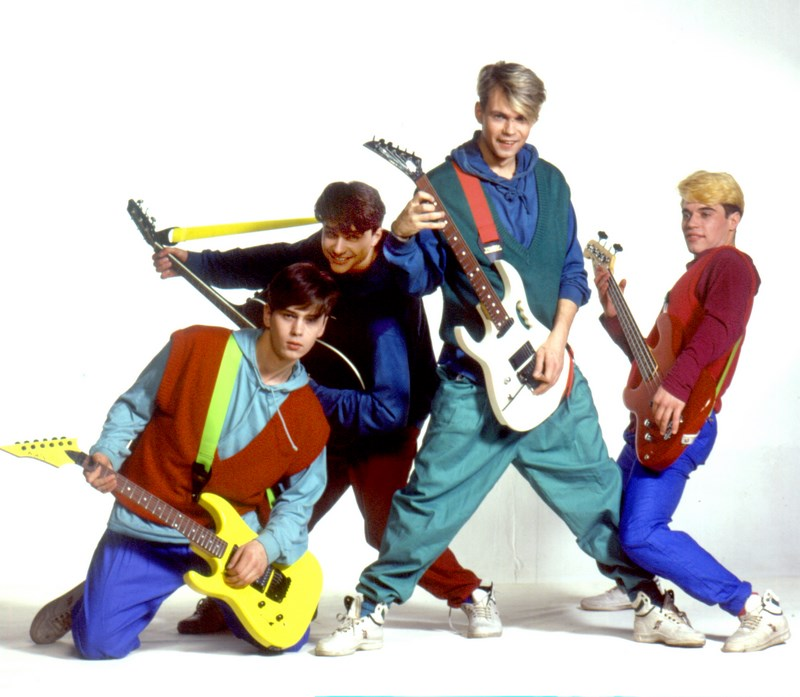
The "golden lineup" of Na Na in 1992

=== 1989 ===
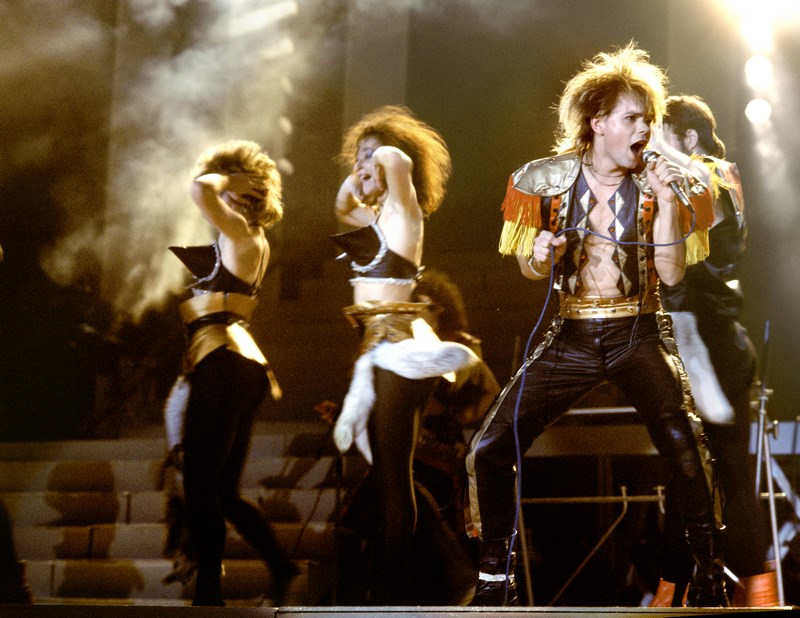
First public appearance of Na-Na (1989)

In June 1989, the international pop music festival "Face to Face" was held in Moscow, featuring European music and film stars. On June 6, Na-Na performed "Devchonka s Mashmeta" and "Pustynny Plyazh". Host Oleg Marusev allegedly inspired the group's name, exclaiming "Na, na..." backstage when asked for cigarettes. Following their performance, Na-Na entered the top ten of the Vechernyaya Moskva chart, where critics praised their success. By year's end, the group was named "Discovery of the Year" by the Musical Marathon feature of the same newspaper.

In September 1989, "Pustynny Plyazh" entered the Soundtrack chart. In November, Na-Na performed in Czechoslovakia as part of the "Days of Moscow in Prague" festival, sharing the stage with jazz orchestra Karel Vlach and His Orchestra. A notable incident involved the prohibition of their song "Suzanna", attributed to dissident poet Jiři Suchý.

By late 1989, the group recorded their first mini-album featuring "Pustynny Plyazh", "Medovyy Mesyats (Ne Zhenis)", "Ty i Ya", and "Babushka Yaga". The first and last tracks charted on Soundtrack, and music videos were produced. Work began on a full album released in 1991.

=== 1990–1991 ===
In 1990, lead vocalist Alexander Zaporozhets left for Leonid Agutin's band while new member Vladimir Politov joined as a bassist and vocalist. Na-Na won the 50x50 music show in November 1990 with "Babushka Yaga", marking the first unanimous win across all jury panels. Their December performance of "Eskimos and Papuans" at Pesnya-90 showcased their theatrical flair, sparking controversy but solidifying their fame.

In April 1991, the group debuted the provocative "History of One Benefice" show at the State Kremlin Palace. Their artistic decisions, including partially nude performances, drew significant attention. That year, they released their first album, Na-Na 91, and starred in the film Sun, Air, and Na-Na directed by Zaal Kakabadze.

By late 1991, the lineup expanded to include Vyacheslav Zherebkin and Vladimir Asimov, forming what the press called the "golden lineup." Instrumentalists like Andrey Ktitarov (keyboards) and a new dance troupe supported the group's performances.

=== 1992–1993 ===
In 1992, Na-Na toured Siberia and the Far East, becoming the first pop group to perform at the State Kremlin Palace. They released their second album, Faina, with the title track dominating charts like Star Track for over three years. The music video for "Faina" stirred controversy and was briefly banned.

That year also marked their first international tour in Germany, Turkey, and the United States, including a residency at New York's "Rasputin" club. Despite their busy schedule, the group continued to release new music, with Vladimir Asimov leading in 1993 with "Edu k Milenkoy."

=== 1994–1996 ===
On January 14, 1994, the band Na-Na won the Russian national music award Ovatsiya in the categories "Best Pop Group of the Year" and "Hit of the Year" for their song "Faina". In January, the band held successful concerts in Bulgaria and participated in the "Discovery-94" festival in Varna.

The group joined the organization "FIDOF" under UNESCO and signed contracts to represent the organization in the United States, Portugal, and Macedonia (Greece). During the summer, they performed again at Slavyanski Bazaar, and in August 1994, the band gave concerts in Berlin's central square and the "Friedrichstadt-Palast" to mark the withdrawal of Soviet troops from Germany. In October, Na-Na was invited as honorary guests to the "MakFest-94" festival in Macedonia (Greece), and in November, they performed in New York City again. At the end of 1994, the band participated in Alla Pugacheva's "Rozhdestvenskiye vstrechi" (Christmas Meetings). According to Vladimir Politov, "In 1994, we gave 865 concerts," while Vyacheslav Zherebkin noted, "We averaged three concerts a day, starting at 1 p.m. with full venues."

In 1995, the band completed their album Na-Nastalgia. The premiere of the eponymous show took place at the State Central Concert Hall "Rossiya" in Moscow, featuring over 200 performers, including ethnic drummers from Kenya, African-American dancers from Las Vegas, indigenous musicians from Bolivia, Oleg Lundstrem's jazz orchestra, the symphony orchestra led by People's Artist of the USSR Veronika Dudarova, and the Chukotka ensemble Ergyron. The show was musically directed by composer Vladimir Dolenko and Nina Savitskaya. The Na-Nastalgia show continued in the Yubileyny concert hall in Saint Petersburg and toured across Russia and internationally. In June 1995, Na-Na performed at the Kinotavr festival in Sochi. In December, the group was invited to Thailand by members of King Rama IX's family to celebrate the 50th anniversary of his coronation. Supported by the royal family, the band released the album Flowers in Thailand, featuring songs in Thai. A royal printing house published a photo album of the group, and four documentary films were produced about the show.

=== 1996–1997 ===
In early 1996, Na-Na continued touring with their Na-Nastalgia program. Journalists from TV-6 Moscow created a series of reports about the group's tour life, which aired several times a week. A two-part TV film, Strana Na-Na (Country of Na-Na), was also produced. The group embarked on an international tour commemorating Kazakhstan's capital relocation from Almaty to Astana. The tour included performances across Kazakhstan, concluding at Luzhniki Stadium in Moscow, followed by shows in Paris, Berlin, and Tel Aviv.

In 1996, the album Noch bez sna was released, featuring 12 tracks including hits such as "Edu k milenkoy" and "Esli b ne bylo nochey" as well as new songs. Two other albums, Vsya zhizn' – igra and 17 luchshikh pesen, were also released that year.

In spring 1997, work began on the new concert show Prikin', da?!, with elaborate costumes designed by Vyacheslav Zaitsev, Natalia Naftalieva, and Yuri Ars, and sets by Boris Krasnov. Illusionist Anatoly Nemetov choreographed the magical tricks. The program toured Russia, Israel, Canada, the United States, Thailand, and Sri Lanka, featuring the debut of soloist Pavel Sokolov. In June 1997, the group performed at the Kinotavr festival in Sochi. The album and a music video for Prikin', da?! were released.

In September 1997, Na-Na signed with Sony Music Entertainment to record the album Those Were the Days for the French market. It featured multiple arrangements of the song "Dorogoy dlinnoiu", but the release was halted due to copyright issues.

=== 1998–1999 ===
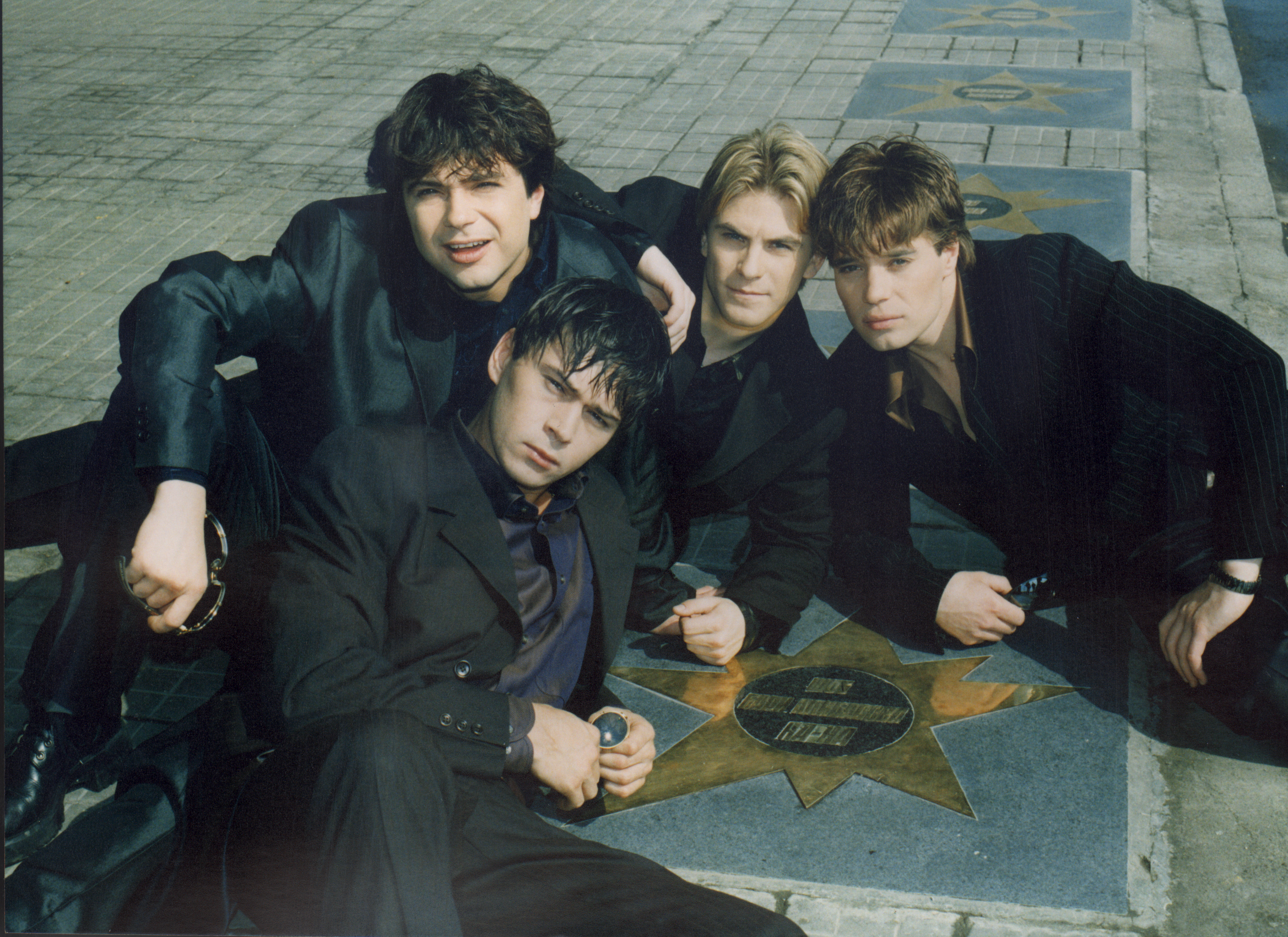
Na-Na's star on Star Square in Moscow (1998)

On April 26, 1998, Na-Na received a personalized star on Star Square at the State Central Concert Hall Russia. That same day, the first international fan forum, I Love Na-Na, took place with notable guests including Arkady Vainer and Anatoly Karpov. Later that year, a star was laid for the group in Atkarsk. The Russian Assembly of Nobility granted noble titles to the group members and their producer Bari Alibasov. Na-Na also won their ninth Ovation award.

In 1998, bassist Leonid Semidyanov joined the group. On June 10, they performed at the international presentation of Astana as Kazakhstan's new capital. President Nursultan Nazarbayev awarded Alibasov a commemorative medal for the event. The song "Boz Jorga" became a hit in Kazakhstan.

In August 1998, the album Vsya zhizn' – igra was released, featuring hits and remakes of Alla Pugacheva’s songs. Under the Na-Na brand, products like cologne and chewing gum were also introduced.

In February 1999, Vladimir Lyovkin left the group to form the punk band Kedy. The group returned to its original four-member lineup: Vladimir Politov, Vladimir Asimov, Vyacheslav Zherebkin, and Pavel Sokolov.

=== 2000–2001 ===
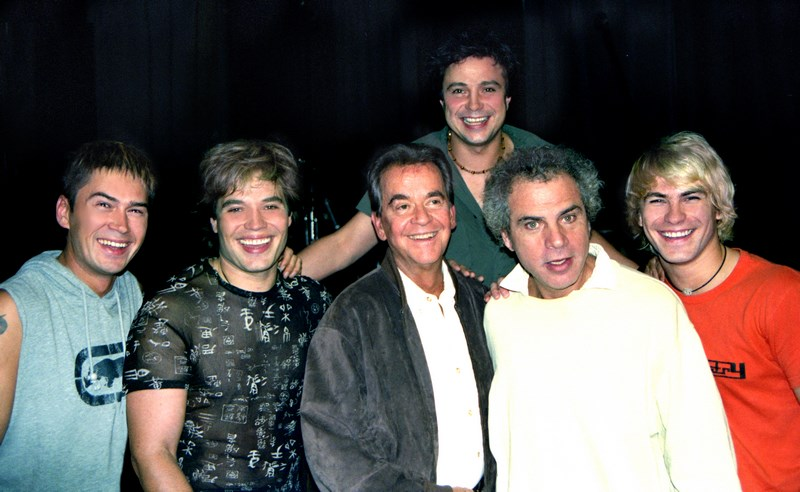
Na-Na with Dick Clark, founder of Dick Clark Productions, and producer Larry Klein (Los Angeles, 2001)

In 2000, Na-Na signed a contract with Dick Clark Productions.

According to Bari Alibasov, the chairman of Warner Brothers at the time, Less Baider, proposed the idea of recording the first planetary anthem in space. The project involved sending one of the soloists of Na-Na to Earth's orbit equipped with recording equipment to create an anthem featuring a "star performer" from every continent. This recording would be broadcast worldwide.

The group began preparations for the space flight, undergoing medical examinations at the Institute of Biomedical Problems of the Russian Academy of Sciences. In June 2001, Na-Na passed tests at the Gagarin Cosmonaut Training Center, confirming their fitness for space travel.

The project was sponsored by the Dutch company Heineken Holding, led by Freddy Heineken. Support from Russia included Minister of Culture Mikhail Shvydkoy and head of Rosaviakosmos, Yuri Koptev. The song for the project was selected by producers, including Robert Fitzpatrick, who had worked with The Beatles. However, after Freddy Heineken's death on January 3, 2002, the project was discontinued.

=== 2002–2008 ===
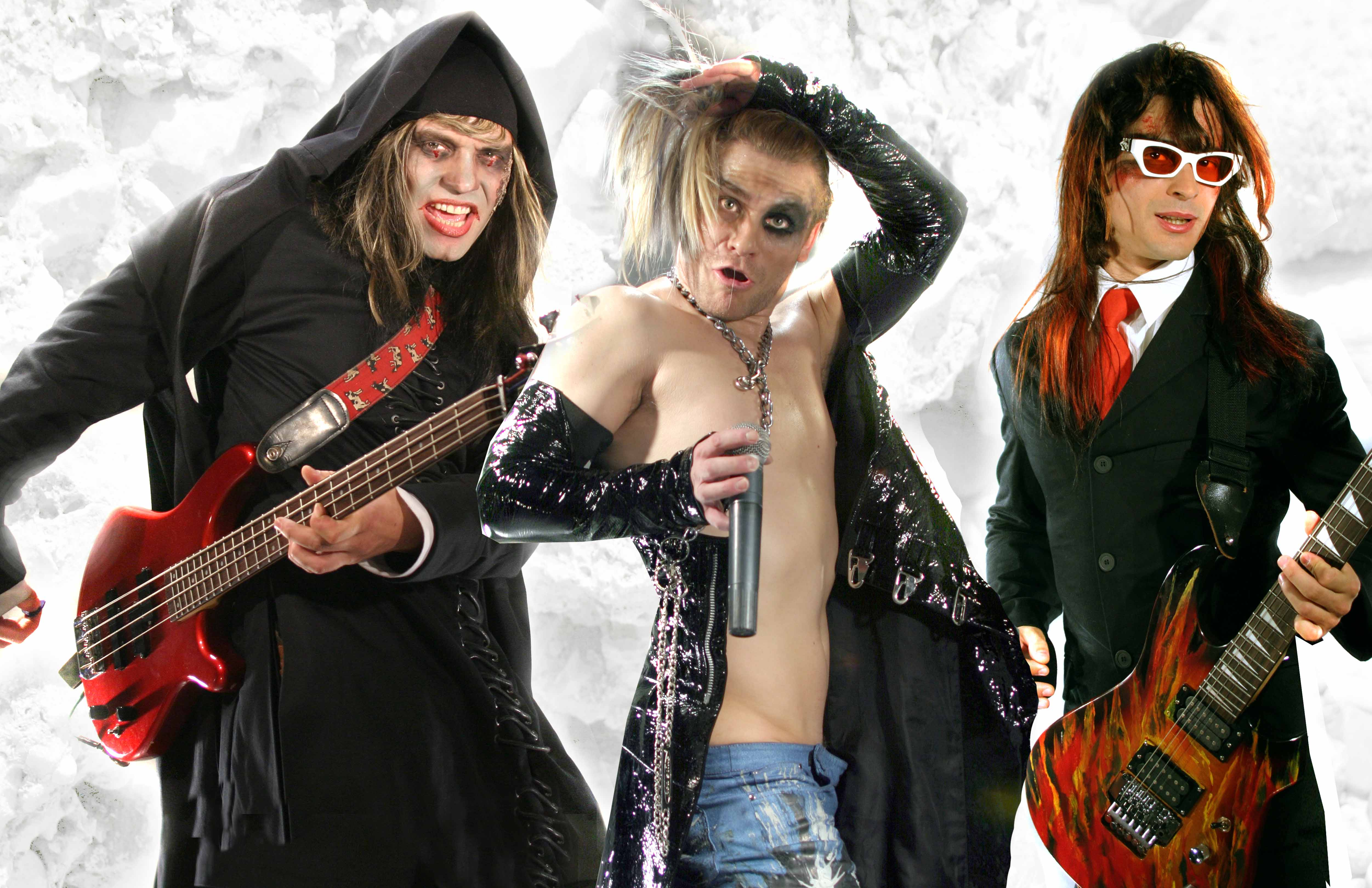
Na-Na in the Big Bang project: Zherebkin, Sokolov, Semidyanov (2003)

From 2002 to 2006, Na-Na toured extensively in Russia and abroad. In 2003, Vladimir Asimov left the group to pursue a solo career. Bari Alibasov initiated the musical project Big Bang featuring members of Na-Na. Leonid Semidyanov rejoined the group and participated in Big Bang, in which the band members embodied elements, forces of nature, and animals. According to Alibasov, Big Bang was intended for the American market, with interest from Dick Clark and Warner Brothers chairman Less Bider. However, the project was halted when its investor unexpectedly withdrew. As a result, Semidyanov had to leave the group.

In spring 2007, Na-Na participated in the Days of Slavic Culture and Literacy festival in Bulgaria. Around this time, Alibasov began work on the Shock Show, which included the ballet group Rasiski. According to Alibasov, the show depicted a conflict between men and women, symbolizing the struggle between the living and the inanimate. The group launched the Bari 60, Us – 18 tour with the new program. The Shock Show tour premiered in 2008 at Moscow's Golden Ring Theatre, with a concert lasting over three hours. The group toured the Far East, Siberia, and the Volga Region. The Shock Show continued the themes of Big Bang, with Alibasov describing it as an exploration of death and complex relationships between men and women. The group toured internationally with the program, performing in Cyprus, Germany, Poland, Turkey, Bulgaria, at the 2008 Summer Olympics in Beijing, and at the opening of the "Year of Russia" in Bulgaria, attended by presidents Georgi Parvanov of Bulgaria and Vladimir Putin of Russia.

In 2008, the album Shock Show was released.

PS Project (2008)

In June 2008, Pavel Sokolov left the group. Alibasov recruited new members Oleg Korshunov and Sergey Grigoryev. Two months later, the group performed at an international arts festival in Hohhot, China.

=== 2011–present ===
Members of the group were aboard Kolavia Flight 348, which burst into flames after an engine fire while taxiing for takeoff on January 1, 2011, killing 3 and injuring 43. All group members escaped unharmed.

In 2024, Na Na continued to tour starring Vladimir Politov and Vyacheslav Zherebkin, and newest member Mikhail Igonin.

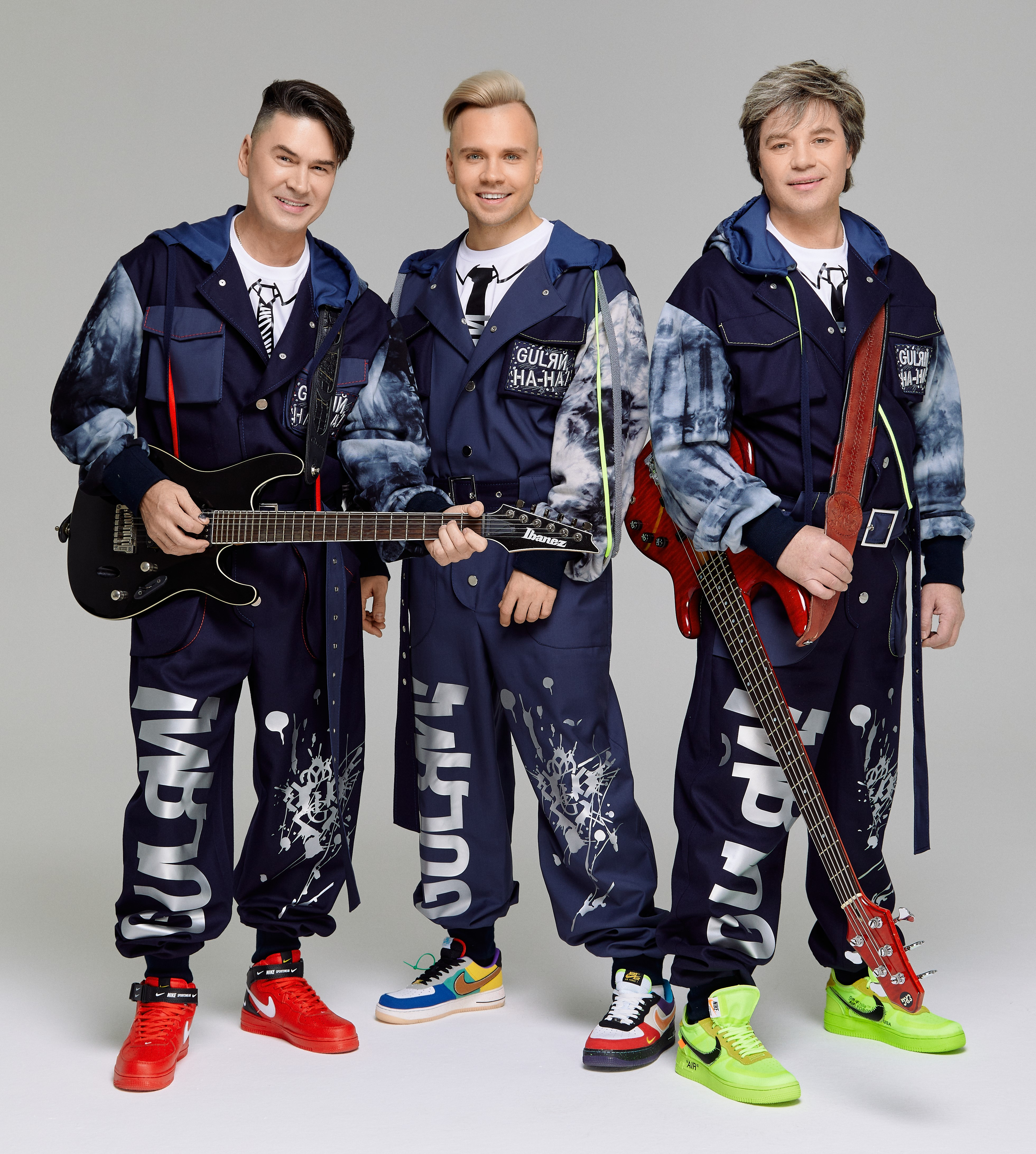
The current Na Na in 2022

Lyovkin died on November 17, 2024, at the age of 57, from acute leukemia. His death was confirmed by his wife.

== Members ==
Current

- Vladimir Politov – lead guitar, vocals (1990–present)
- Vyacheslav Zherebkin – bass guitar, vocals (1991–present)
- Mykhail Igonin – vocals (2008–2014) drums, (2014–present)

Former

- Vladimir Lyovkin – vocals (1989–1998; died 2024)
- Valery Yurin – (1989–1992)
- Marina Khlebnikova – (1989–1990)
- Pavel Sokolov – vocals (1989–1997) ballet dancer, (1997–2008)
- Vladimir Asimov – (1991–2003)
- Oleg Korshunov – (2008–2014)
- Sergey Grigoriev – (2008–2014)
- Leonid Semidyanov – vocals, saxophone (1998–2003) bass guitar, (2003–2005, 2015–2022)

Timeline
