= Rocky Kramer =

Norwegian rock musician

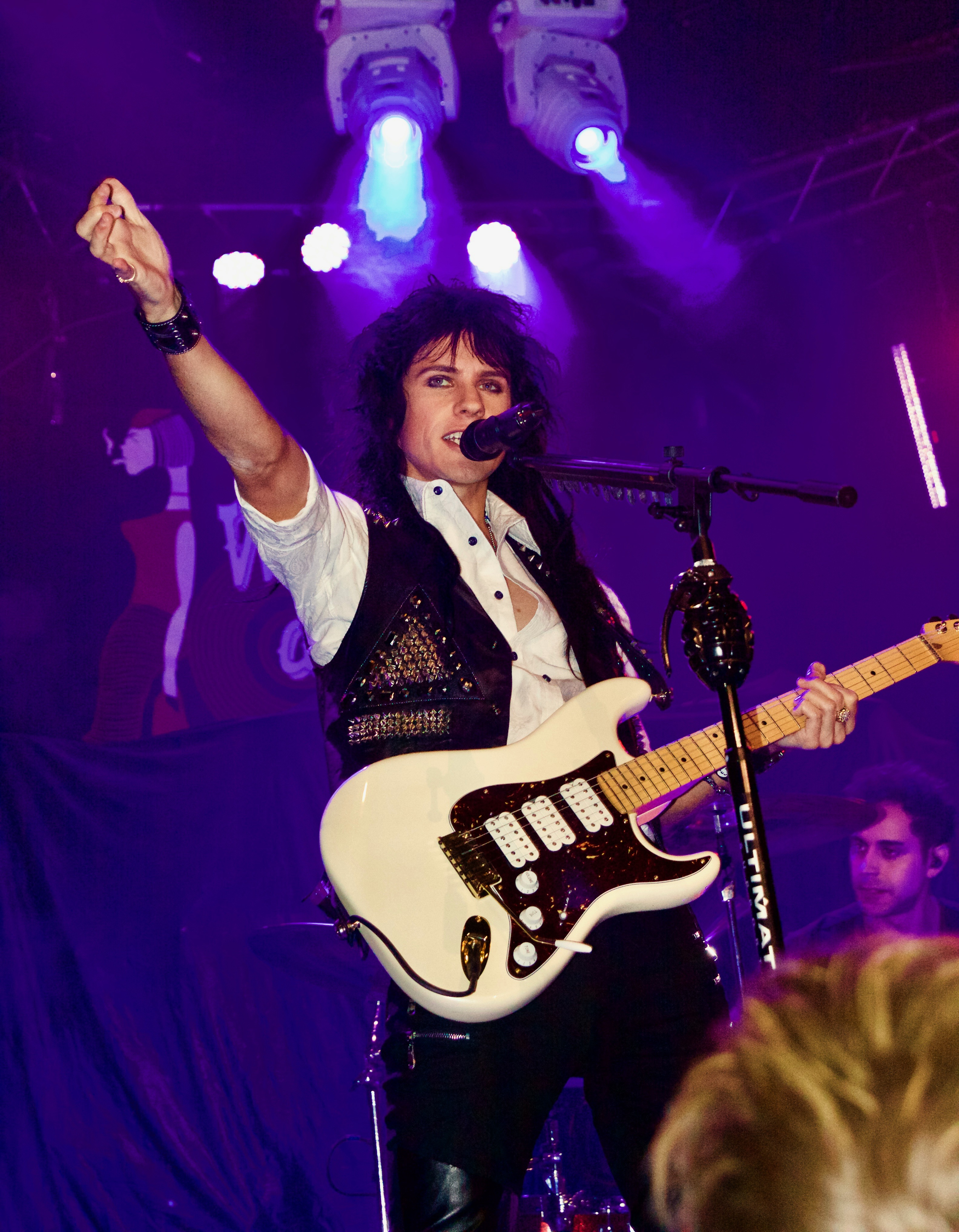
- Rocky Kramer in concert 2018
- Born: Sindre Langhelle; August 3, 1990 (age 36); Trondheim, Norway
- Occupations: Musician; singer; songwriter; record producer
- Years active: 2012–present
- Musical career
- Genres: Heavy metal; neoclassical metal; hard rock
- Instruments: Vocals, guitar
- Label: Allied Artists Music Group
- Kramer's voice from the Allied Artists Program Rock & Roll Tuesdays, EP2.26, March 23, 2021
- Website: rockykramer.com

Sindre Langhelle (/ˈsɪndrɛ ˈlɑːŋhələ/; born August 3, 1990), known professionally as Rocky Kramer (/ˈrɒki ˈkreɪmər/), is a Norwegian-American guitarist, singer, songwriter, composer and bandleader from Trondheim who is now based in Los Angeles. In 2018, Kramer became more widely known when he headlined the Seattle Hempfest. The next year, he released the single "Rock Star" from his debut album Firestorm, together with a well-received animation over live-action music video, exceeding a million views on Facebook. "Rock Star" reached number 1 on the Global DRT Chart and was nominated for a Hollywood Music in Media Award. Following release of Firestorm, Kramer performed at the 2019 Sturgis Motorcycle Rally in Sturgis, South Dakota, before joining Buckcherry's tour throughout the United Kingdom. In 2021, it was announced that Kramer had been cast to play the character "Lars Olsen" in the Aaron Lee Lopez directed feature film Rockin' in Time, due in theaters in 2025. Kramer plays and endorses Fender Stratocaster guitars. In February of 2024, Kramer returned to East West Studios in Hollywood, with a brand new band to record an upcoming album entitled "Alone In The Rain" along with the Rockin' In Time movie Soundtrack. In March of 2026, it was announced that Kramer had been named the new lead guitarist and backup vocalist for THE KNACK, a legacy band supporting original bass player Prescott Niles.

== Early life ==
Kramer was born to Bjørn Langhelle and Ingjerd Langhelle (née Andresen) in Trondheim, Norway. He grew up in a musical family, as his mother was a skilled pianist and vocalist, while his father was first violinist in the Trondheim Symphony Orchestra. Kramer's older brother is Norwegian jazz musician Ståle Langhelle. When Kramer was five, his mother died of cancer. Kramer began his musical career playing the piano and violin, before switching to guitar after listening to Kiss and AC/DC. He cites Yngwie Malmsteen as a key guitar influence and Pink Floyd for general inspiration. As a teenager he was a member of the band Armed Science, which reached the final of the Ungdommens kulturmønstring or UKM talent show.

== Career ==
After his teenage years, Kramer moved to Los Angeles, California, to pursue music. He was soon signed by the Allied Artists Music Group. Kramer was granted word and trade marks for his stage name "ROCKY KRAMER", as well as a logo bearing the same name on June 11, 2013. Working together with his band and noted producer Kim Richards, he released his debut album Firestorm on August 9, 2019, celebrated with a "star-studded" red carpet release party, held on a sound stage in Los Angeles on July 30, 2019, that was catered by In & Out Burger. On April 23, 2019, it was announced that Kramer had signed with TKO Booking Agency. Immediately after the 2019 album release party, Kramer played August 4, 5 and 6 at the 2019 Sturgis Motorcycle Rally in Sturgis, South Dakota, followed by a tour of the United Kingdom with Buckcherry, playing at venues such as the O_{2}. Kramer's first single "Rock Star," from the Firestorm album reached No. 1 on the Global DRT Chart on October 5, 2019. Prior to releasing the "Rock Star" single, Kramer released "a humorous music video that pokes fun at 1980's era MTV style productions, as seen through the eyes of an animated 13-year-old "Little Rocky," dreaming of becoming a 'Rock Star!'"

On April 7, 2020, the weekly Kramer-hosted live broadcast, "Rock & Roll Tuesdays with Rocky Kramer", premiered on Twitch. During the COVID-19 pandemic lockdown, Kramer looked for ways to entertain from home. He had previously released a video of Comfortably Numb from Pink Floyd's The Wall, a tribute to David Gilmour. Kramer chose Twitch because it was a "great way to stay in touch with fans and ... develop new fans" During Kramer's October 13, 2020, Rock & Roll Tuesdays program, he premiered a cover video tribute to Yngwie Malmsteen, of the "Baroque & Roll" instrumental from Malmsteen's fourteenth studio album, Attack!!. Throughout the pandemic lockdown, Kramer has released additional cover videos of Foo Fighters "The Pretender", Linkin Park "Breaking The Habit," Edwyn Collins "A Girl Like You," CHVRCHES "Keep You on My Side," Queen "The Show Must Go On," and Genesis "Mama."

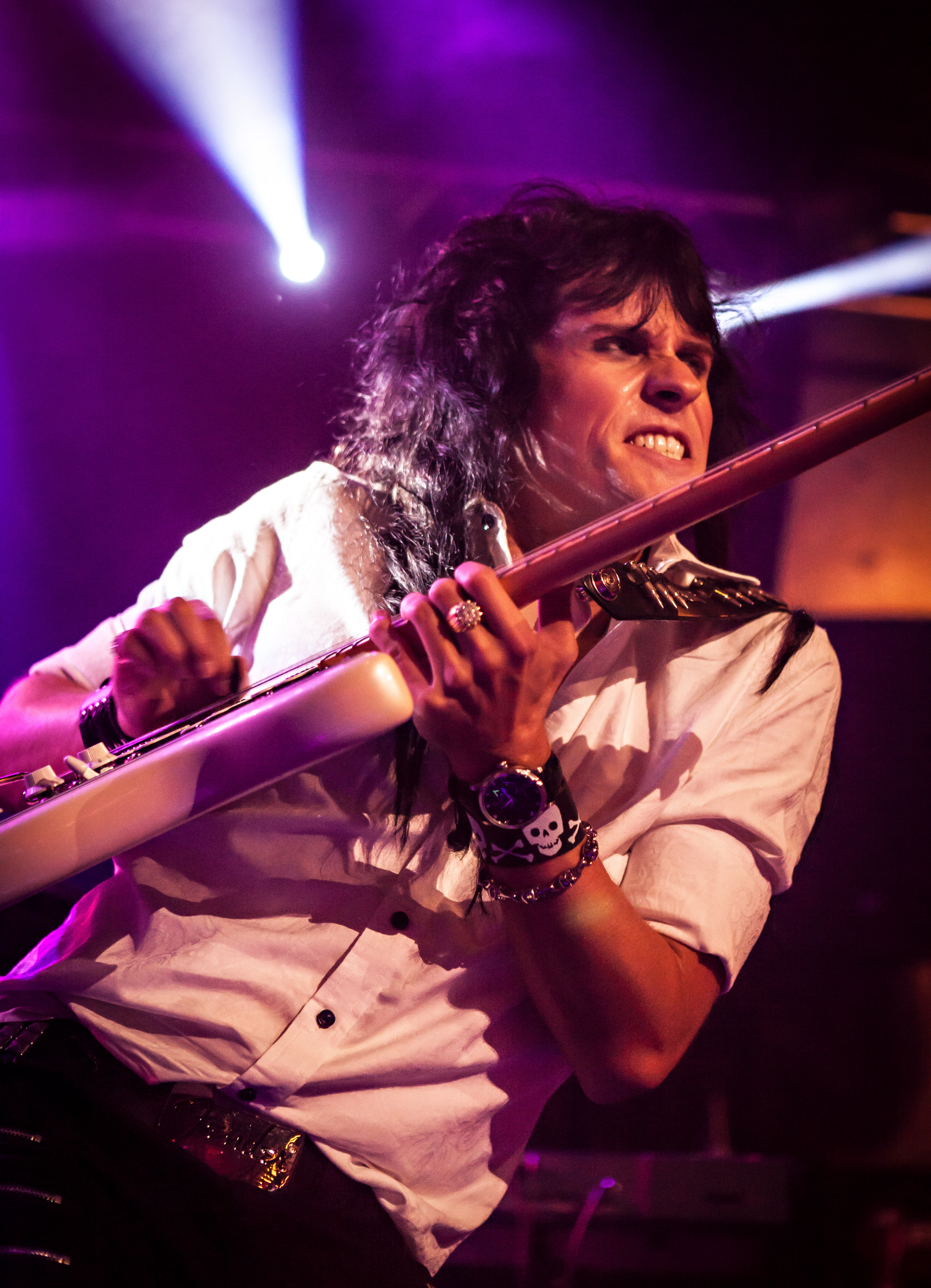
Kramer performing in 2018

On September 11, 2021, Kramer appeared at the 9/11 Celebrity Benefit Concert in New York City, commemorating the twentieth anniversary of the World Trade Center attacks, performing "The Star Spangled Banner" on guitar along with Joey Belladonna, lead singer for Anthrax on vocals, Charlie Z (DRMAGDN) on drums and NO Mansfield (Revolushn) on bass guitar. Kramer additionally played "Some Kind of Wonderful," with Jon Butcher, and performed his chart topping single "Rock Star."

In August 2022, Kramer appeared on a U.S. Toyota commercial performing "a smokin' guitar solo beside a black Toyota Tacoma [that] ... gained viral notoriety during Saturday Night Live." In addition to the Toyota commercial, Kramer shot "another commercial for a yet-to-be-announced international brand" in Arizona. In October 2022, Kramer also appeared on "the global broadcast for the 'Let Me Help the Children of the World' benefit extravaganza along with over 80 iconic artists from all over the planet. He was joined by superstars including Paul Anka, Tony Orlando, Bonfire, Ten Years After, Leland Sklar (Toto, James Taylor), Kenny Aronoff (John Mellencamp, Smashing Pumpkins), John Lodge (Moody Blues), Jon Davidson (YES), Alex Skolnick (Testament), Tony Moore (Iron Maiden), Kenny Marquez (Renegade), YNG Zuck, and a barrage of others."

=== The Rocky Kramer Band ===
Kramer maintains an accomplished group of progressive metal musicians formally known as "The Rocky Kramer Band". In addition to Kramer, the original line up consisted of Alejandro Mercado on drums and backup vocals, Michael Dwyer on bass guitar and backup vocals and Matt Grossman on keyboards and backup vocals. Each of the original members played on Kramer's Firestorm album, with the exception of Grossman, who joined the band after Firestorm was recorded, but has toured with Kramer. The original keyboard parts on Firestorm were performed by Jon Dunmore. In February of 2024, Kramer announced that he was recording his sophomore album, "Alone In The Rain", along with the Rockin' In Time movie soundtrack, at the famed East West Studios in Hollywood, with a line-up of keyboardist Allison Picioni, bassist Mike Clairmont and drummer Lamar Little.

=== Discography ===
Year	Title	Album details
2019	Rock Star Single, from Firestorm Album	Label: Allied Artists Music Group
2019	Firestorm Album (Note: The song Rock Star achieved Number 1 – TOP 150 INDEPENDENT AIRPLAY CHART October 5, 2019)	Label: Allied Artists Music Group
2021	Alcohol Single, from Firestorm Album	Label: Allied Artists Music Group

=== Videography ===
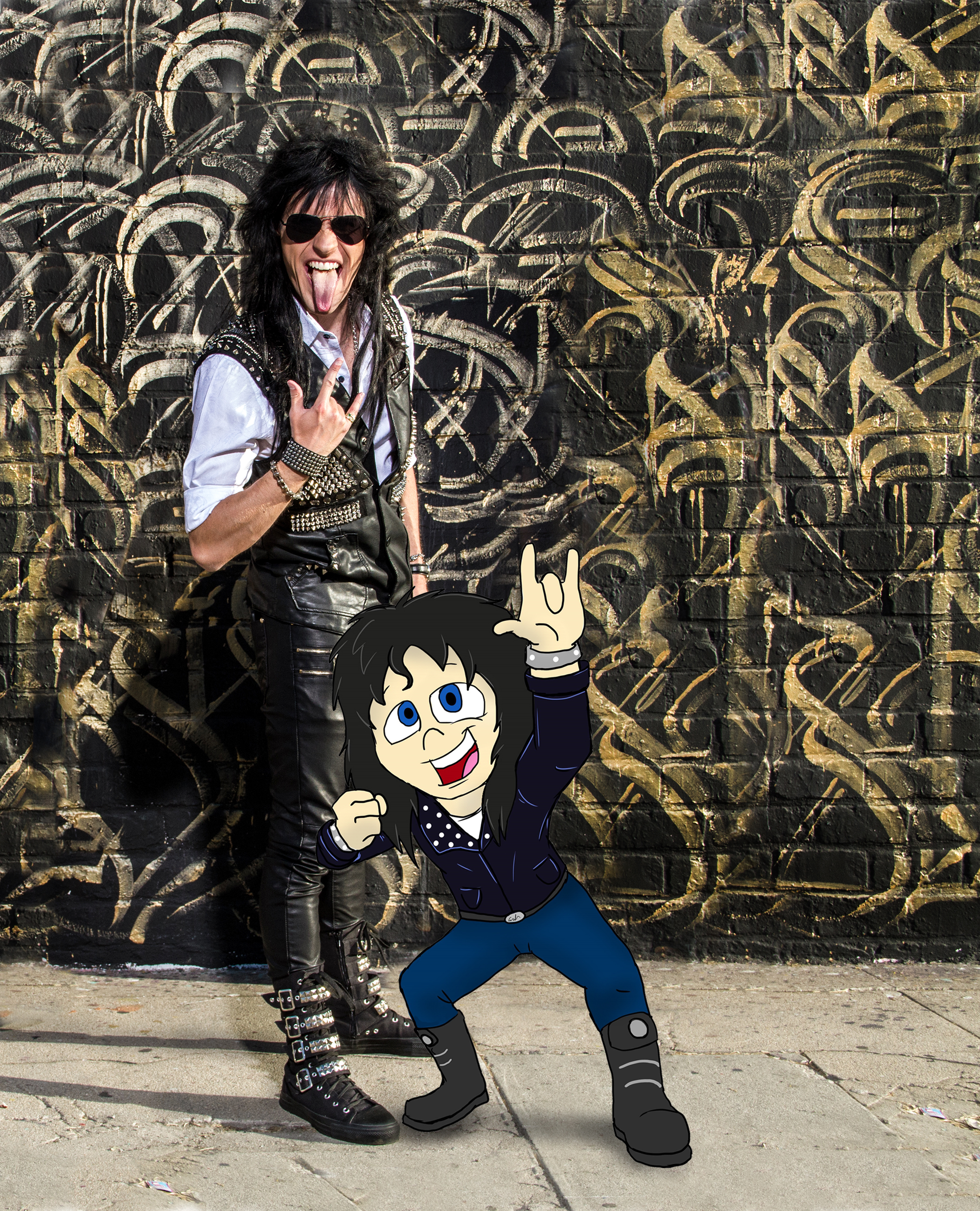
Rocky and his younger animated self, "Little Rocky" from the Rock Star Music Video

Year	Title	Video details
2019	Rock Star Music Video, from the Rocky Kramer Firestorm Album	Released through: Allied Artists Music Group
2020	Pink Floyd, "Comfortably Numb" by Rocky Kramer	Released through: Allied Artists Music Group
2020	Foo Fighters, "The Pretender" by Rocky Kramer	Released through: Allied Artists Music Group
2020	Linkin Park, "Breaking The Habit" by Rocky Kramer	Released through: Allied Artists Music Group
2020	Edwyn Collins, "A Girl Like You" by Rocky Kramer	Released through: Allied Artists Music Group
2020	CHVRCHES, "Keep You on My Side" by Rocky Kramer	Released through: Allied Artists Music Group
2020	Queen, "The Show Must Go On" by Rocky Kramer	Released through: Allied Artists Music Group
2020	Genesis, "Mama" by Rocky Kramer	Released through: Allied Artists Music Group
2020	Yngwie Malmsteen, "Baroque & Roll" by Rocky Kramer	Released through: Allied Artists Music Group
2020	KISS, "Love Gun" by Rocky Kramer	Released through: Allied Artists Music Group
2021	Led Zeppelin, "Babe, I'm Gonna Leave You" by Rocky Kramer	Released through: Allied Artists Music Group
2021	The Star-Spangled Banner by Rocky Kramer	Released through: Allied Artists Music Group
2021	Alcohol Music Video, from the Rocky Kramer Firestorm Album	Released through: Allied Artists Music Group

=== Accolades ===
Award	Category	Year	Result	Ref(s)
Rock Over America Music Awards	Best New Male Rock Musician	2012	Won	
Hollywood Music in Media Awards	Rock music	2019	Nominated	

== Immigration and naturalization ==
Kramer grew up in 1990's Norway, but felt it wasn't the best decade or location for rock music, preferring music created before he was born that became popular in the United States. He decided to attend classes in California in 2011, obtaining a student visa to do so. While in the United States as a student, Kramer hoped to be discovered. Owing to the efforts of his school's host family matriarch, Kramer met noted guitarist, Mike Pinera (Alice Cooper, Iron Butterfly & Blues Image), who introduced him to Allied Artists Music Group, who signed him to a recording contract and petitioned for an "extraordinary ability" visa. Kramer relocated to the United States permanently in 2012. Soon thereafter, Kramer exchanged his "Extraordinary Ability" visa for "Permanent Resident" status. Five years later Kramer became eligible to apply for United States citizenship. However, he didn't want to renounce his Norwegian citizenship. Fortuitously for Kramer, Norway changed its laws to permit dual citizenship a month before he became eligible to submit his U.S. citizenship application. Kramer applied for and was sworn in as a United States citizen on March 4, 2021. Because Norway now permits dual citizenship, Kramer is a citizen of both Norway and the United States, referring to himself as a "Norwegian-American." To celebrate being welcomed in as a United States citizen, Kramer recorded an instrumental version of "The Star Spangled Banner", filming portions during his oath ceremony and releasing it as a music video that premiered on the March 9, 2021, episode of "Rock & Roll Tuesdays with Rocky Kramer."

== Equipment ==
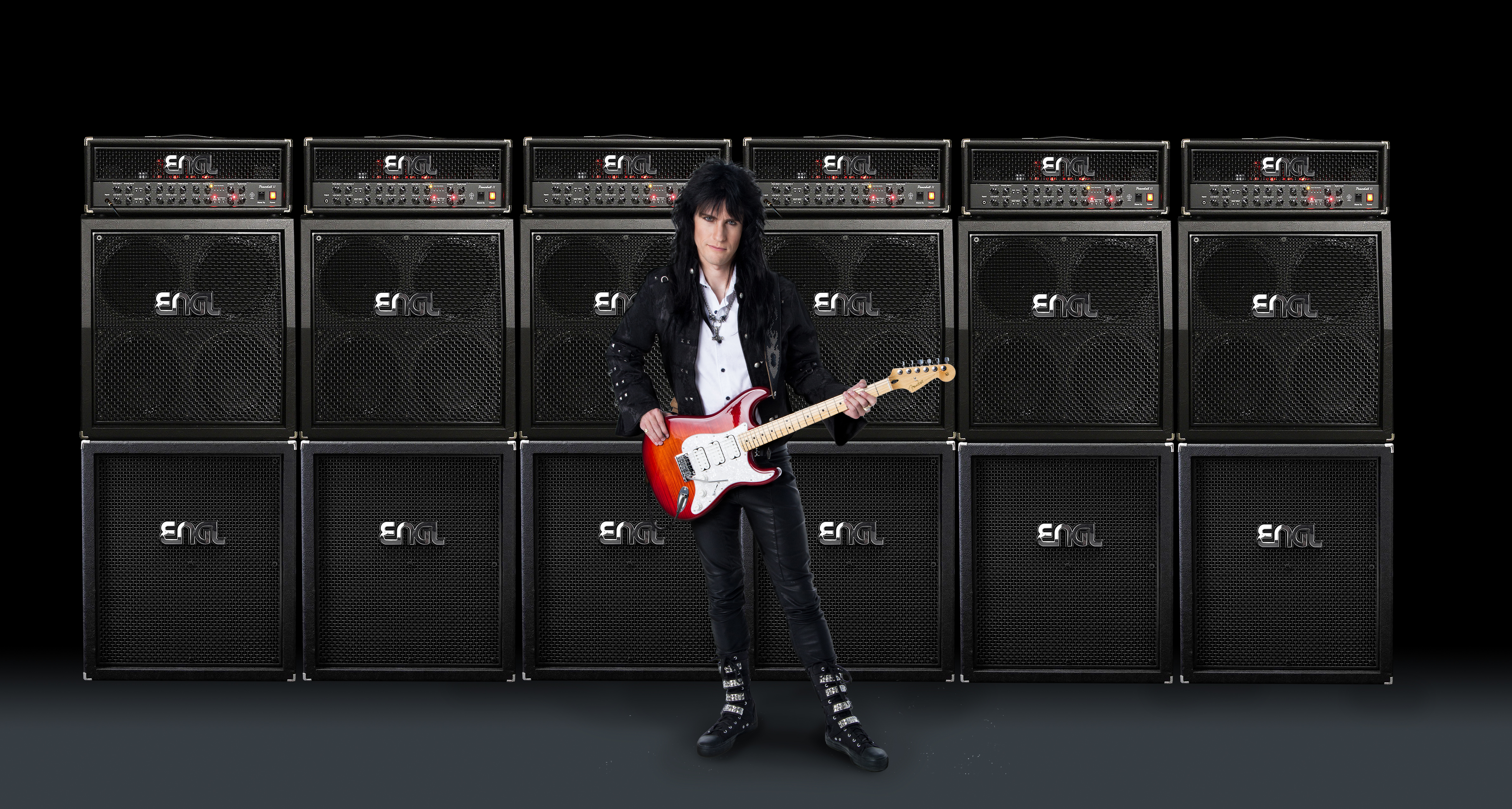
Rocky and a wall of ENGL Amps with "Ace," one of his Fender Stratocasters

Kramer bought his first Fender Stratocaster at age 14 and owns a number of them today, along with a Fender Telecaster and Jazz Bass. Kramer had an opportunity to endorse Gibson guitars, but chose Fender over Gibson because that's what he plays. In addition to Fender, Kramer also endorses ENGL Amps, Jim Dunlop Guitar Picks, ClearTone Guitar Strings, Spiral Electric FX Pedals, Fractal Audio Axe FX III Amp Modelers, and JH Audio In-Ears.
