= Vladimir Politov =

Russian singer (born 1970)

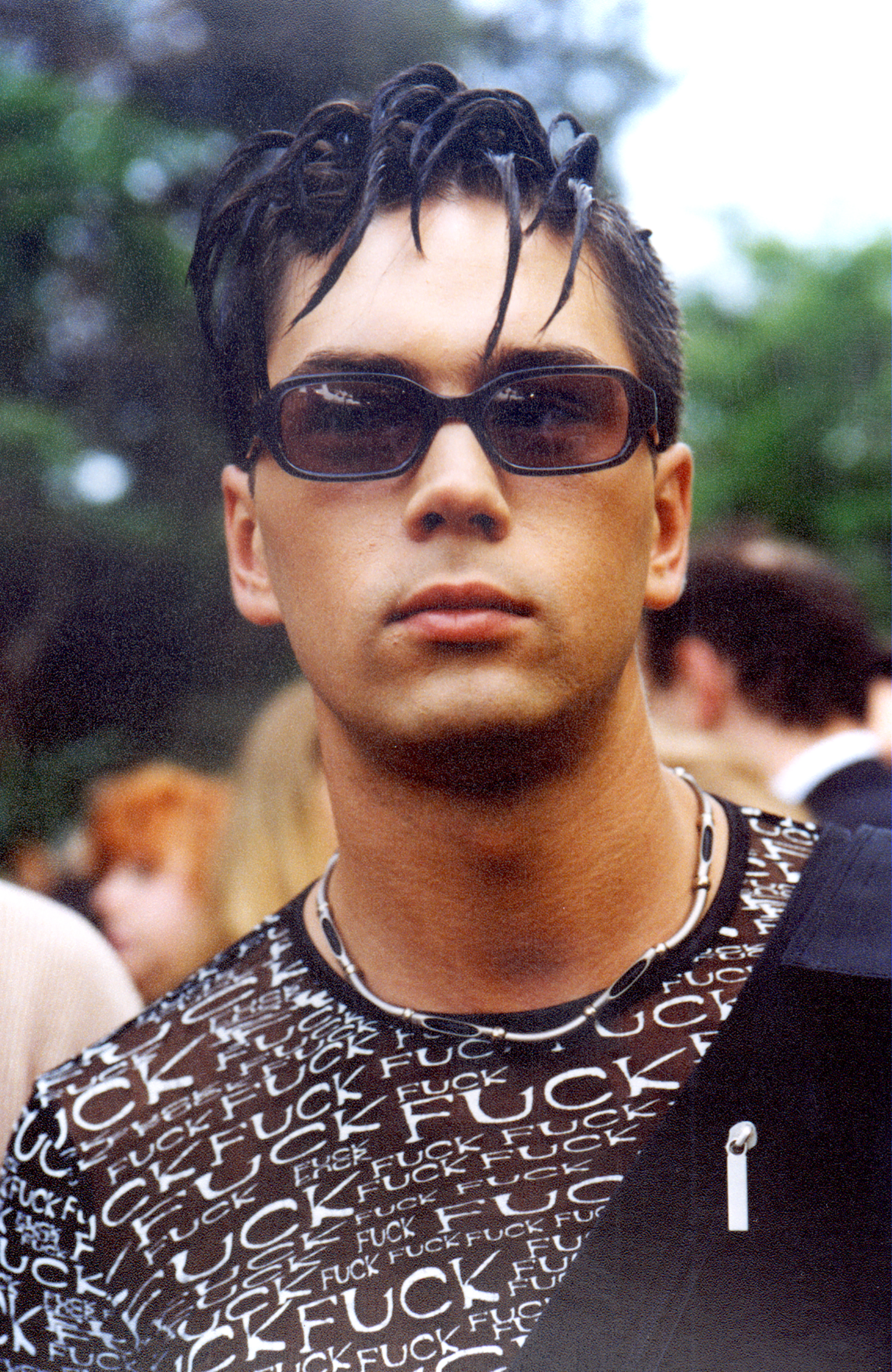

Background information
- Also known as: Vlad Politov
- Born: Vladimir Petrovich Politov; December 6, 1970 (age 55); Batagai, Sakha (Yakutia) Republic, USSR
- Genres: Pop, pop rock
- Occupations: Singer, musician, DJ, performer, actor
- Instruments: Vocals, classical guitar
- Years active: 1990–present
- Website: www.politov.com Na-Na Group Official Website

Vladimir Petrovich Politov (Russian: Владимир Петрович Политов; born December 6, 1970, in Batagai, Sakha (Yakutia) Republic, USSR) is a Russian singer who rose to popularity as member of Russian music band Na-Na.

== Career ==
- 1990 – present – performer in Russian band Na-Na
- 2004 – current – DJ PS Project

In 2000 he signed a contract with Dick Clark Productions.

== Personal life ==
Vladimir was married to Olga Politova from 1999 until their divorce in 2006, together they have daughter Aliona (born in 2000), whom Vladimir raised by himself as a single father for many years.
