= Bari Alibasov =

Kazakh music producer (born 1947)

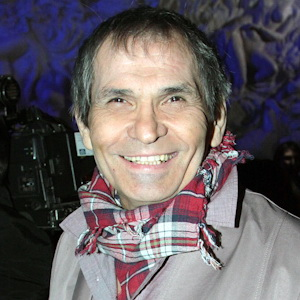
- Born: Bari Karimovich Alibasov; 6 June 1947 (age 79); Charsk, Semipalatinsk Oblast, Kazakh SSR, USSR
- Occupations: Musical producer Musical manager musician
- Years active: 1965 – present
- Known for: Producer and Manager of: Na Na; Integral
- Bari Alibasov's voice Alibasov on the Echo of Moscow program, 28 December 2006
- Website: na-nax.com

Bari Karimovich Alibasov (Russian: Бари Каримович Алибасов; Tatar: Бари Кәрим улы Әлибасов; Kazakh: Бауыржан Кәрімұлы Әлібасов; born 6 June 1947) is a Moscow-based musical producer best known for creating a successful Russian boy band Na-Na in 1989. Previously he had managed the jazz band Integral from 1965 till 1989. He was awarded Meritorious Artist of Russia (1999).
