= Vyacheslav Zherebkin =

Russian singer (born 1968)

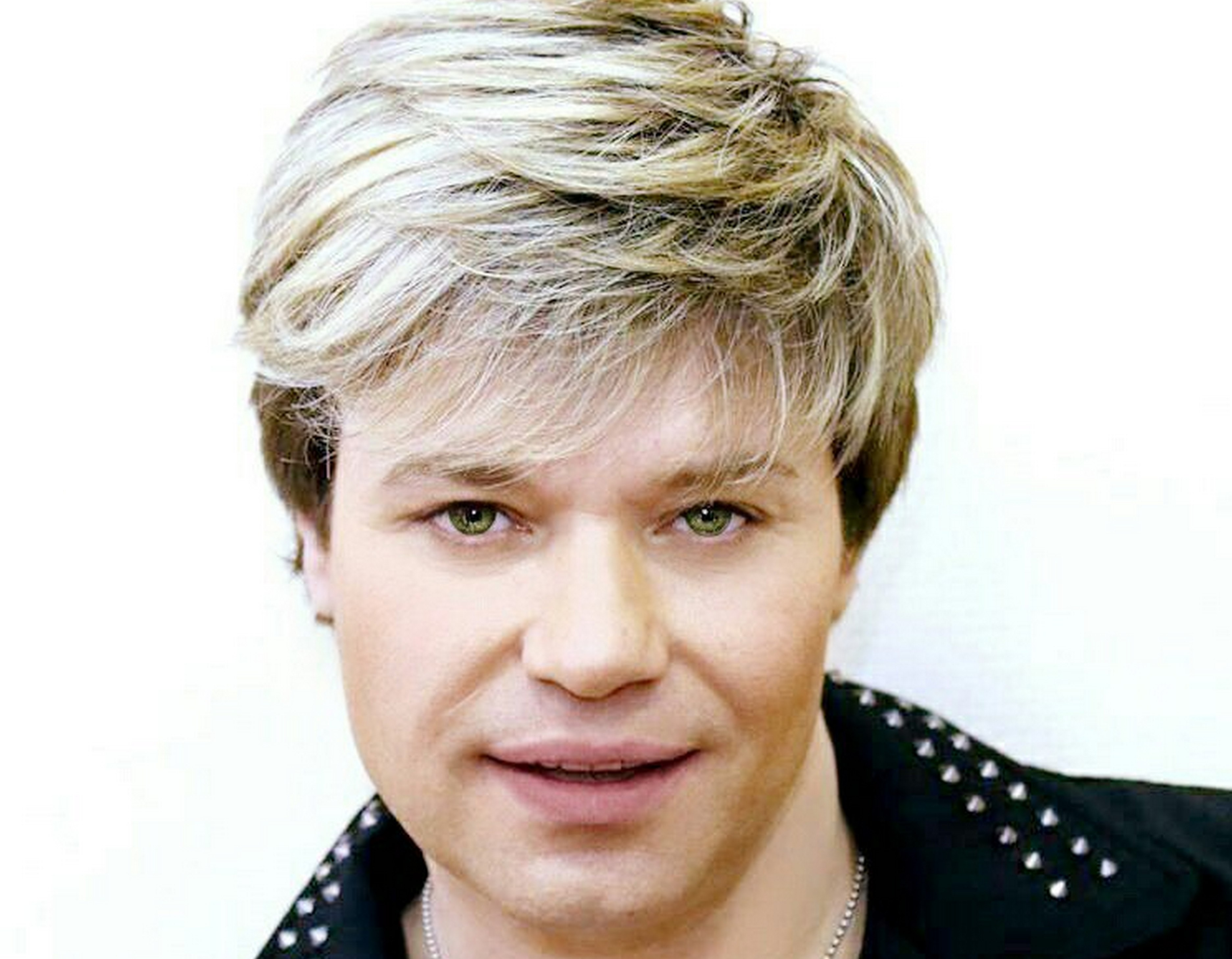

Background information
- Also known as: Drakosha; Slava Zherebkin
- Born: Vyacheslav Panteleyevich Zherebkin; August 30, 1968 (age 58); Domodedovo, Moscow oblast, USSR
- Genres: Pop, pop-rock
- Occupations: singer, musician, performer, actor
- Instruments: Vocals, bass guitar
- Years active: 1992–present
- Member of: Na Na
- Website: Na-Na group Official website

Vyacheslav Panteleyevich Zherebkin (Russian: Вячесла́в Пантеле́евич Жере́бкин; born August 30, 1968, in Domodedovo, Moscow oblast, USSR) is a Russian singer who rose to popularity as member of the Russian band Na Na. Honored Artist of Russia (2001).

== Career ==
- 1992 – present – Performer in Russian band Na Na.
- 2000 – Signed a contract with Dick Clark Productions.
