= Charsk =

Charsk Шар
- Town
- Location in Abai Region, Kazakhstan
- Coordinates: 49°35′9″N 81°2′52″E
- Country: Kazakhstan
- Region: Abai Region
- District: Zharma District

Population (2024)
  - Total: 6,412
- Time zone: UTC+5 (Astana Time)

Charsk (Russian: Чарск) or Shar (Kazakh: Шар) is a town in Zharma District in Abai Region of eastern Kazakhstan.

== Name ==
Charsk is located at the left bank of the Shar River, a left tributary of the Irtysh. The name of the town originates from the name of the river.

== Population ==
Population:

- 6,412, as of 2024
- 8,156 (2009 census results)
- 9,482 (1999 census results)

== History ==
Charsk was founded as a railway station on the Turkestan–Siberia Railway. Until 1963, it was known as the settlement of Charsky. At the time, it was a part of Ust-Kamenogorsky Uyezd of Semipalatinsk Oblast, which in 1920 was transformed into Semipalatinsk Governorate. On January 17, 1928 Semipalatinsk Governorate was abolished, and Charsky became a part of Zharma (Dzharma) District of Semipalatinsk Okrug of the Kazak Autonomous Socialist Soviet Republic. On December 17, 1930 the okrug was abolished, and the districts were directly subordinated to the republic. On February 20, 1932 East Kazakhstan Oblast was established, and Zharma District became a part of the region. On October 14, 1939 Semipalatinsk Oblast was split off East Kazakhstan Oblast, and Zharma District was moved into Semipalatinsk Oblast.

On October 16, 1939 Charsky District was established, with the administrative center located in Charsky. The district was split off Zharma District. In 1963, Charsky was granted town status and renamed Charsk. In 1964, the district was merged into Zharma District, and re-established on March 10, 1972. On May 3, 1997 Semipalatinsk Region was abolished and merged into East Kazakhstan Region. On May 23, 1997 Charsk District was abolished and merged into Zharma District.

== Economy ==
=== Industry ===
The industry of Charsk mainly serves the railway station.

=== Transportation ===
In Charsk, there is a railway station on the Turkestan–Siberia Railway which connects Novosibirsk and Almaty, on the stretch between Semey and Ayagoz. There is also a railway connecting Charsk and Oskemen. Previously, Oskemen was only connected by railways in the rest of Kazakhstan via Russia. In 2008, the bypass between Oskemen and Charsk was completed.

Charsk has access to the M38 highway, which runs between Chinese and Russian borders via Semey and Pavlodar. There is also access to Oskemen via M38.

== Climate ==
Charsk has a humid continental climate (Köppen: Dfb) with very cold winters and warm summers.

Climate data for Shar (1991–2020)
Month	Jan	Feb	Mar	Apr	May	Jun	Jul	Aug	Sep	Oct	Nov	Dec	Year
Record high °C (°F)	−0.6 (30.9)	1.7 (35.1)	11.4 (52.5)	26.1 (79.0)	32.2 (90.0)	35.5 (95.9)	37.2 (99.0)	36.6 (97.9)	32.1 (89.8)	23.8 (74.8)	12.3 (54.1)	1.7 (35.1)	37.2 (99.0)
Mean daily maximum °C (°F)	−10.5 (13.1)	−7.7 (18.1)	−0.3 (31.5)	14.2 (57.6)	22.0 (71.6)	27.6 (81.7)	28.9 (84.0)	27.4 (81.3)	20.8 (69.4)	12.3 (54.1)	0.1 (32.2)	−7.3 (18.9)	10.6 (51.1)
Daily mean °C (°F)	−15.5 (4.1)	−13.6 (7.5)	−6.0 (21.2)	6.7 (44.1)	13.9 (57.0)	19.8 (67.6)	21.4 (70.5)	19.3 (66.7)	12.4 (54.3)	4.9 (40.8)	−5.3 (22.5)	−12.0 (10.4)	3.8 (38.8)
Mean daily minimum °C (°F)	−20.6 (−5.1)	−19.2 (−2.6)	−11.2 (11.8)	−0.1 (31.8)	5.6 (42.1)	11.8 (53.2)	14.1 (57.4)	11.3 (52.3)	4.5 (40.1)	−1.2 (29.8)	−10.1 (13.8)	−16.9 (1.6)	−2.7 (27.1)
Record low °C (°F)	−35.4 (−31.7)	−32.8 (−27.0)	−25.7 (−14.3)	−9.8 (14.4)	−3.4 (25.9)	3.6 (38.5)	7.9 (46.2)	4.1 (39.4)	−4.5 (23.9)	−10.9 (12.4)	−26.0 (−14.8)	−32.2 (−26.0)	−35.4 (−31.7)
Average precipitation mm (inches)	13.6 (0.54)	15.0 (0.59)	18.2 (0.72)	20.5 (0.81)	24.4 (0.96)	29.9 (1.18)	52.7 (2.07)	26 (1.0)	16.8 (0.66)	25.0 (0.98)	28.7 (1.13)	20.9 (0.82)	291.7 (11.48)
Average precipitation days (≥ 1.0 mm)	4.4	4.5	4.6	4.9	5.4	5.9	7.4	4.4	4.0	5.7	6.8	6.1	64.1
Source: NOAA
