= Luis Cardenas =

American drummer

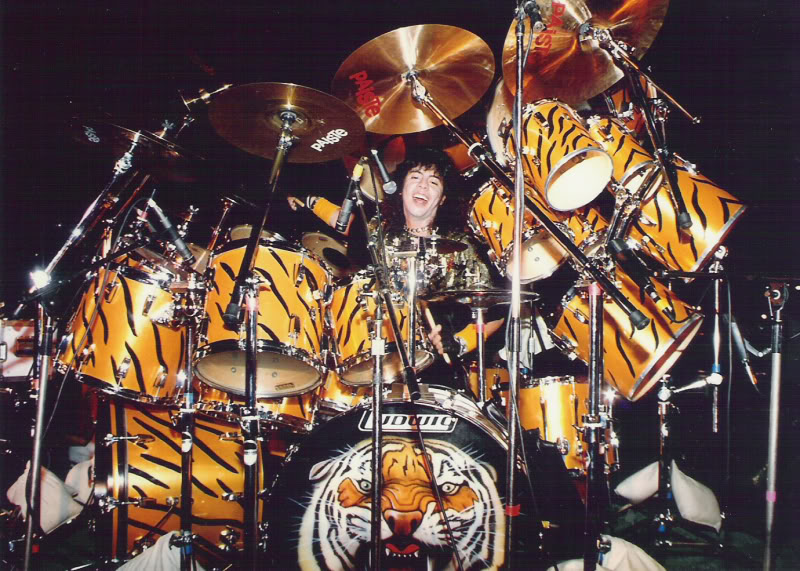
- 114 piece Guinness Book of World Records Ludwig drum set used by Luis Cardenas with Renegade

Background information
- Born: Luis Anthony Cardenas
- Genres: hard rock, latin rock, glam metal
- Occupations: Musician, songwriter
- Instruments: Drums, guitar, percussion, bass, keyboards, piano, vocals
- Years active: 1985–present
- Labels: Allied Artists Music Group, Columbia Records, Warner Bros. Records, Capitol Records
- Member of: Renegade
- Website: luiscardenas.com

Luis Cardenas is a Latin-American drummer who has been active since the early 1980s, both as a solo act and as a member of the rock band Renegade.

== Renegade ==
Renegade was formed in California in the early 1980s by Cardenas and the band's manager/producer Kim Richards and were unusual in being ethnic Hispanics playing rock music. Widely viewed as teen idols, the band headlined the Saturday nights of the Los Angeles Street Scene Festival in both 1985 and 1986, with audiences of 150,000 in attendance. They released four albums, Rock n' Roll Crazy, Renegade II – On the Run, Nuns on Wheels and Renegade Live, with their major success coming in California, Mexico and Japan. Renegade played around the world and at music festivals with bands such as 38 Special, Foreigner, Journey and Night Ranger, and in the late 1980s were asked by Kenny Rogers to appear on the Texas-New Mexico Border with Lionel Richie and Lee Greenwood to support Rogers' Hands Across America effort. In 1990, the band was featured in a 98-minute television special aired on MTV internationally, entitled Renegade MTV Special.

Renegade reformed in 2000 and was honored in August 2001 at a David Hasselhoff-hosted event at the Conga Room in Los Angeles for record sales in excess of 30 million units worldwide.

== Solo projects ==
In 1986 Cardenas held the world record for having the world's largest drumkit, which he demonstrated on the Guinness Hall of Fame Awards TV show hosted by David Frost.

The same year Cardenas released a solo album entitled Animal Instinct. The first single from the album was a cover of the Del Shannon song "Runaway" and became a hit in the US, peaking at number 83 on the Billboard Hot 100. The video for the single featured cameo appearances by Shannon and Donny Osmond and cost $500,000 to make, reputedly the most expensive video ever made for a single at the time. It won a nomination for Best Music Video, Short Form at the 29th Annual Grammy Awards. Cardenas followed "Runaway" with the self-penned "Hungry for Your Love", which featured Phyllis Diller and Cardenas's pet tiger Bundi in the video, but the single did not match the success of "Runaway". The album Animal Instinct was reissued on March 6, 2012, featuring bonus tracks and the videos for the singles.

The re-release of Animal Instinct was due to precede the release of a new double album by Cardenas entitled Generations that was to include Cardenas's two sons Nick and Zach Cardenas and was planned for release later in 2012. However, in a press release sent out by Allied Artists on October 15, 2012, it was announced that the album "will not be distributed at this time, and no new date has been established".
