= Robert Fitzpatrick (lawyer) =

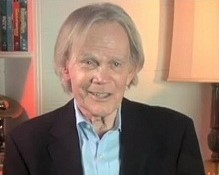
- Robert Fitzpatrick being interviewed about The Beatles in 2009
- Born: Robert Fitzpatrick; 2 July 1937; San Antonio, Texas, U.S.
- Died: 23 October 2010 (aged 73); Los Angeles, California, U.S.
- Occupation(s): Music Executive; Manager; Film producer Lawyer; Actor; At time of death, President of Allied Artists International parent of Allied Artists Film and Music Groups
- Spouses: Carole Curb (m. 1968; div. 1969) Denise Michelle Fitzpatrick (m. 1999)
- Children: 1
- Musical career
- Website: www.alliedartists.com

Robert Fitzpatrick (July 2, 1937 – October 23, 2010) was an American actor, lawyer, film producer, and music executive.

Fitzpatrick born in San Antonio, Texas, brought up in New Jersey and ran away from home and went to New York at the age of 15 where he became an actor off-Broadway. He put himself through Princeton University and enlisted in the United States Marine Corps, eventually serving as a captain in Vietnam during that conflict. Upon discharge, he went to Hollywood and worked as an actor and model, playing in several 20th Century Fox films including Dear Brigitte and Goodbye Charlie. He put himself through UCLA Law School, earning an LLB and a JD degree and became a well known entertainment attorney representing many musical acts including The Beatles, The Who, The Rolling Stones and Peggy Lee.

Later, he joined Robert Stigwood to become President of Stigwood Fitzpatrick Inc. and managed such groups as Cream and The Bee Gees. He founded, along with Stigwood, Casserole Music Corporation and served as its CEO and President. He served on the Board of Hair's Natoma Entertainment Group, produced Hermione Baddeley in the stage presentation of Why Not Tonite? and produced the Emmy Award winning "Underground" with Chuck Collins in Chicago. He managed many well known musical acts during this period including Mitch Ryder & The Detroit Wheels, Arthur Lee & Love, Peggy Lee, Taj Mahal, The Buckinghams, Shady Lady, Dick Dale & The Del-tones, Dobie Gray, Crabby Appleton and many more. He also managed Don Johnson, Jay North (Dennis the Menace) and Theodore Wilson. He has worked on the soundtracks of many motion pictures including Pulp Fiction, Remember the Titans and The 51st State.

At the time of his death, Fitzpatrick was the President of Allied Artists International, Inc., parent of Allied Artists Pictures, Allied Artists Music Group and the various Allied Artists Entertainment Ventures. Throughout his career, Fitzpatrick worked as President and CEO of Vista Ave Entertainment Group, a multi faceted film and music company, RFO Entertainment, a management and production company and the Robert Fitzpatrick Organization. Shortly before his death, Fitzpatrick was interviewed by the Archives of Music Preservation in what is believed to be his last interview, speaking about representing The Beatles.

== Death ==
Fitzpatrick died on October 23, 2010, aged 73, in Los Angeles, of lung disease.
