= Allied Artists International =

American movie studio and motion picture distributor

Allied Artists International, Inc.

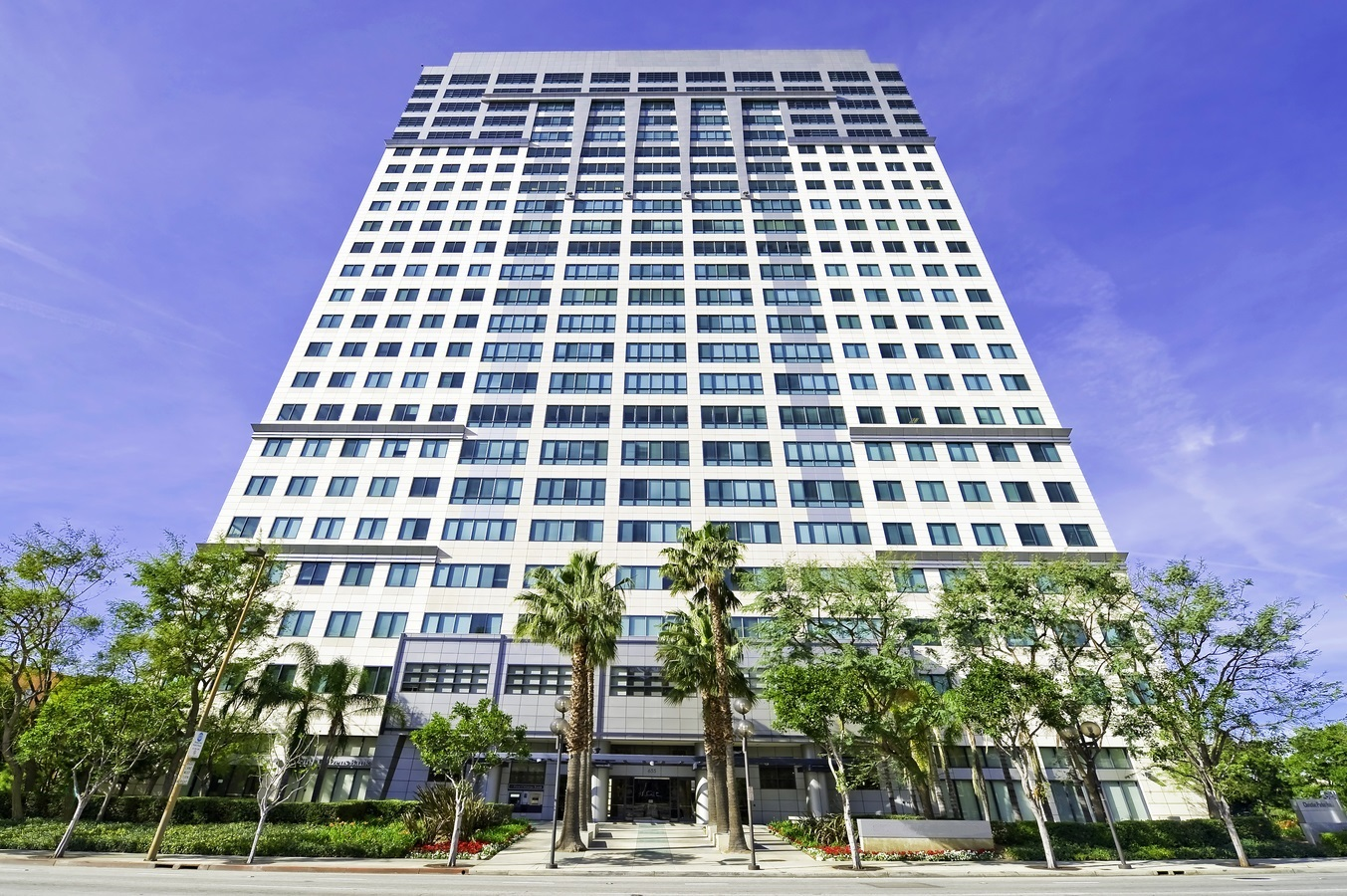
- AAI's headquarters in Glendale, California
- Type: Corporation
- Industry: Entertainment
- Predecessor: Allied Artists Pictures Corporation
- Founded: 1969; 57 years ago in Southern California, U.S., successor-in-interest to Allied Artists Pictures Corporation (1946) in New York
- Founders: Robert Abernathy; Richard B. Smith
- Headquarters: Los Angeles & New York City
- Key people: Kim Richards (CEO & Chairman); Yaniv Raphael Bar (President, Motion Pictures)
- Products: Motion pictures, Television production, Music, Music publishing, Entertainment, Television syndication, Online games, Mobile entertainment, Video on demand, Digital distribution
- Divisions: Allied Artists Music Group (Allied Artists Records, Monogram Records, Allied Artists Music Co., Brimstone Records, & Vista Records); Allied Artists Film Group (Allied Artists Pictures, Allied Artists Films, & Monogram Pictures); Allied Artists Broadcasting; Allied Artists Music & Video Distribution
- Website: alliedartists.com

Allied Artists International, Inc. (AAI) is an American multinational mass media and entertainment corporation headquartered in Glendale, California, United States, producing and distributing motion pictures, recorded music, broadcast television, online streaming, video games, and other media products. The company is the successor to Allied Artists Pictures Corporation (formerly known as Monogram Pictures Corporation). In the year 2000, AAI divided its media products into three distinct wholly owned divisions, Allied Artists Film Group (AAFG), Allied Artists Music Group (AAMG) and Allied Artists Music & Video Distribution (AAMVD). Then, around 2020, AAI reorganized itself into four divisions: Allied Artists Music Group, Allied Artists Film Group, Allied Artists Broadcasting, & Allied Artists Music & Video Distribution. Allied Artists Pictures (the flagship AAFG studio) is known for having produced and released such historic motion pictures as Cabaret, starring Joel Grey and Liza Minnelli; Papillon, starring Dustin Hoffman and Steve McQueen; and The Betsy, starring Laurence Olivier, Tommy Lee Jones, Robert Duvall, and Katharine Ross.

== History ==
=== Monogram Pictures ===
Producer Walter Mirisch began at Monogram Pictures after World War II as assistant to studio head Samuel "Steve" Broidy. He convinced Broidy that the days of low-budget films were ending, and in 1946, Monogram created a new unit, Allied Artists Productions, to make costlier films. At a time when the average Hollywood picture cost about $800,000 (and the average Monogram picture cost about $90,000), Allied Artists' first release, It Happened on Fifth Avenue (1947), cost more than $1,200,000. Subsequent Allied Artists releases were more economical but did have enhanced production value, with many being filmed in color. In July 1948 Monogram reported a loss of $978,000. The following year the loss was $850,000, although Broidy thought the company would go into profit the following year. The studio's new policy permitted what Mirisch called "B-plus" pictures, which were released along with Monogram's established line of B fare. In September 1952, Monogram announced that henceforth it would only produce films bearing the Allied Artists name. The studio ceased making movies under the Monogram brand name in 1953 (although it was reactivated by AAI by the millennium). The parent company became Allied Artists, with Monogram Pictures becoming an operating division.

=== Allied Artists Pictures ===
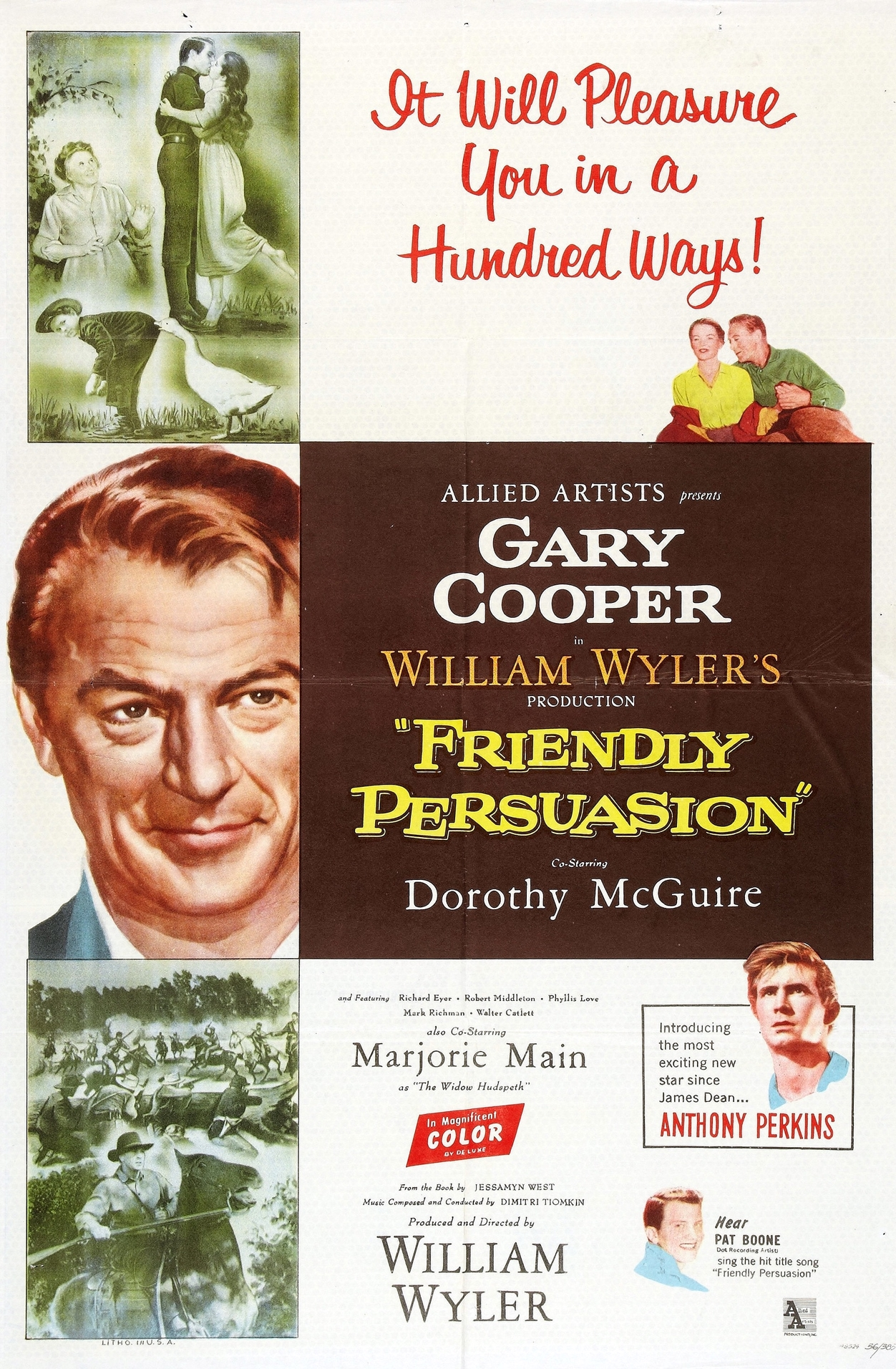
1956 Friendly Persuasion poster

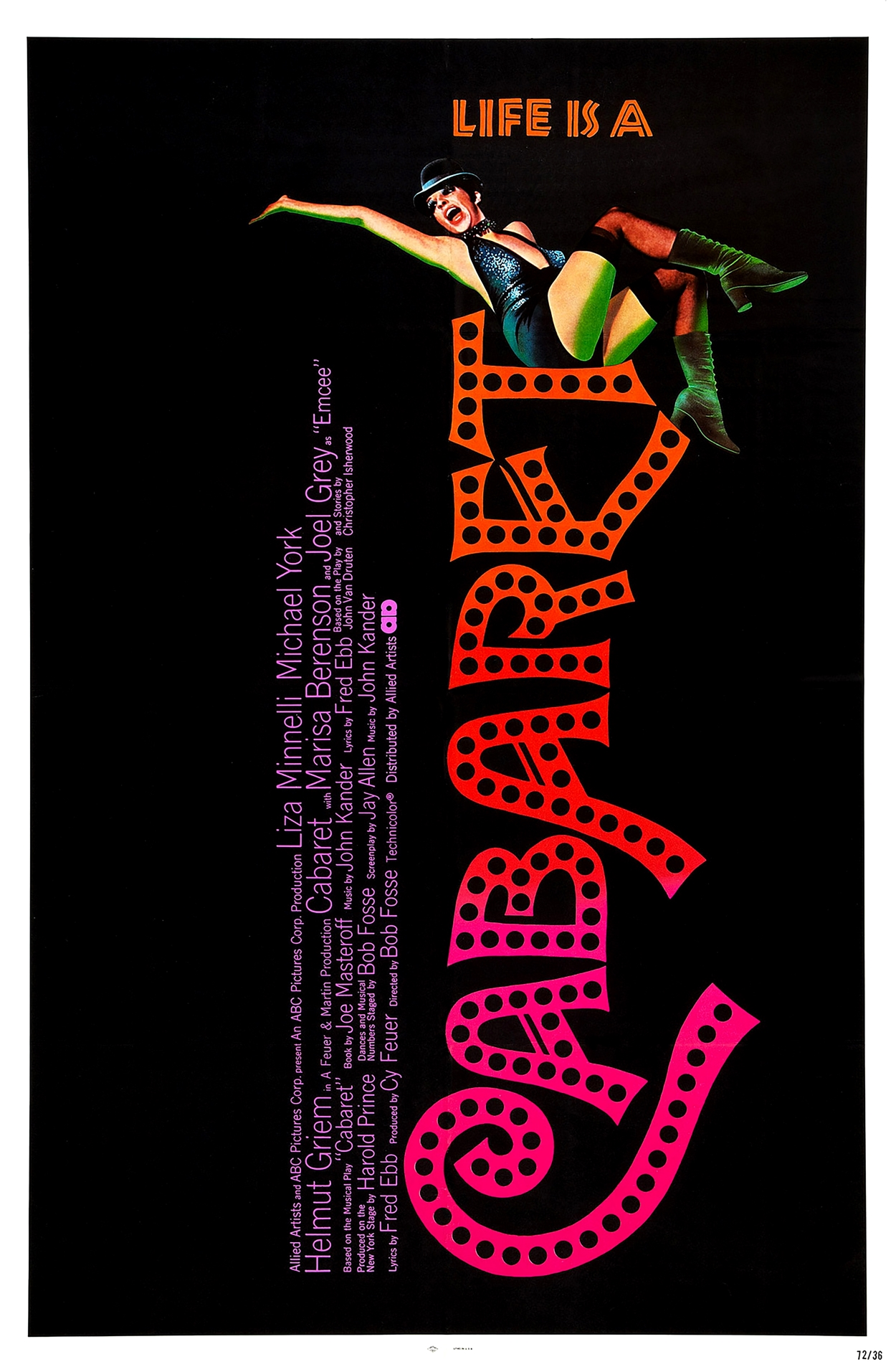
1972 Cabaret poster

Allied Artists did retain a few vestiges of its Monogram identity, continuing its popular Stanley Clements action series (through 1953), its B-Westerns (through 1954), its Bomba, the Jungle Boy adventures (through 1955), and especially its breadwinning comedy series with The Bowery Boys (through 1957 with Clements replacing Leo Gorcey). For the most part, however, Allied Artists was heading in new, ambitious directions under Mirisch. Between 1951 and 1952, Broidy announced Walter Mirisch would be head of productions and would make 45 films. For a time in the mid-1950s the Mirisch family had great influence at Allied Artists, with Walter as executive producer, his brother Marvin as head of sales, and brother Harold as corporate treasurer. They pushed the studio into big-budget filmmaking, signing contracts with William Wyler, John Huston, Billy Wilder and Gary Cooper. But when their first big-name productions, Wyler's Friendly Persuasion and Wilder's Love in the Afternoon, were box-office flops in 1956–57, studio-head Broidy retreated into the kind of pictures Monogram had always favored: low-budget action and thrillers. Mirisch Productions then had success releasing their films through United Artists. In March 1965 Allied reported a loss of $1,512,000. The previous year they recorded a loss of $161,000. A shareholder revolt saw Broidy replaced as chairman by Claude Giroux in February 1965. Broidy resigned from the company in August of 1965 to become a producer. Allied Artists paused productions in 1966 and became a distributor of foreign films, but restarted productions with the 1972 release of Cabaret and followed it the next year with Papillon. Both were critical and commercial successes, but high production and financing costs meant they were not big money makers for Allied. In 1975 Allied distributed the French import film version of Story of O but spent much of its earnings defending itself from obscenity charges. French New Wave pioneer Jean-Luc Godard dedicated his 1960 film Breathless to Monogram, citing the studio's films as a major influence.

Allied Artists Pictures became insolvent in 1979 as a result of runaway inflation and high production costs, forcing it to seek Chapter 11 bankruptcy protection. Allied Artists Records, which was an unaffected wholly owned subsidiary of Allied Artists Pictures, acquired many of the bankrupt entity's trademark-related intellectual property assets and sought to expand its trademark and service mark rights to include all forms of entertainment, including those properties previously held by Allied Artists Pictures. A select grouping of the post August 17, 1946 Monogram/Allied Artists library was bought by television producer Lorimar Productions. Today, a majority of the Lorimar library, including those acquired from Allied Artists Pictures, belongs to Warner Bros. Entertainment.

=== Allied Artists Records ===
Prior to 1971, soundtracks were informally released under the "Allied Artists Records" or "Allied Artists Music" names. Allied Artists Records was officially formed by Allied Artists Pictures in 1971 to become the motion picture soundtrack releasing vehicle for its distributed motion pictures. By 1988, Allied Artists Records laid historical claim to recording artists such as Elvis Presley, Lionel Richie, Lawrence Welk, Bob Seger, and Ted Nugent. Allied Artists Records' historical roster and catalog includes Exodus, Coolio, Luis Cardenas, David Hasselhoff and Renegade. In 2000, it was announced that Allied Artists Records would issue a Spanish-language recording by David Hasselhoff. As the anchor AAMG label, Allied Artists Records, takes its name and history from the original motion picture soundtrack label by the same name, established by Allied Artists Pictures in 1971. Today, Allied Artists Records remains as a mainstream anchor imprint, together with its wholly autonomous target market imprints, Allied Artists Music Co., Monogram Records, Brimstone Records and Vista Records. Shortly thereafter, Allied Artists Records formally consolidated each of its imprint labels into "Allied Artists Music Group" in a cost-cutting measure designed to maximize distribution strength. All music and home video offerings are distributed by way of the AAMVD global distribution network.

=== Allied Artists Music & Video Distribution ===
Allied Artists Pictures was among the first motion picture studios to self-distribute films for both itself and small independent film makers. In 1971, with the formation of Allied Artists Records, the company utilized Warner Bros. Records for domestic distribution of motion picture soundtracks. By the millennium, Allied Artists Records had developed its own robust global distribution network. As the distribution of motion pictures through major studios became cost prohibitive, Allied Artists Pictures began rediscovering its independent distribution roots. Simultaneous to restructuring the company's music holdings under Allied Artists Music Group, the motion picture holdings were restructured under Allied Artists Film Group. Both the music and film groups had their own forms of distribution, much of which overlapped. AAI, parent to both the film and music groups elected to merge both distribution arms into "Allied Artists Music & Video Distribution" (AAMVD).
