= Ince (surname) =

Ince is an English toponymic surname, from Ince in Cheshire or one of two places historically in Lancashire (now known as Ince Blundell and Ince-in-Makerfield). Meanwhile, İnce is a Turkish surname (Turkish pronunciation: [ˈindʒe]). The name may refer to:

- Ada Ince (1913–1975), American film actress
- Basil Ince (born 1933), Trinidadian sprinter
- Cem Ince (born 1993), German politician
- Clayton Ince (born 1972), Trinidadian football player
- Edward Lindsay Ince (1891–1941), English mathematician
- Sir Godfrey Ince (1891–1960), British civil servant
- Harry Ince (1893–1978), Barbadian cricketer
- Henry Ince (1736–1808), British Army officer
- Henry Bret Ince (1830–1889), British businessman, writer and politician
- İzzet İnce (born 1981), Turkish weightlifter
- James Ince (born 1970), American NASCAR crew chief
- John Ince, people of the same name:
  - John F. Ince, American author and business journalist
  - John Ince (Australian politician) (c. 1831–1897), member of the Victorian Legislative Assembly
  - John E. Ince, Sr. (1840/41–1909), English-born American actor. Father of John E. Ince, Jr.
  - John E. Ince, Jr. (1878–1947), American actor and director. Son of John E. Ince, Sr.
  - John Ince (author) (born 1952), Canadian author, lawyer, entrepreneur and activist
  - John Ince (footballer) (1908–1968), English footballer
  - John Ince (missionary) (1795–1825), British Protestant missionary
- Joseph Murray Ince (1806–1859), Welsh painter
- Kaan İnce (1970–1992), Turkish writer and poet
- Kamran Ince (born 1960), Turkish-American composer
- Muharrem İnce (born 1964), Turkish politician
- Ola Ince (born 1988 or 1989), British theatre director
- Paul Ince (born 1967), English football player
- Robin Ince (born 1969), English comedian
- Ralph Ince (1887–1937), American film actor and director
- Rohan Ince (born 1992), English football player
- Sabit İnce (born 1934), Turkish poet
- Steve Ince (born 1958), award-winning British video games designer
- Thomas Ince, people of the same name:
  - Tom Ince (born 1992), English football player, son of Paul Ince
  - Thomas H. Ince (1880–1924), American silent film actor and director
- Tony Ince (born 1958), Canadian politician
- William Ince, people of the same name:
  - William Ince (cabinet maker) (1737–1804), British cabinetmaker
  - William Ince (theologian) (1825–1910), British theologian
  - William Ince (MP) (died 1679), MP for Chester, 1660–1661

== See also ==
- Ince (disambiguation)
