= John Ince =

John Ince may refer to:

- John Ince (Australian politician) (c.1831–1897), member of the Victorian Legislative Assembly 1877 to 1880
- John F. Ince, author and business journalist
- John Ince (author), Canadian author, lawyer, entrepreneur and from 2005 to 2012 activist in the sex-positive movement
- John E. Ince, Sr. (1840/41–1909), English-born American actor. Father of John E. Ince, Jr.
- John E. Ince, Jr. (1878–1947), American actor and director. Son of John E. Ince, Sr.
- John Ince (missionary), early British Protestant missionary
- John Ince (footballer) (1908–19??), English football goalkeeper active in the 1930s
