= Kaan (name) =

Kaan is a masculine given name and surname of Turkish origin, meaning "ruler", "King of Kings" (alternatively spelled as Kağan, Khagan or Hakan, meaning "Khan of Khans"). Notable people with the name include:

== Given names ==
- Kaan Akalın (born 1997), Turkish singer, songwriter, and DJ
- Kaan Akça (born 1994), German footballer
- Kaan Ayar (born 1995), Turkish swimmer
- Kaan Ayhan (born 1994), Turkish footballer
- Kaan Aykutsun (born 2002), Turkish boxer
- Kaan Caliskaner (born 1999), German footballer
- Kaan Dalay (born 1981), Turkish wheelchair basketball player
- Kaan Esener (born 1965), Turkish diplomat
- Kaan Güneşberk, Canadian musician, songwriter, and composer
- Kaan Gürbüz (born 2001), Turkish volleyball player
- Kaan İnce (1970-1992), Turkish poet
- Kaan İşbilen (born 1983), Turkish-Canadian basketball player
- Kaan Kahriman (born 2004), Turkish weightlifter
- Kaan Kairinen (born 1998), Finnish footballer
- Kaan Kalyon, Turkish-American screenwriter and story development artist
- Kaan Kanak (born 1990), Turkish footballer
- Kaan Korad, Turkish classical guitarist
- Kaan Kurt (born 2001), German footballer
- Kaan Lativan (born 1991), Indonesian actor
- Kaan Müjdeci (born 1980), Turkish screenwriter and film director
- Kaan Kigen Özbilen (born 1986), Kenyan long-distance runner
- Kaan Özdemir (born 1998), Turkish footballer
- Kaan Tangöze (born 1973), Turkish rock singer, writer, and guitarist
- Kaan Taşaner (born 1979), Turkish actor
- Kaan Tayla (born 1986), Turkish swimmer
- Kaan Üner (born 1988), Turkish basketball player
- Kaan Urgancıoğlu (born 1981), Turkish actor
- Kaan Yıldırım (born 1986), Turkish actor and producer

== Surname ==
- Fred Kaan (1929–2009), Anglo-Dutch clergyman and hymnwriter
- Heinrich Kaan (1816–1893), Russian physician
- Mayo Kaan (1914–2002), American bodybuilder

== Science and technology ==
- TAI TF Kaan, a twin-engine, fifth generation air superiority fighter built by the Turkish Aerospace Industries for the Turkish Air Force

== Fictional characters ==
- Marty Kaan, the lead character in the Showtime comedy TV series House of Lies portrayed by Don Cheadle
- Kaz Kaan, protagonist in the animated series Neo Yokio
- Kaan, young warrior, central character in video game Kaan: Barbarian's Blade
- Lord Kaan in the Star Wars Expanded Universe

== See also ==
- Caan (name)
- Kahn (name)
- Khan (name)
- Kaan (disambiguation) (other meanings)
