= Caan (name) =

Origin
- Region of origin: Scotland

Caan is a surname. Notable figures with the name include:

== People ==
- James Caan (1940–2022), American actor
- James Caan (businessman) (born 1960), British entrepreneur
- Scott Caan (born 1976), American actor
- Caan (Dutch family), Dutch patrician family

== Fictional characters ==
- Dalek Caan was at one point the sole surviving member of the fictional Dalek race in the television series Doctor Who.

== See also ==
- Kaan, given name and surname
- Kahn, surname
- Khan (surname)
