= List of lead guitarists =

The following is a list of significant lead guitarists, arranged in alphabetical order by last name. For rhythm guitarists see list of rhythm guitarists.

== A ==
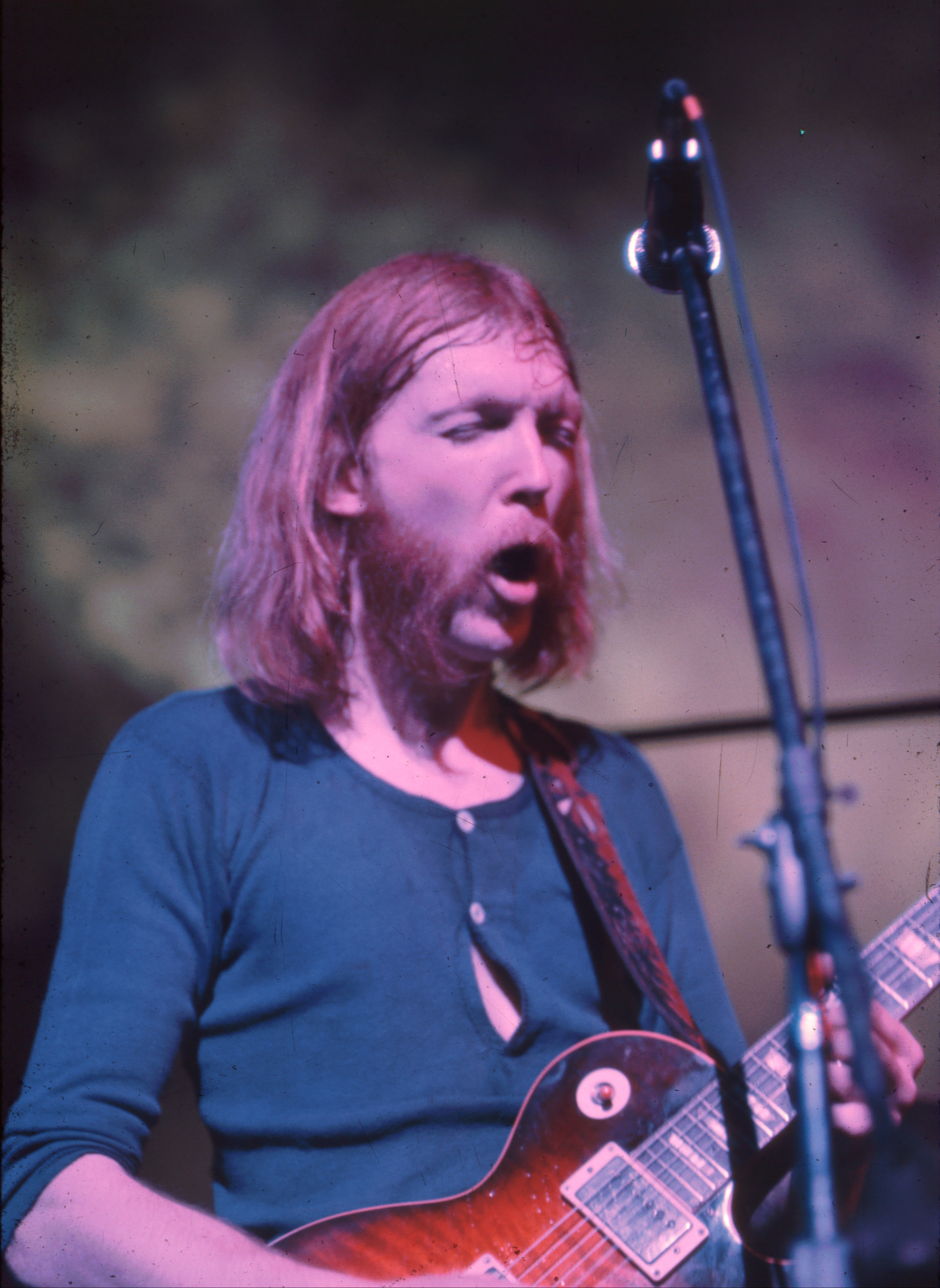
Duane Allman,1971

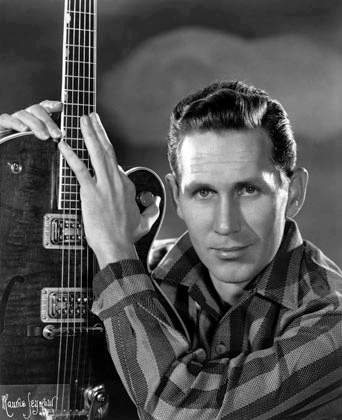
Chet Atkins

- Tosin Abasi (Animals As Leaders)
- "Dimebag" Darrell Abbott (Pantera, Damageplan, Rebel Meets Rebel)
- John Abercrombie
- Ryan Adams (The Cardinals)
- Marcus Adoro (Eraserheads)
- Mikael Åkerfeldt (Opeth)
- Fredrik Åkesson (Arch Enemy, Opeth)
- Jan Akkerman (Focus)
- Doug Aldrich (Whitesnake, Dio)
- Johnny Alegre
- Art Alexakis (Everclear)
- Paul Allender (Cradle of Filth)
- Duane Allman (The Allman Brothers Band)
- Lee Altus (Exodus, Heathen)
- Dave Amato (REO Speedwagon)
- Christopher Amott (Arch Enemy, Armageddon, Dark Tranquillity)
- Michael Amott (Arch Enemy, Carcass)
- Trey Anastasio (Phish)
- Al Anderson (Bob Marley and the Wailers)
- Emma Anderson (Lush)
- Rusty Anderson (Paul McCartney)
- Apostolis Anthimos (SBB)
- Daniel Antonsson (Dimension Zero, Soilwork)
- Redouane Aouameur
- Billie Joe Armstrong (Green Day, Pinhead Gunpowder)
- Tim Armstrong (Operation Ivy, Transplants, Rancid)
- Rob Arnold (Chimaira)
- DJ Ashba (Sixx:A.M., Guns N' Roses)
- Ron Asheton (The Stooges)
- Chet Atkins
- Berton Averre (The Knack)

== B ==
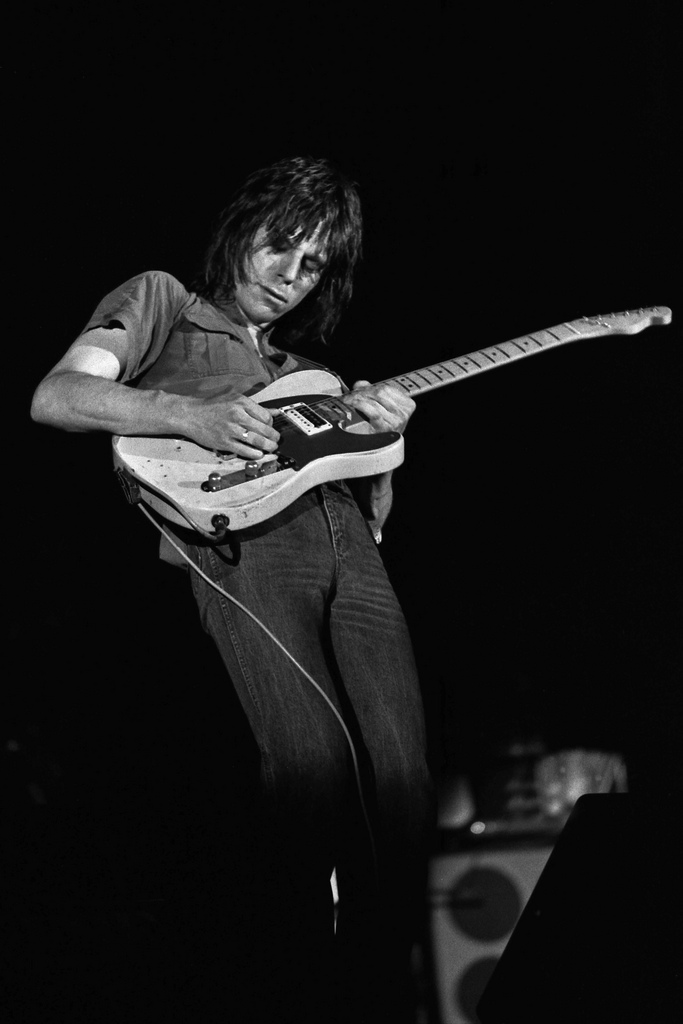
Jeff Beck, 1979

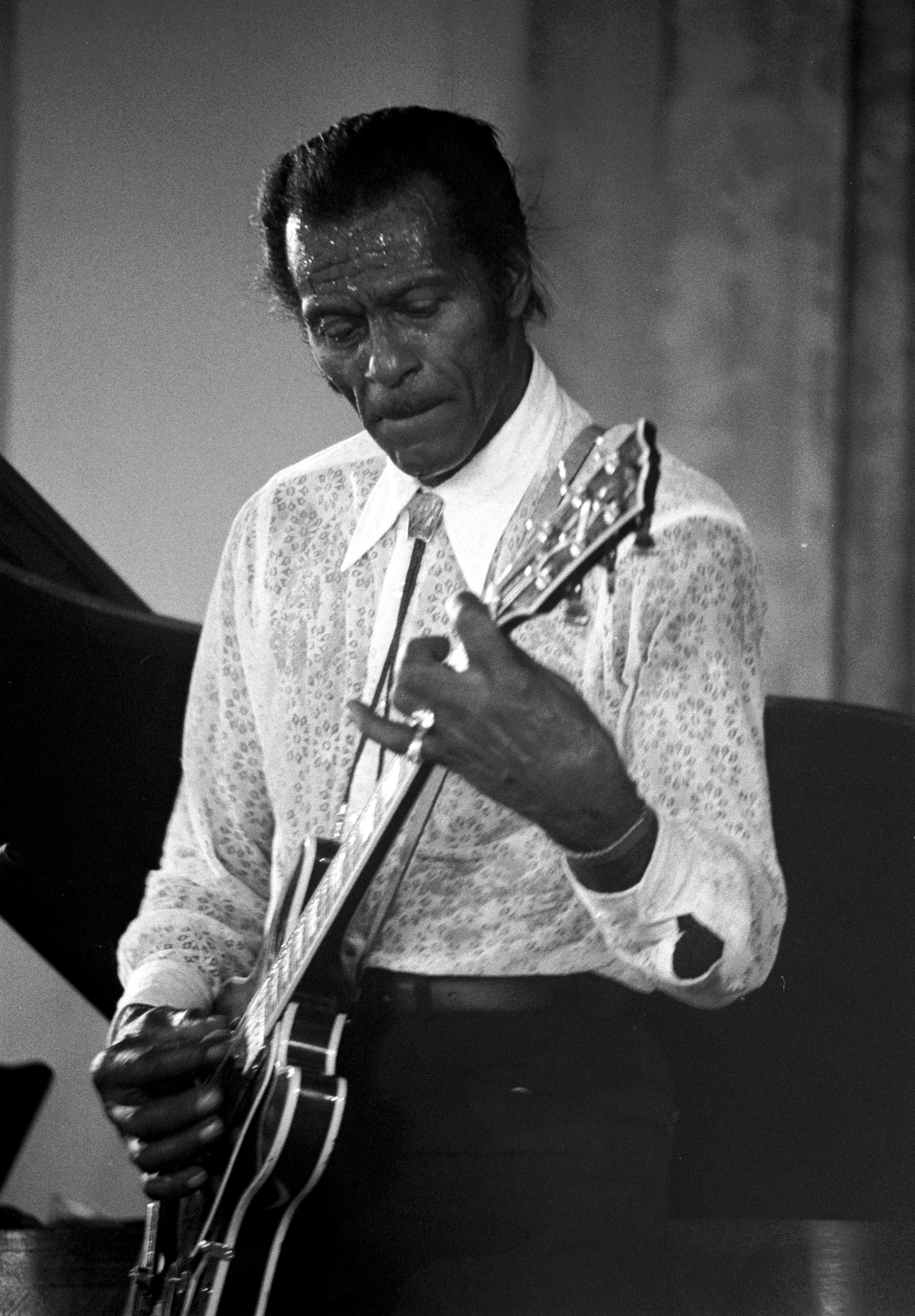
Chuck Berry, 1987

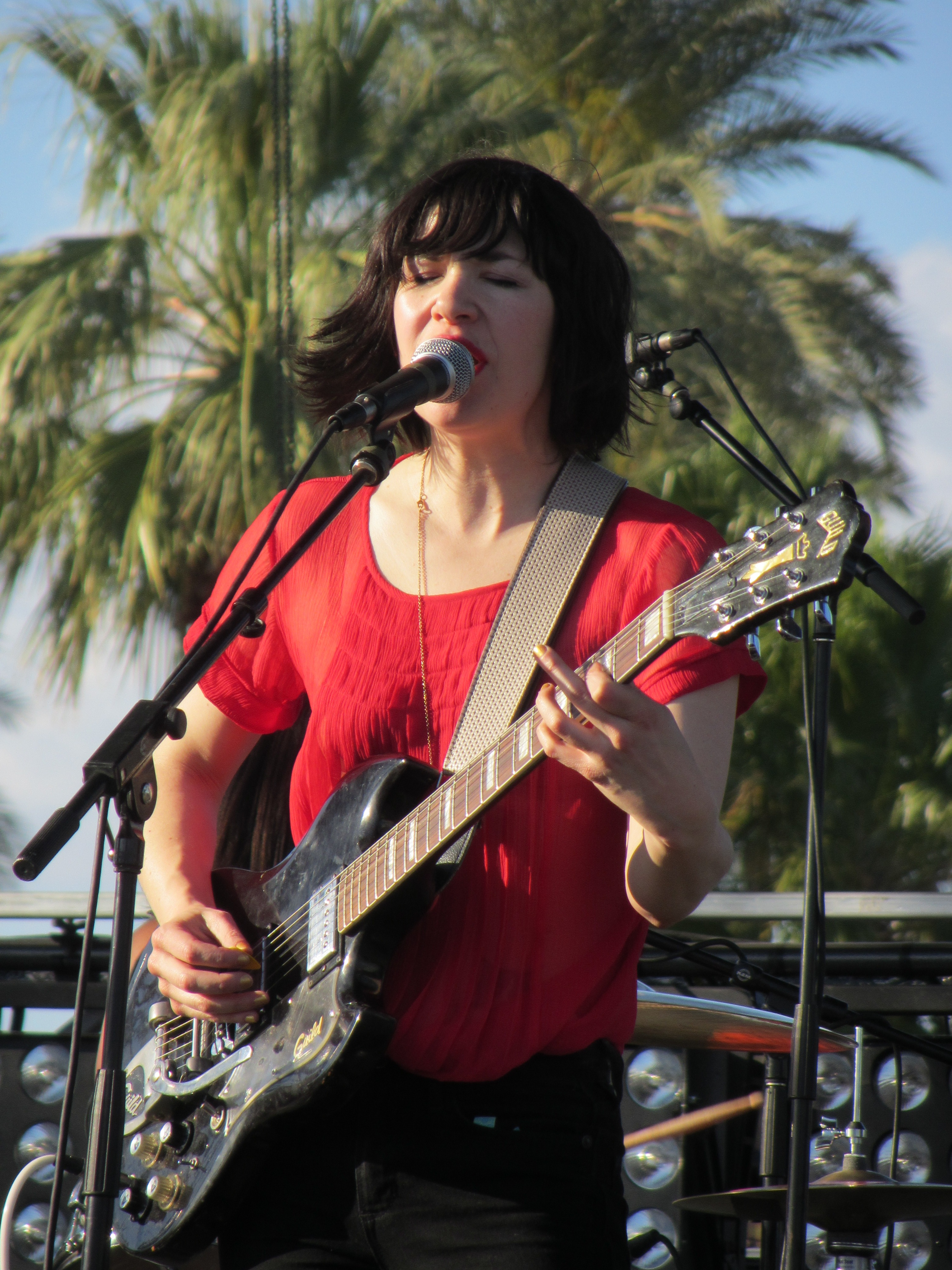
Carrie Brownstein at Coachella, 2012

- Ayub Bachchu (Love Runs Blind)
- Randy Bachman (The Guess Who, Bachman–Turner Overdrive)
- Dave Bainbridge (Iona)
- Dave Baksh (Sum 41, Brown Brigade)
- Russ Ballard (Argent)
- Terry Balsamo (Evanescence)
- Perry Bamonte (The Cure)
- Peter Banks (Yes, Flash)
- Carl Barat (The Libertines, Dirty Pretty Things)
- Marcelo Barbosa (Angra)
- Martin Barre (Jethro Tull)
- Syd Barrett (Pink Floyd)
- Steve Bartek (Oingo Boingo)
- Tyler Bates (Marilyn Manson)
- Michael Angelo Batio
- Reb Beach (Winger, Dokken, Whitesnake)
- Norman Beaker
- Corey Beaulieu (Trivium)
- Jeff Beck (The Yardbirds, Jeff Beck Group, Beck, Bogert & Appice)
- Jason Becker (David Lee Roth, Cacophony)
- Franny Beecher (Bill Haley & His Comets)
- Adrian Belew
- Andy Bell (Ride, Hurricane #1, Oasis, Beady Eye)
- Carl Bell (Fuel)
- Eric Bell (Thin Lizzy)
- Matt Bellamy (Muse)
- George Benson
- Chuck Berry
- Nuno Bettencourt (Extreme, Rihanna)
- Dickey Betts (The Allman Brothers Band)
- Jason Bieler (Saigon Kick)
- Simon Binks (Australian Crawl)
- Jón Þór Birgisson (Sigur Rós)
- Anders Björler (At the Gates, The Haunted)
- Ira Black (Vio-lence)
- Frank Blackfire (Kreator, Sodom)
- Ritchie Blackmore (Deep Purple, Rainbow, Blackmore's Night)
- Doug Blair (W.A.S.P.)
- Nate Blasdell (I Set My Friends on Fire)
- Mike Bloomfield
- Marc Bolan (T. Rex)
- Tommy Bolin (Zephyr, The James Gang, Deep Purple)
- Joe Bonamassa
- Marc Bonilla (Keith Emerson)
- D. Boon (Minutemen)
- Wes Borland (Limp Bizkit, Black Light Burns)
- Johnny Borrell (Razorlight)
- Carlton Bost (Orgy)
- Mick Box (Uriah Heep)
- James Dean Bradfield (Manic Street Preachers)
- Vito Bratta (White Lion)
- Creed Bratton (The Grass Roots)
- Chris Broderick (Megadeth, Nevermore, Jag Panzer)
- Devin Bronson
- Joel Bogen (Toyah)
- Carrie Brownstein (Sleater-Kinney)
- Ben Bruce (Asking Alexandria)
- Roy Buchanan
- Peter Buck (R.E.M.)
- Rob Buck (10,000 Maniacs)
- Buckethead (Praxis, Guns N' Roses, C2B3)
- Lindsey Buckingham (Fleetwood Mac)
- Jonny Buckland (Coldplay)
- Bumblefoot (Guns N' Roses)
- Vinny Burns (Ten)
- James Burton
- John Butler (The John Butler Trio)
- Glen Buxton (Alice Cooper)
- Roddy Byers (The Specials)

== C ==
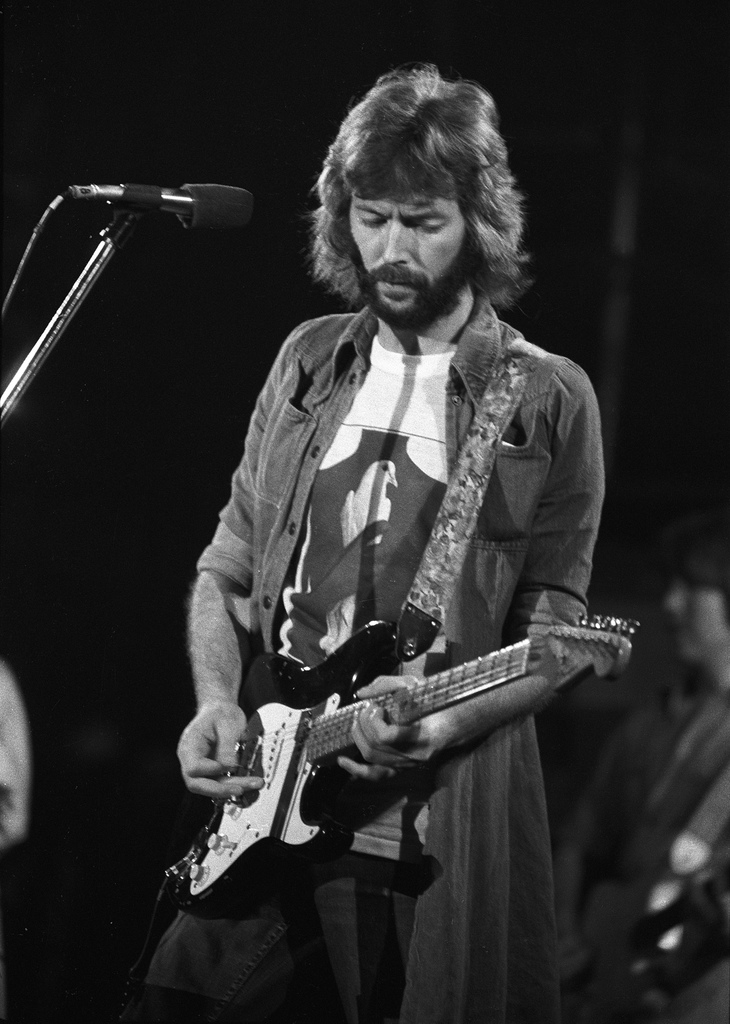
Eric Clapton, 1975

- Ernie C (Body Count)
- Charlotte Caffey (The Go-Go's)
- Al Caiola
- Randy California (Spirit)
- Toy Caldwell (The Marshall Tucker Band),
- Mike Campbell (Tom Petty and the Heartbreakers)
- Phil Campbell (Motörhead)
- Vivian Campbell (Dio, Whitesnake, Def Leppard)
- Mike Campese
- Jerry Cantrell (Alice in Chains)
- Captain Sensible (The Damned)
- Chris Carrabba (Dashboard Confessional)
- Perfecto de Castro (Rivermaya)
- Carlos Cavazo (Quiet Riot)
- Danny Cedrone (Bill Haley & His Comets)
- Gustavo Cerati (Soda Stereo)
- Nic Cester (Jet)
- Ross Childress (Collective Soul)
- Charlie Christian
- John Cipollina (Quicksilver Messenger Service, The Dinosaurs)
- Eric Clapton (The Yardbirds, Cream, Derek and the Dominos)
- Gary Clark Jr.
- Steve Clark (Def Leppard)
- "Fast" Eddie Clarke (Motörhead)
- Dave "Clem" Clempson (Colosseum, Humble Pie)
- Michael Clifford (5 Seconds of Summer)
- Nels Cline (Nels Cline Trio, The Nels Cline Singers, Banyan, Wilco)
- Kurt Cobain (Nirvana)
- Phil Collen (Def Leppard)
- Albert Collins
- Allen Collins (Lynyrd Skynyrd)
- Nathan Connolly (Snow Patrol)
- Ry Cooder
- Kyle Cook (Matchbox Twenty)
- Rusty Cooley
- John Corabi (Ratt)
- Lanny Cordola (Giuffria, House of Lords, Magdalen)
- Billy Corgan (The Smashing Pumpkins)
- Hugh Cornwell (The Stranglers)
- Graham Coxon (Blur)
- Robert Cray
- Paul Crook (Anthrax, Sebastian Bach, Meat Loaf, Marya Roxx)
- Steve Cropper (Booker T. & the M.G.'s)
- Robbin Crosby (Ratt)
- Rivers Cuomo (Weezer)
- Marcos Curiel (P.O.D.)

== D ==
- Denis D'Amour (Voivod)
- Dick Dale
- Brody Dalle (The Distillers, Spinnerette)
- Adam "Nergal" Darski (Behemoth)
- Dave Davies (The Kinks)
- Mahyar Dean (Angband)
- Paul Dean (Loverboy)
- Gene Deer
- Chris DeGarmo (Queensrÿche)
- Isaac Delahaye (Epica)
- Tiago Della Vega
- Dean DeLeo (Stone Temple Pilots)
- Tom DeLonge (Blink-182, Box Car Racer, Angels & Airwaves)
- Brad Delson (Linkin Park)
- Warren DeMartini (Ratt)
- Leonard Dembo
- Phil Demmel (Machine Head, Vio-lence)
- Britt "Lightning" Denaro (Vixen)
- Rick Derringer (The McCoys, Edgar Winter, Johnny Winter)
- C.C. DeVille (Poison)
- Don Devore (Amazing Baby)
- Buck Dharma (Blue Öyster Cult)
- Al Di Meola (Go)
- Bo Diddley
- Carl Dixon
- Ian D'Sa (Billy Talent)
- Dave Dobbyn (Th' Dudes, DD Smash)
- Joe Dolce
- Dan Donegan (Disturbed)
- Abbath Doom Occulta (Immortal, I)
- Dr. Know (Bad Brains)
- OL Drake (Evile)
- Jake Dreyer (Iced Earth)
- Oscar Dronjak (Ceremonial Oath)
- Glen Drover (King Diamond, Megadeth, Eidolon)
- Billy Duffy (The Cult)
- Jeff "Mantas" Dunn (Venom)
- Bob Dylan
- Teddy Diaz (The Dawn)
- Perf De Castro (Rivermaya)

== E ==
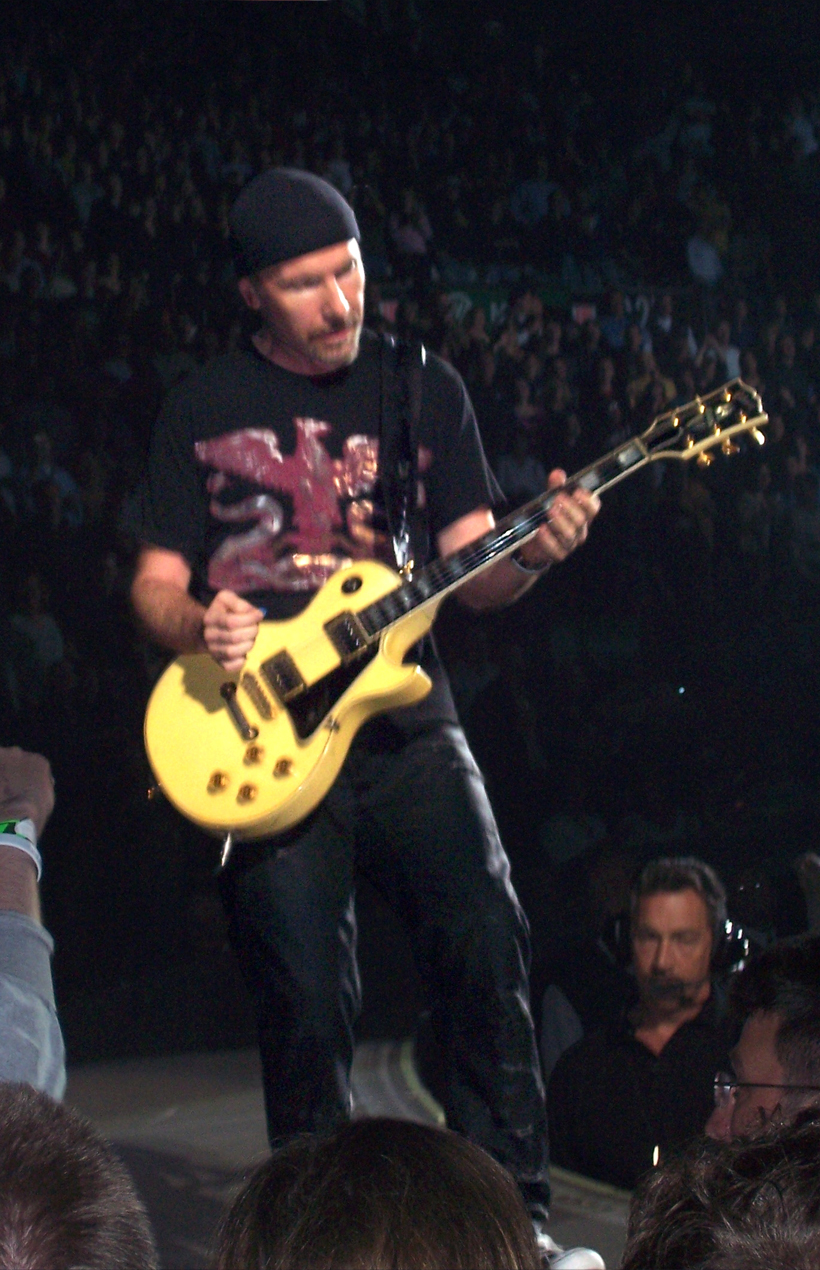
The Edge, 2005

- Ronnie Earl
- Elliot Easton (The Cars)
- Duane Eddy
- The Edge (U2)
- Lu Edmonds (Public Image Limited)
- Nokie Edwards (The Ventures)
- Mike Einziger (Incubus)
- Tripp Eisen (Dope, Static-X)
- Tinsley Ellis
- Stefan Elmgren (HammerFall)
- Matt Embree (The Sound Of Animals Fighting, Rx Bandits)
- Tommy Emmanuel
- Rik Emmett (Triumph)
- Niklas Engelin
- Thomas Erak (The Fall Of Troy)
- Eric Erlandson (Hole, RRIICCEE)
- Kevin Eubanks (The Tonight Show Band)
- Mike Elgar (Rivermaya)

== F ==
- Mark Farner (Grand Funk Railroad)
- Tim Farriss (INXS)
- Josh Farro (Paramore)
- Don Felder (The Eagles)
- Neil Finn (Split Enz, Crowded House, Finn Brothers)
- Roger Fisher (Heart)
- Vic Flick (John Barry Seven)
- John Fogerty (Creedence Clearwater Revival)
- Lita Ford (The Runaways)
- Jon Foreman (Switchfoot)
- Dave Fortman (Ugly Kid Joe)
- Oz Fox (Stryper)
- Peter Frampton (Humble Pie)
- Bruce Franklin (Trouble)
- Lars Frederiksen (Rancid)
- Ace Frehley (Kiss)
- Glenn Frey (The Eagles)
- Marty Friedman (Megadeth, Cacophony)
- Robert Fripp (King Crimson)
- Fred Frith
- Bill Frisell
- John Frusciante (Red Hot Chili Peppers)
- Vim Fuego (Bad News)
- Koichi Fukuda (Static-X)
- Jim Fuller (Surfaris)

== G ==
- Gus G. (Dream Evil, Firewind, Nightrage, Ozzy Osbourne)
- Steve Gaines (Lynyrd Skynyrd)
- Galder (Dimmu Borgir)
- Noel Gallagher (Oasis)
- Rory Gallagher
- Anthony Gallo (Suicidal Tendencies)
- Cliff Gallup
- Frank Gambale (Chick Corea Elektric Band)
- Jerry Garcia (Grateful Dead)
- Roopam Garg
- Kyle Gass (Tenacious D)
- Synyster Gates (Avenged Sevenfold, Pinkly Smooth)
- J. Geils
- Björn Gelotte (In Flames)
- Rocky George (Cro-Mags, Suicidal Tendencies)
- Janick Gers (Iron Maiden)
- Sascha Gerstner (Helloween, ex-Freedom Call)
- Billy Gibbons (ZZ Top)
- Chad Gilbert (New Found Glory)
- Paul Gilbert (Racer X, Mr. Big)
- Vince Gill
- Brad Gillis (Night Ranger, Ozzy Osbourne)
- David Gilmour (Pink Floyd)
- Greg Ginn (Black Flag)
- Hamish Glencross (My Dying Bride)
- Craig Goldy (Giuffria, Dio, Rough Cutt)
- Matt Good (From First to Last)
- Myles Goodwyn (April Wine)
- Pier Gonella (Mastercastle-Necrodeath)
- Scott Gorham (Thin Lizzy, 21 Guns)
- Guthrie Govan (The Aristocrats, Steven Wilson)
- The Great Kat
- Gary Green (Gentle Giant)
- Grant Green
- Peter Green (Fleetwood Mac)
- Brian Greenway (April Wine, Mashmakhan)
- Jonny Greenwood (Radiohead, The Smile)
- Luther Grosvenor (Spooky Tooth, Mott the Hoople)
- Tracii Guns (L.A. Guns, Brides of Destruction, Contraband)
- Buddy Guy

== H ==
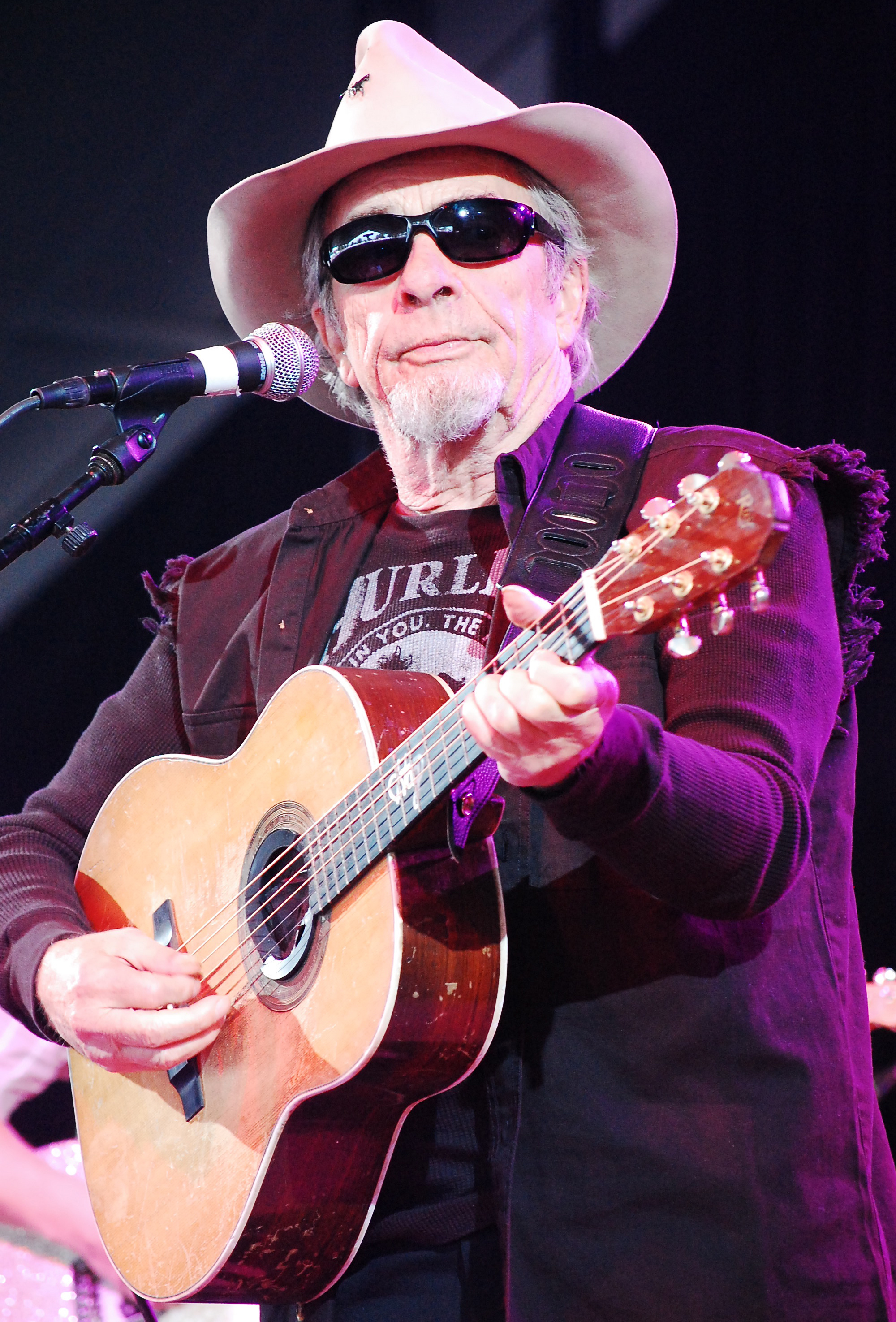
Merle Haggard, 2009

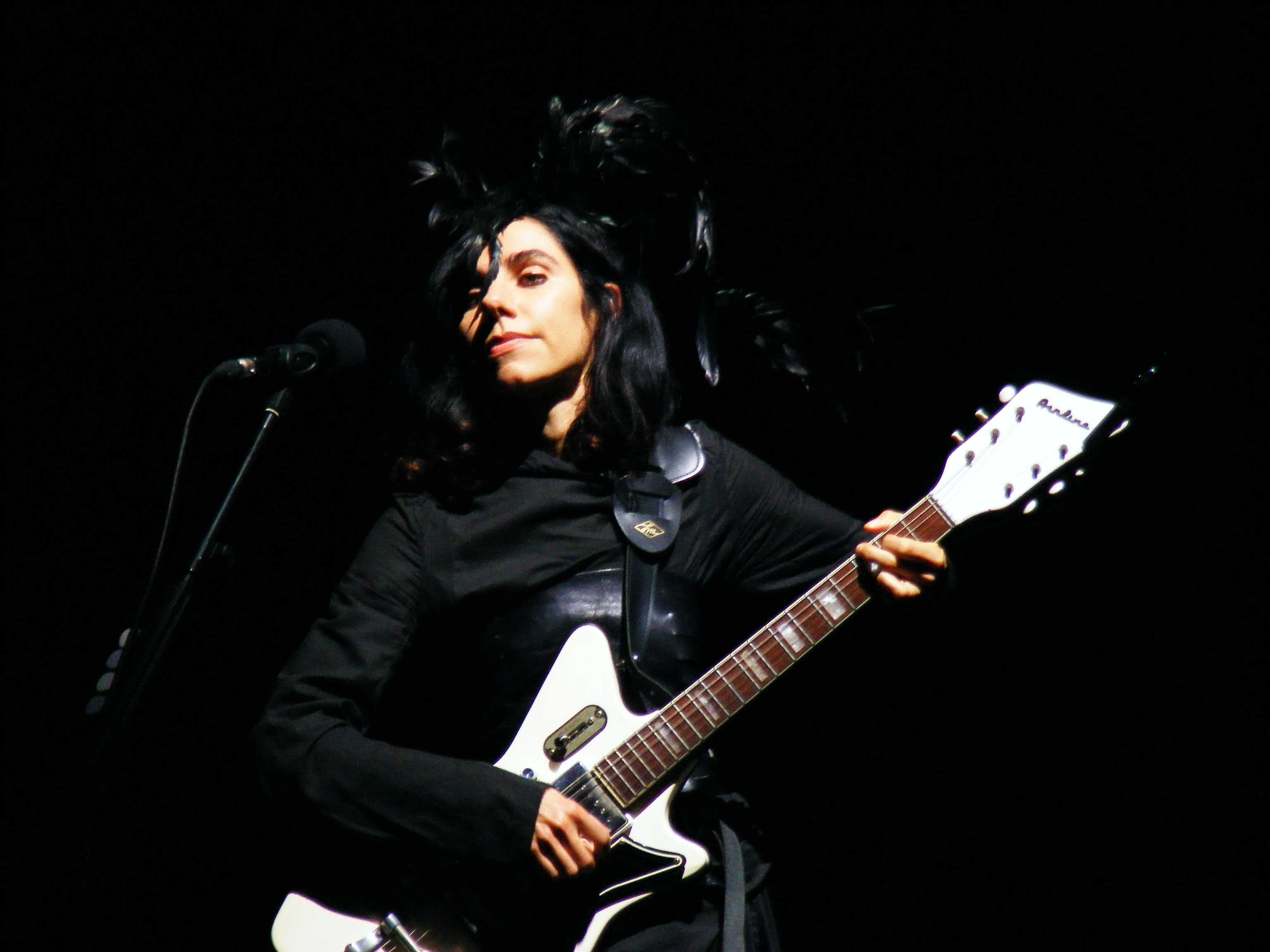
PJ Harvey, 2011

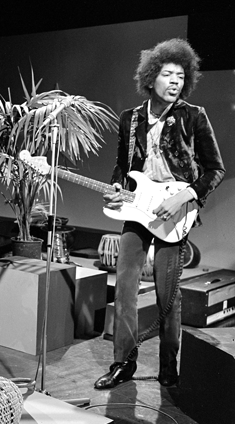
Jimi Hendrix, 1967

- Steve Hackett (Genesis)
- Merle Haggard
- Danielle Haim (Haim)
- Ollie Halsall (Patto, Tempest)
- Kirk Hammett (Exodus, Metallica)
- Albert Hammond, Jr. (The Strokes)
- Jeff Hanneman (Slayer)
- Kai Hansen (Helloween, Gamma Ray)
- Randy Hansen
- Blake Harnage (VersaEmerge)
- George Harrison (The Beatles, Traveling Wilburys)
- PJ Harvey
- Juliana Hatfield
- Dan Hawkins (The Darkness, Stone Gods)
- Justin Hawkins (The Darkness)
- Pete Haycock (Climax Blues Band)
- Warren Haynes (The Allman Brothers Band, Gov't Mule)
- Justin Hayward (The Moody Blues)
- Eddie Hazel (Parliament-Funkadelic)
- Jeff Healey
- Helmuth
- Jimi Hendrix
- Leon Hendrix
- Jimmy Herring (Widespread Panic)
- Greg Hetson (Circle Jerks, Bad Religion)
- Tony Hicks (The Hollies)
- hide (X Japan)
- Dave Hill (Slade)
- Brent Hinds (Mastodon)
- Josh Homme (Queens of the Stone Age, Kyuss)
- Hisashi (Glay)
- Hizaki (Versailles, Jupiter)
- Terrance Hobbs (Suffocation)
- Gary Hoey
- Wolf Hoffmann (Accept)
- Susanna Hoffs (The Bangles)
- Randy Holden
- Allan Holdsworth
- Buddy Holly
- Esa Holopainen (Amorphis)
- Gary Holt (Exodus)
- Jason Hook (Five Finger Death Punch)
- John Lee Hooker
- Matt Hoopes (Relient K)
- Jerry Horton (Papa Roach)
- Tomoyasu Hotei (Boøwy, Complex)
- Jimmy Hotz
- Rowland S. Howard
- Steve Howe (Yes, Asia)
- Bill Hudson (Cellador, Power Quest)
- Jon Hume (Evermore)
- Charlie Hunter

== I ==
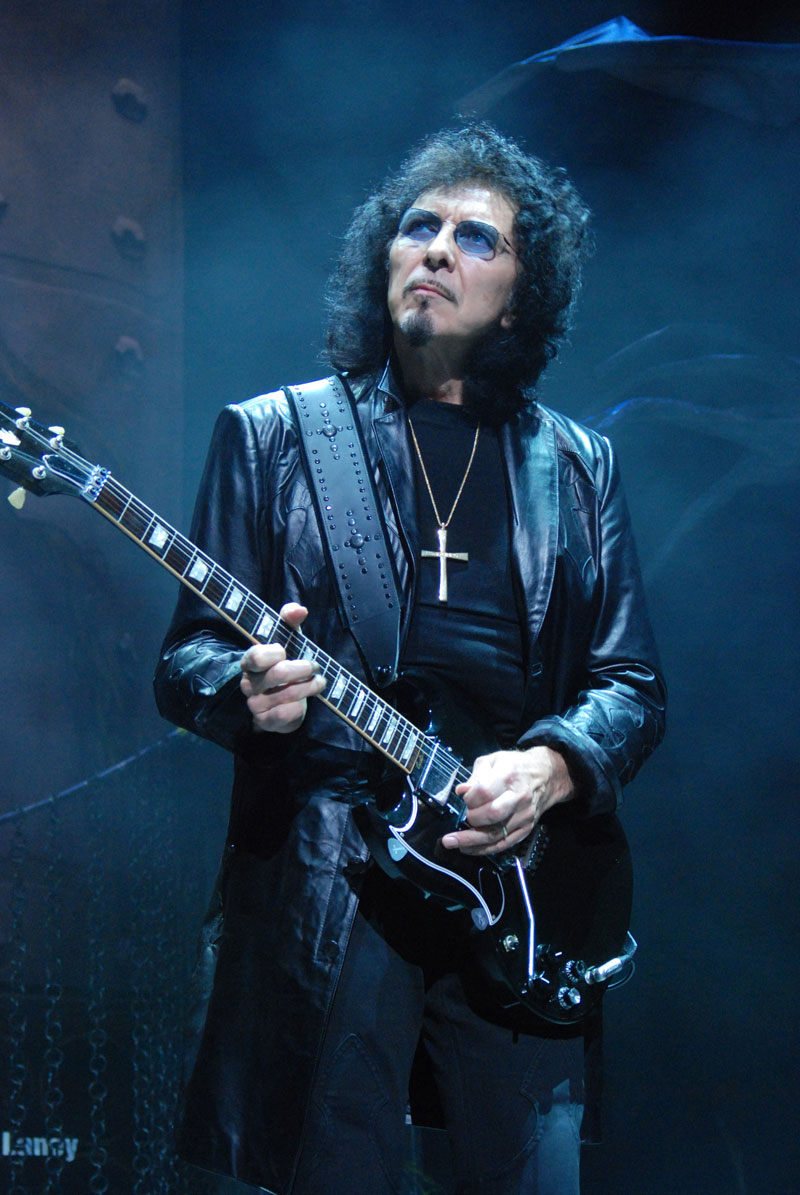
Tony Iommi, 2009

- Chris Impellitteri
- Tony Iommi (Black Sabbath, Heaven & Hell)
- Ernie Isley (The Isley Brothers)
- Poison Ivy (The Cramps)
- Izzy Stradlin (Guns N' Roses)
- Kenneth Ilagan (The Dawn)

== J ==
- Matthias Jabs (Scorpions)
- Ramon Jacinto
- Tito Jackson (The Jackson 5)
- Jakko M. Jakszyk
- Colin James
- Ron Jarzombek (Watchtower, Spastic Ink, Blotted Science)
- John 5
- Bob Johnson (Steeleye Span)
- Eric Johnson
- Kelly Johnson (Girlschool)
- Lonnie Johnson
- Wilko Johnson (Dr Feelgood)
- Ruud Jolie (Within Temptation)
- Kevin Jonas (Jonas Brothers)
- Adam Jones (Tool)
- Brian Jones (The Rolling Stones)
- Danny Jones (McFly)
- Mick Jones (The Clash)
- Mick Jones (Foreigner, Spooky Tooth)
- Steve Jones (Sex Pistols)
- Stanley Jordan
- Tyler Joseph (Twenty One Pilots)

== K ==
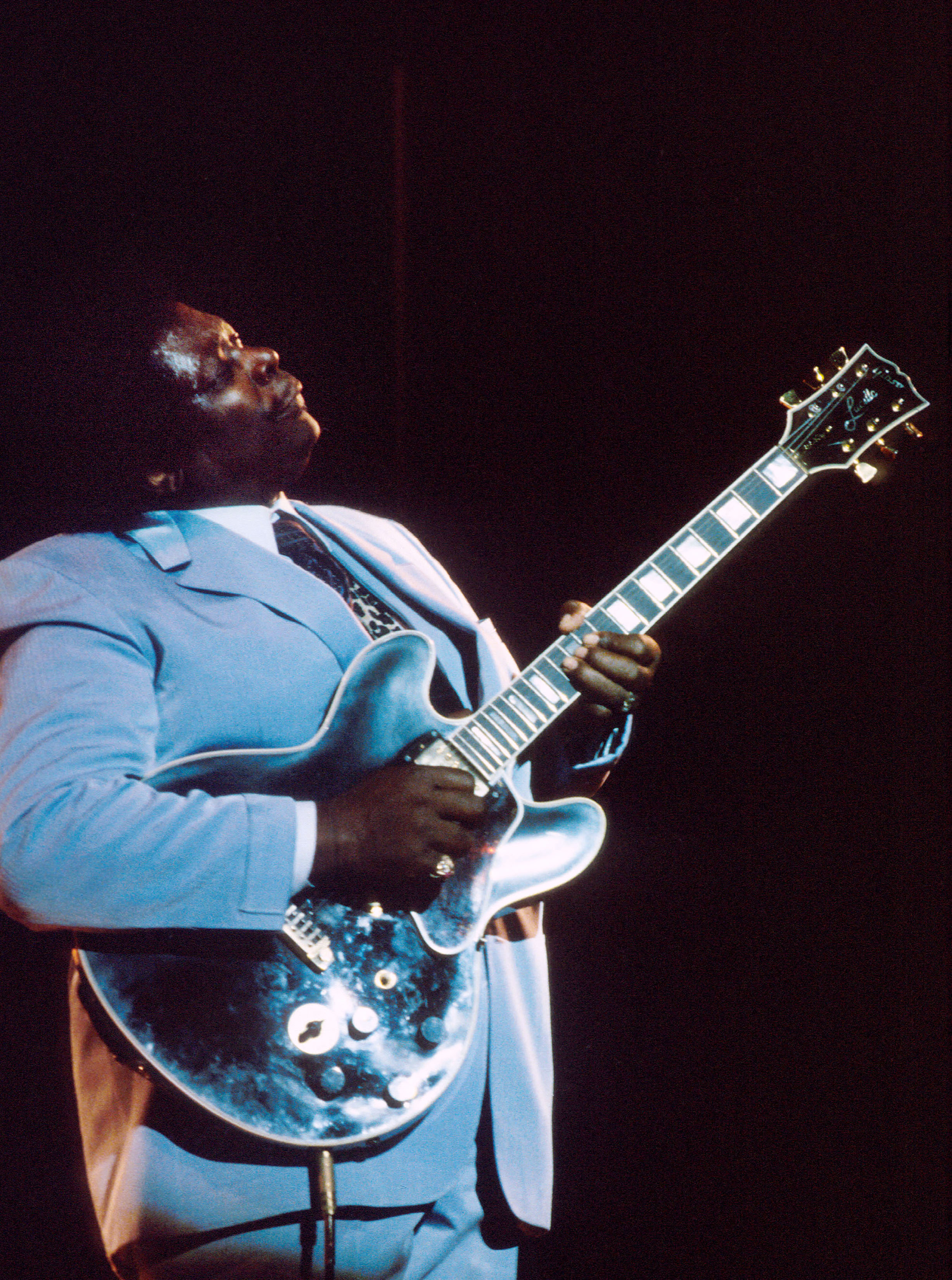
B.B. King, 1985

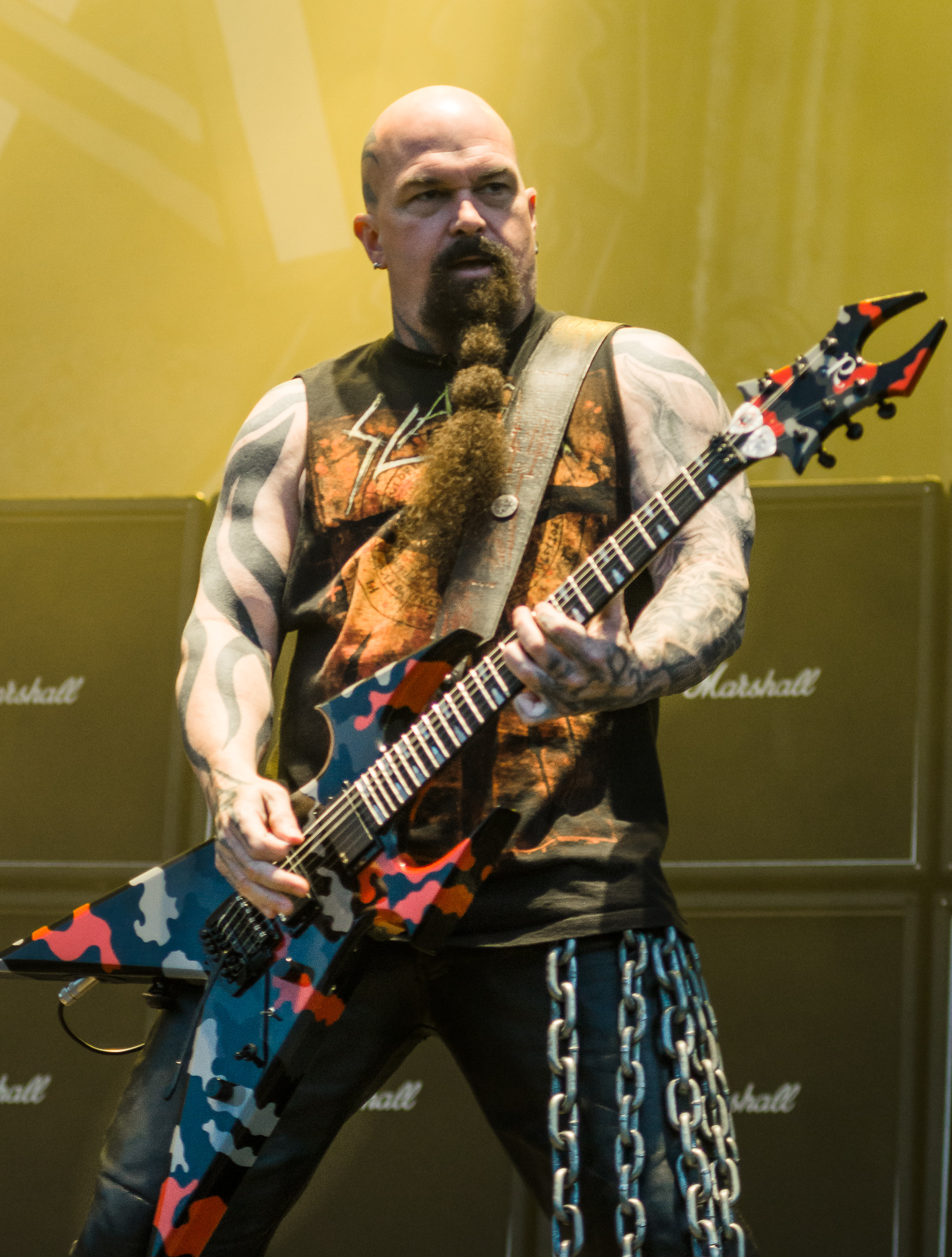
Kerry King, 2012

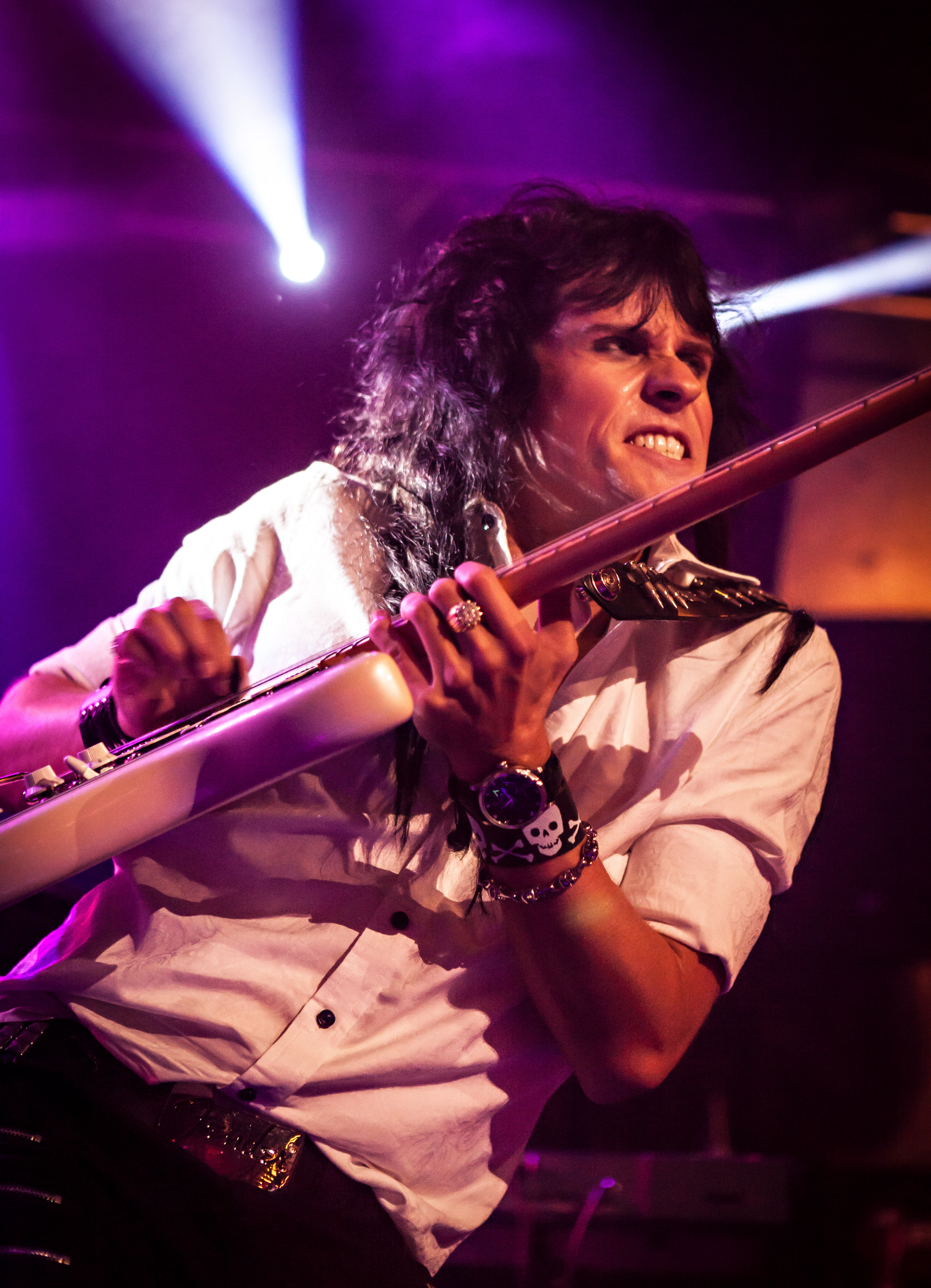
Rocky Kramer performing live in 2018

- Kapil Srivastava
- Alex Kapranos (Franz Ferdinand)
- Terry Kath (Chicago)
- Jorma Kaukonen (Jefferson Airplane, Hot Tuna)
- Lenny Kaye (Patti Smith Group)
- Phil Keaggy (Glass Harp)
- Tom Keifer (Cinderella)
- Tim Kelly (Slaughter)
- Ken (L'Arc-en-Ciel)
- Alan Kendall (The Bee Gees)
- Myles Kennedy (The Mayfield Four)
- Albert King
- B. B. King
- Ben King (The Yardbirds)
- Ed King (Lynyrd Skynyrd, Strawberry Alarm Clock)
- Kerry King (Slayer)
- Danny Kirwan (Fleetwood Mac)
- Andreas Kisser (Sepultura)
- Josh Klinghoffer (Red Hot Chili Peppers)
- Bob Klose (Pink Floyd)
- Mark Knopfler (Dire Straits)
- Kaan Korad
- Joel Kosche (Collective Soul)
- Paul Kossoff (Free)
- Richie Kotzen
- Ivan Kral
- Rocky Kramer
- Wayne Kramer (MC5)
- Robby Krieger (The Doors)
- Richard Kruspe (Rammstein)
- Tad Kubler
- Jan Kuehnemund (Vixen)
- Bruce Kulick (Kiss)

== L ==
- Bernie LaBarge (David Clayton-Thomas)
- Alexi Laiho (Children of Bodom, Bodom After Midnight)
- Greg Lake (Emerson Lake & Palmer, King Crimson)
- Larry LaLonde (Possessed, Primus)
- Sonny Landreth
- Shawn Lane
- Jonny Lang
- Andy LaRocque (King Diamond)
- Andrew Latimer (Camel)
- Ronni Le Tekrø (TNT)
- Bernie Leadon (The Eagles)
- Alvin Lee (Ten Years After)
- Jake E. Lee (Ozzy Osbourne, Badlands)
- Duke Levine
- Herman Li (DragonForce)
- Alex Lifeson (Rush)
- Jani Liimatainen (Sonata Arctica, Altaria)
- Peter Lindgren (Opeth)
- Rudy Linka
- Lori Linstruth
- James Litherland (Colosseum, Mogul Thrash)
- Kerry Livgren (Kansas)
- Glenn Ljungström (In Flames, HammerFall)
- Nils Lofgren (E Street Band)
- Karl Logan (Manowar)
- Jeff Loomis (Arch Enemy, Nevermore)
- César "Vampiro" López (Maná, Azul Violeta, Jaguares)
- Kiko Loureiro (Megadeth, Angra)
- Clint Lowery (Sevendust)
- Arjen Anthony Lucassen
- Paco de Lucía
- Jens Ludwig (Edguy)
- Steve Lukather (Toto)
- George Lynch (Dokken, Lynch Mob)
- Steve Lynch (Autograph)
- Jeff Lynne (Electric Light Orchestra)

== M ==
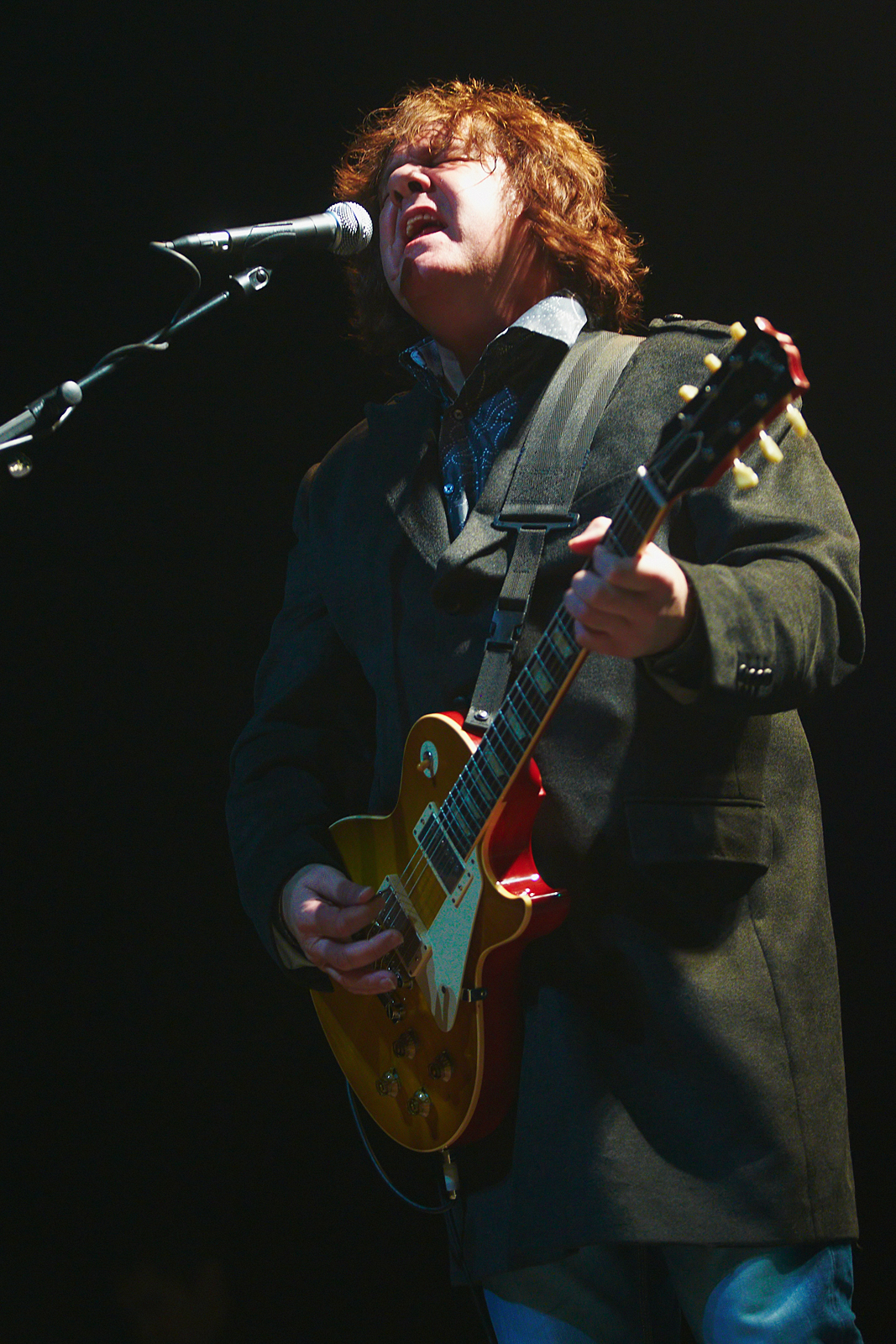
Gary Moore, 2010

- Tony MacAlpine
- Lonnie Mack
- Brian "Too Loud" MacLeod (Chilliwack, Headpins)
- Logan Mader (Once Human, Soulfly, Machine Head)
- Wolf Mail
- Daron Malakian (System of a Down, Scars on Broadway)
- Yngwie Malmsteen
- Christofer Malmström
- Misha Mansoor (Periphery)
- Kee Marcello (Europe)
- Frank Marino (Mahogany Rush)
- Johnny Marr (The Smiths)
- Steve Marriott (Small Faces, Humble Pie)
- Mick Mars (Mötley Crüe)
- Vince Martell (Vanilla Fudge)
- Jim Martin (Faith No More)
- Hank Marvin (The Shadows)
- Junior Marvin (Bob Marley and The Wailers)
- J Mascis (Dinosaur Jr)
- Dave Mason (Traffic)
- Hideto Matsumoto (X Japan)
- Tak Matsumoto (B'z)
- Brian May (Queen)
- John Mayer (John Mayer Trio, Dead & Company)
- Nick McCabe (The Verve)
- Andy McCoy (Hanoi Rocks)
- Mike McCready (Pearl Jam, Temple of the Dog, Mad Season)
- Jimmy McCulloch (Wings, Thunderclap Newman, Stone the Crows, Small Faces, The Dukes)
- Roger McGuinn (The Byrds)
- John McLaughlin (Mahavishnu Orchestra, Shakti)
- Richard McNamara (Embrace)
- Tony McPhee (The Groundhogs)
- Siouxsie Medley (Dead Sara)
- Rickey Medlocke (Blackfoot, Lynyrd Skynyrd)
- Mickey "Deen Ween" Melchiondo (Ween)
- Michelle Meldrum (Phantom Blue, Meldrum)
- Barry Melton (Country Joe & The Fish)
- Vince Melouney (Billy Thorpe & the Aztecs, The Bee Gees)
- Dave Meniketti (Y&T)
- Jim Messina (Poco, Buffalo Springfield, Loggins and Messina)
- Naser Mestarihi
- Pat Metheny
- Phil Miller
- Steve Miller
- Brian Molko (Placebo)
- Wes Montgomery
- Ronnie Montrose (Montrose, Gamma)
- Ben Moody (Evanescence)
- Gary Moore (Thin Lizzy)
- Scotty Moore
- Thurston Moore (Sonic Youth)
- Vinnie Moore (UFO)
- Tom Morello (Rage Against the Machine, Audioslave)
- Sterling Morrison (The Velvet Underground)
- Alan Morse (Spock's Beard)
- Steve Morse (Dixie Dregs, Steve Morse Band, Deep Purple)
- Ian Moss (Cold Chisel)
- Jason Moss (Cherry Poppin' Daddies)
- Bob Mothersbaugh (Devo)
- Cameron Muncey (Jet)
- Christian Münzner (Obscura)
- Billy Mure
- James Murphy (Obituary)
- Dave Murray (Iron Maiden)
- Dave Mustaine (Megadeth, Metallica)
- Zach Myers (Shinedown)
- Gary Myrick (Havana 3am)

== N ==
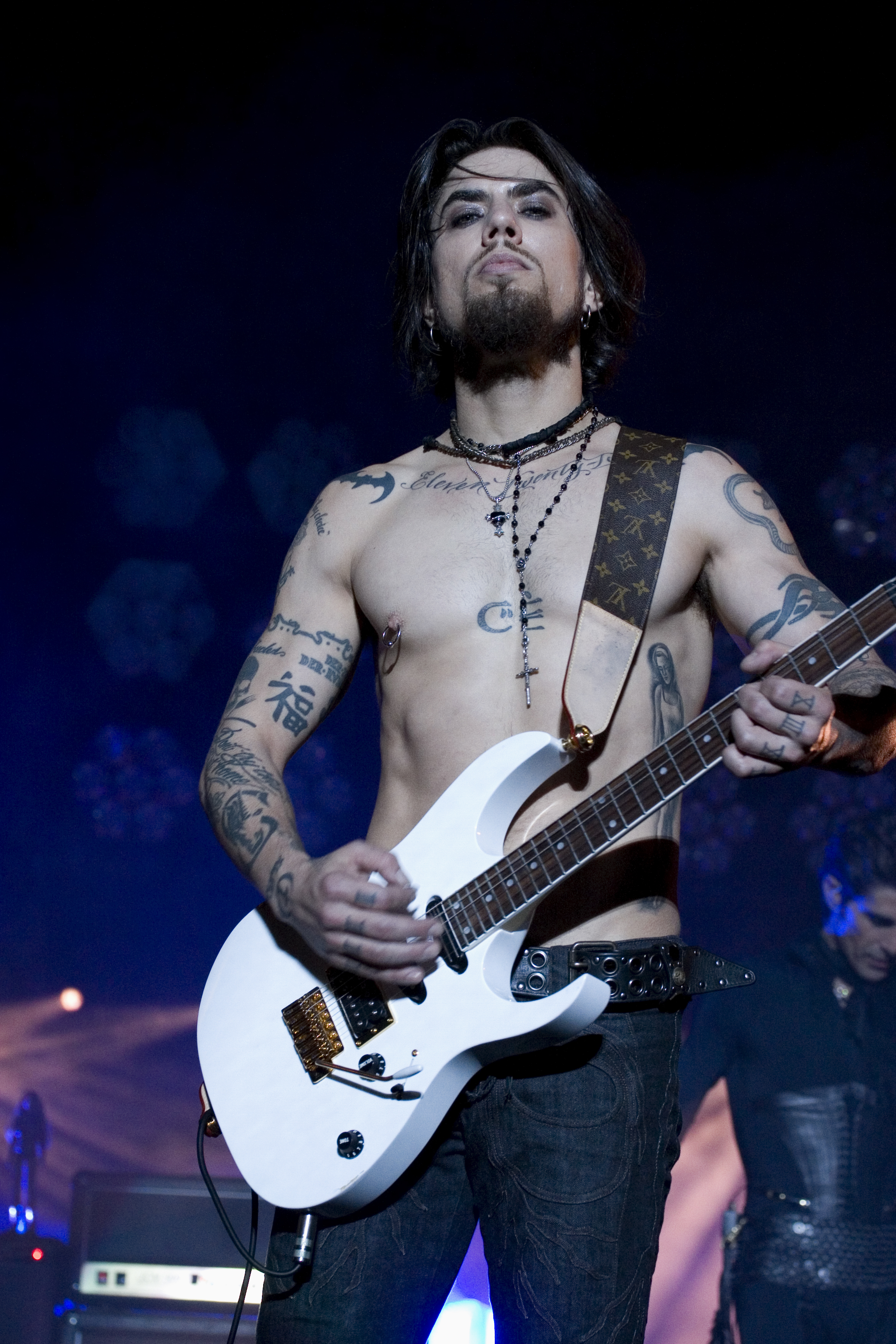
Dave Navarro, Santa Barbara 2008

- Dave Navarro (Jane's Addiction, Red Hot Chili Peppers)
- Mike Ness (Social Distortion)
- Craig Nicholls (The Vines)
- Rick Nielsen (Cheap Trick)
- Jon Nödtveidt (Dissection)
- John Nolan (Taking Back Sunday)
- Noodle (Gorillaz)
- Noodles (The Offspring)
- Pontus Norgren (The Poodles, HammerFall)
- John Norum (Europe)
- Ted Nugent (Amboy Dukes, Damn Yankees)
- Anders Nyström (Katatonia, Bloodbath)

== O ==
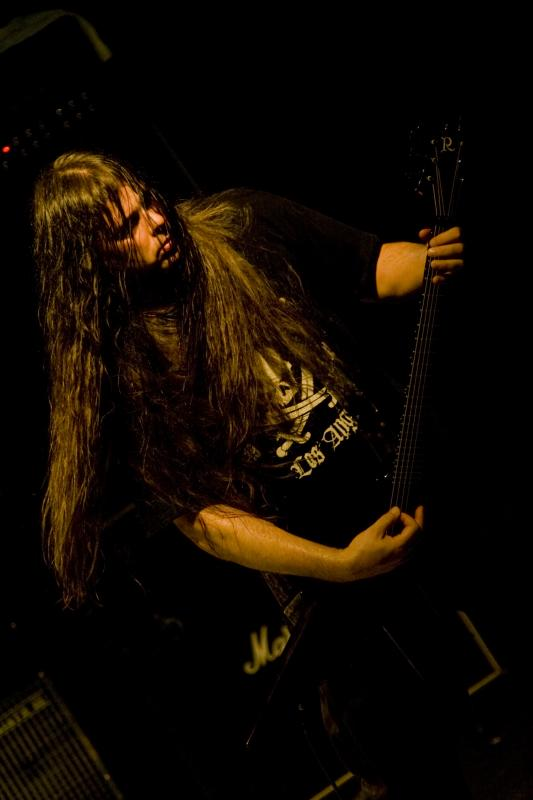
Pat O'Brien performing live with Cannibal Corpse.

- Jus Oborn (Electric Wizard)
- Ed O'Brien (Radiohead)
- Pat O'Brien (Cannibal Corpse, Nevermore, Exhorder)
- Eddie Ojeda (Twisted Sister)
- Dave Odlum (The Frames)
- André Olbrich (Blind Guardian)
- Mike Oldfield
- Criss Oliva (Savatage)
- Juan Francisco Ordóñez
- Buzz Osborne (Melvins)

== P ==
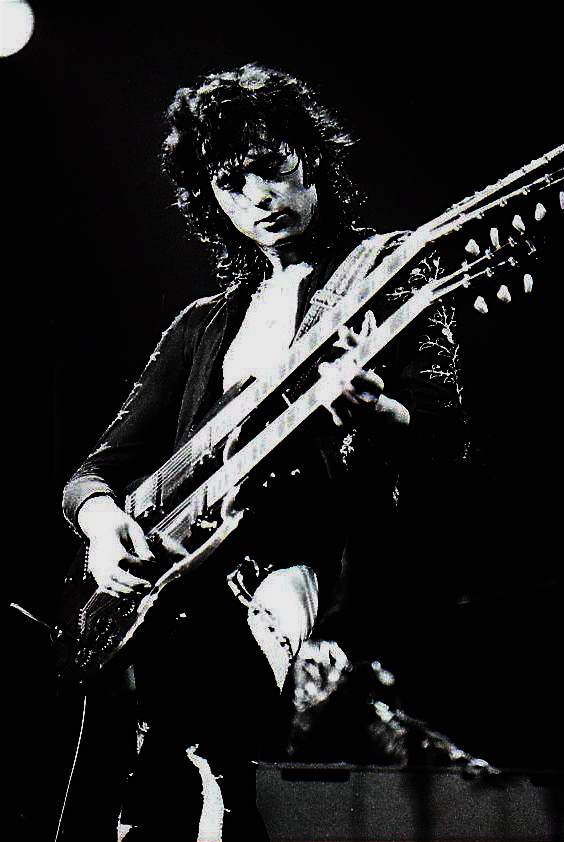
Jimmy Page of Led Zeppelin playing double-necked guitar onstage in 1973

- Jimmy Page (Led Zeppelin, The Yardbirds, The Firm)
- Clive Painter (Broken Dog, The 99 Call, Tram, The Real Tuesday Weld)
- Brad Paisley
- Orianthi Panagaris
- Joe Pass
- Les Paul
- Michal Pavlíček
- Axel Rudi Pell
- Tony Peluso (The Carpenters)
- Carl Perkins
- Luther Perkins (Johnny Cash)
- Nick Perri (Silvertide)
- Joe Perry (Aerosmith, The Joe Perry Project)
- Vicki Peterson (The Bangles)
- John Petrucci (Dream Theater, Liquid Tension Experiment)
- Anthony Phillips (Genesis)
- Matt Pike (Sleep, High on Fire)
- Jake Pitts (Black Veil Brides)
- Sergio Pizzorno (Kasabian)
- Dean Pleasants (Suicidal Tendencies)
- Chris Poland (Megadeth)
- Andy Powell (Wishbone Ash)
- Prince
- Rod Price (Foghat)
- Jade Puget (AFI)

== Q ==
- Quorthon (Bathory)

== R ==
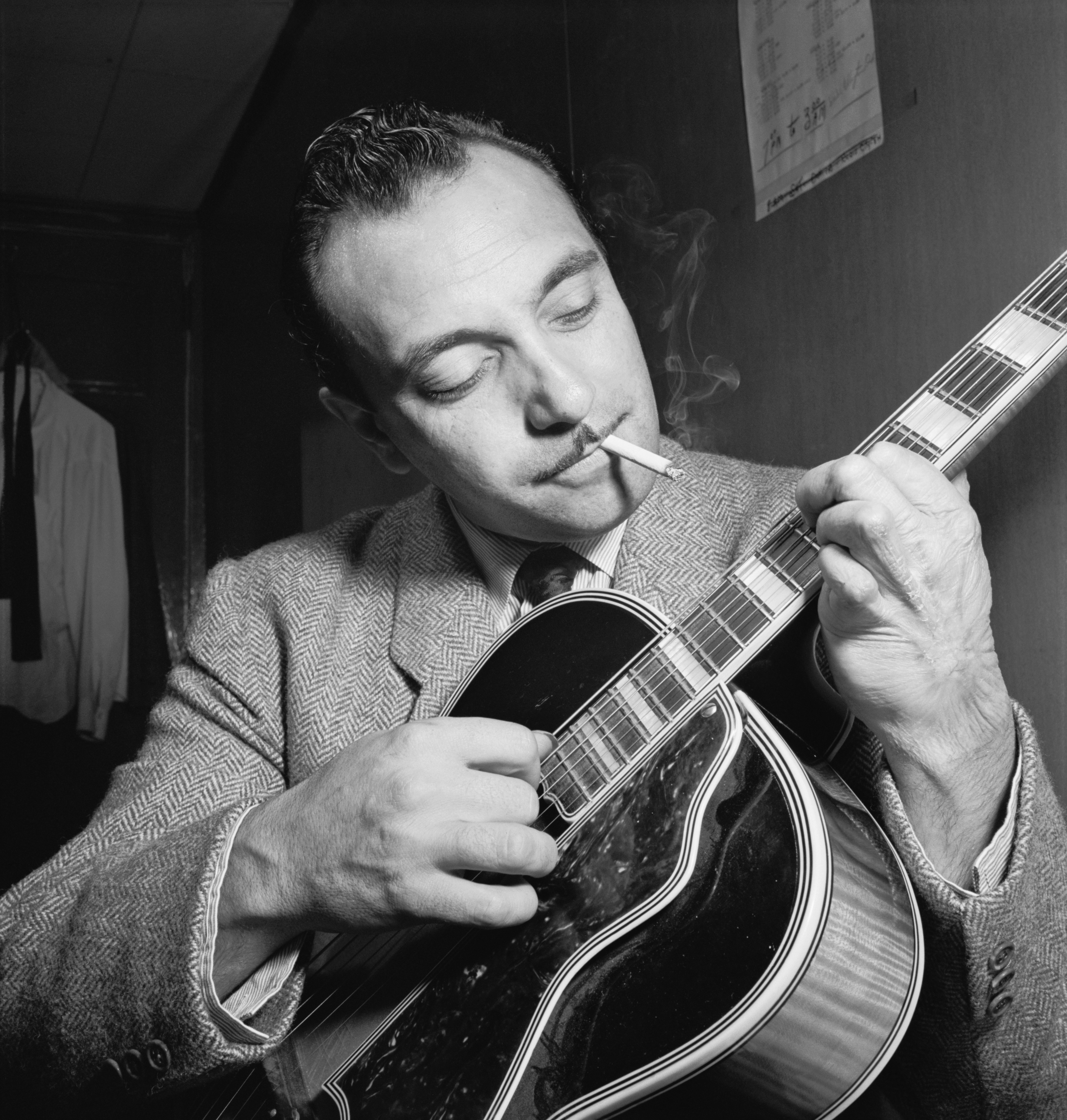
Django Reinhardt

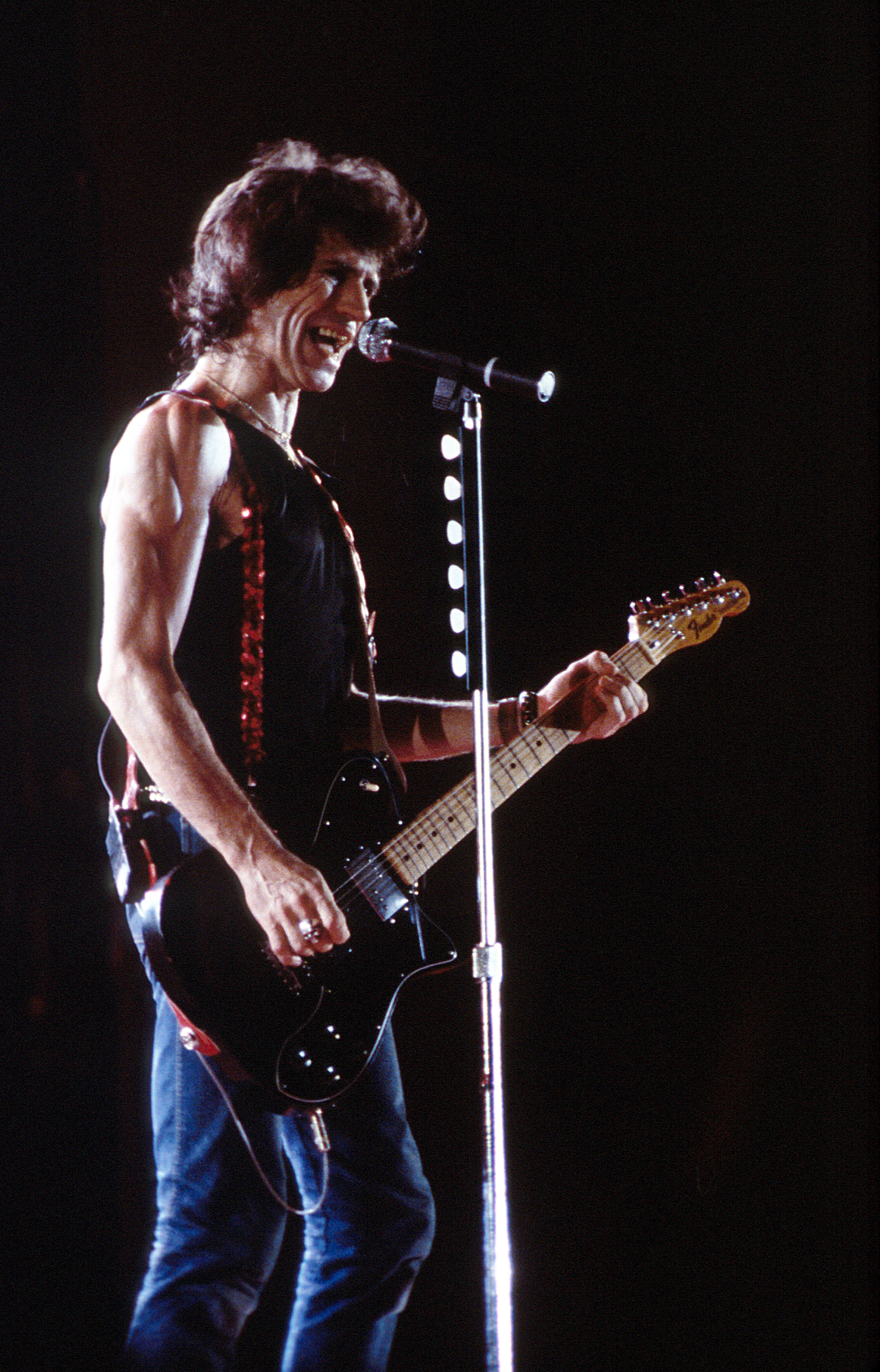
Keith Richards, 1982

- Roddy Radiation (The Specials)
- Mick Ralphs (Bad Company, Mott the Hoople)
- Larry Ramos (The Association)
- Lee Ranaldo (Sonic Youth)
- Chris Rea
- Jerry Reed
- Lou Reed (The Velvet Underground)
- Vernon Reid (Living Colour)
- Django Reinhardt
- Arthur Rhames
- Randy Rhoads (Quiet Riot, Ozzy Osbourne)
- Keith Richards (The Rolling Stones)
- Gary Richrath (REO Speedwagon)
- Henjo Richter (Gamma Ray)
- Michael Ricketts
- Chris Risola (Steelheart)
- Marc Rizzo (Soulfly, Cavalera Conspiracy, Ill Niño)
- Jason Roberts (Norah Jones, Hymns, The Candles)
- Darrell Roberts (Five Finger Death Punch)
- Allison Robertson (The Donnas)
- Brian Robertson (Thin Lizzy, Motörhead)
- Robbie Robertson (The Band)
- Janet Robin
- Omar Rodríguez-López (At the Drive-In, Mars Volta)
- Tony Rombola (Godsmack, Another Animal)
- Michael Romeo (Symphony X)
- Mick Ronson (David Bowie)
- Joe Don Rooney (Rascal Flatts)
- Jim Root (Slipknot, Stone Sour)
- Chris Rörland (Sabaton)
- Ryan Ross (Panic! at the Disco)
- Francis Rossi (Status Quo)
- Gary Rossington (Lynyrd Skynyrd)
- Uli Jon Roth (Scorpions)
- Steve Rothery (Marillion, The Wishing Tree)
- Erik Rutan (Ripping Corpse, Morbid Angel, Hate Eternal, Cannibal Corpse)
- Johnny Rzeznik (Goo Goo Dolls)
- Francis Reyes (The Dawn)

== S ==
- Dave "The Snake" Sabo (Skid Row)
- Richie Sambora (Bon Jovi)
- Karl Sanders (Nile)
- Justin Sane (Anti-Flag)
- Carlos Santana (Santana)
- Joey Santiago (Pixies)
- Ralph Santolla (Obituary, Deicide)
- Satchel (Steel Panther)
- Joe Satriani
- Philip Sayce (Jeff Healy, Melissa Etheridge)
- Matt Scannell (Vertical Horizon)
- Michael Schenker (Scorpions, UFO, Michael Schenker Group, Contraband)
- Tom Scholz (Boston)
- Neal Schon (Journey)
- Jeff Schroeder (The Smashing Pumpkins)
- Chuck Schuldiner (Death, Control Denied)
- John Scofield
- Andy Scott (Sweet)
- Keith Scott (Bryan Adams)
- Tim Scott
- Sek Loso (Loso)
- Darius Semaña (Parokya ni Edgar)
- Brian Setzer (The Stray Cats)
- Charlie Sexton (Charlie Sexton)
- James "Munky" Shaffer (Korn)
- Dave Sharman
- Todd Sharpville
- Sonny Sharrock
- Kenny Wayne Shepherd
- Kevin Shields (My Bloody Valentine)
- Chris Shiflett (Foo Fighters)
- George Shuffler (The Stanley Brothers)
- Charlie Simpson (Fightstar, Busted)
- Sami Sirviö (Kent)
- Matt Skiba (Alkaline Trio)
- Alex Skolnick (Testament, Savatage, Trans-Siberian Orchestra)
- Skwisgaar Skwigelf (Dethklok)
- Slash (Guns N' Roses, Velvet Revolver, Slash's Snakepit)
- Martin Slattery (The Mescaleros)
- Earl Slick
- Hillel Slovak (Red Hot Chili Peppers)
- Brendon Small (Dethklok)
- Adrian Smith (Iron Maiden)
- Fred "Sonic" Smith (MC-5)
- Robert Smith (The Cure)
- Bruce Springsteen (E Street Band)
- Billy Squier
- John Squire (The Stone Roses, The Seahorses)
- Mark St. John (Kiss)
- Bill Steer (Carcass)
- Leigh Stephens (Blue Cheer, Sister Ray)
- Steve Stevens (Billy Idol)
- James Stevenson (Gene Loves Jezebel, The Alarm)
- Travis Stever (Coheed and Cambria)
- Gina Stile (Vixen)
- Stephen Stills (Buffalo Springfield, Crosby, Stills, Nash & Young)
- Barry Stock (Three Days Grace)
- Andrew Stockdale (Wolfmother)
- Nita Strauss (The Iron Maidens, Femme Fatale)
- Patrick Stump (Fall Out Boy)
- Sugizo (Luna Sea, X Japan)
- Frankie Sullivan (Survivor)
- Tim Sult (Clutch)
- Hubert Sumlin
- Andy Summers (The Police)
- Bernard Sumner (Joy Division, New Order)
- Niklas Sundin (Dark Tranquillity)
- Roman Surman (Wednesday 13, Murderdolls)
- Michael Sweet (Stryper)
- John Sykes (Tygers of Pan Tang, Thin Lizzy, Whitesnake)
- Red Symons (Skyhooks)
- Syu (Galneryus, Animetal)

== T ==
- Ty Tabor (King's X)
- Joey Tafolla
- Akira Takasaki (Loudness)
- Marv Tarplin (Smokey Robinson and The Miracles, Smokey Robinson)
- Andy Taylor (Duran Duran)
- Mick Taylor (John Mayall and the Bluesbreakers, The Rolling Stones)
- Bobby Tench (Streetwalkers, Hummingbird, Van Morrison, Topper Headon)
- Octave Octavian Teodorescu
- Thomas Thacker (Sum 41)
- Tommy Thayer (Black 'N' Blue, Kiss)
- Kim Thayil (Soundgarden)
- Hughie Thomasson (Outlaws)
- Mick Thomson (Slipknot)
- Porl Thompson (The Cure)
- Richard Thompson
- Fredrik Thordendal (Meshuggah)
- George Thorogood
- Johnny Thunders (New York Dolls, The Heartbreakers)
- Steve Tibbetts
- Andy Timmons (Danger Danger)
- Glenn Tipton (Judas Priest)
- Timo Tolkki (Stratovarius)
- Simon Tong (The Verve, The Shining, The Good, the Bad & the Queen)
- Ray Toro (My Chemical Romance)
- Sam Totman (DragonForce)
- Devin Townsend (Strapping Young Lad)
- Pete Townshend (The Who)
- Pat Travers
- Mark Tremonti (Alter Bridge, Creed)
- Greg Tribbett (Mudvayne, Hellyeah)
- Joe Trohman (Fall Out Boy)
- Robin Trower (Procol Harum)
- Derek Trucks (The Allman Brothers Band, Tedeschi Trucks Band)
- Nigel Tufnel (Lenny and the Squigtones, Spinal Tap)
- Luca Turilli
- Alex Turner (Arctic Monkeys)
- Steve Turner (Mudhoney)
- Ted Turner (Wishbone Ash)

== U ==
- Keith Urban

== V ==
- Steve Vai
- Nick Valensi (The Strokes)
- James Valentine (Maroon 5)
- Sergio Vallín (Maná)
- Eddie Van Halen (Van Halen)
- Troy Van Leeuwen (Queens of the Stone Age)
- Steve Van Zandt (E Street Band)
- Adrian Vandenberg (Vandenberg, Whitesnake, Manic Eden)
- Jimmie Vaughan
- Stevie Ray Vaughan
- Suzanne Vega
- Tom Verlaine (Television)
- Jacky Vincent (Falling in Reverse)
- Vinnie Vincent (Kiss)
- Virus (Dope, Lords of Acid, Device)
- Doyle Wolfgang von Frankenstein (Misfits, Kryst The Conqueror, Gorgeous Frankenstein)
- Emppu Vuorinen (Nightwish)

== W ==
- Paul Waggoner (Between the Buried and Me)
- Dick Wagner
- Butch Walker (SouthGang)
- Chris Walla (Death Cab for Cutie)
- Joe Walsh (James Gang, The Eagles)
- Rich Ward (Stuck Mojo, Fozzy)
- Steve Wariner
- Baz Warne (The Stranglers)
- Kevin "Noodles" Wasserman (The Offspring)
- Jeff Waters (Annihilator)
- Muddy Waters
- Jeff Watson (Night Ranger)
- Mike Wead (King Diamond)
- Chris Weber (Hollywood Rose, U.P.O.)
- Michael Weikath (Helloween)
- Carl Weingarten
- Ben Weinman (The Dillinger Escape Plan)
- Scott Weinrich (The Obsessed)
- Brian "Head" Welch (Korn)
- Paul Weller (The Jam, The Style Council)
- Allen West (Obituary)
- Leslie West (Mountain)
- Bob Weston (Fleetwood Mac)
- Emil Werstler (Chimaira, Dååth)
- Alex Westaway (Fightstar)
- Deryck Whibley (Sum 41)
- Andrew White (Kaiser Chiefs)
- Clarence White (The Kentucky Colonels, Nashville West, The Byrds)
- Jack White (The White Stripes, The Raconteurs)
- Jason White (Green Day, Foxboro Hot Tubs)
- Snowy White (Thin Lizzy)
- Brad Whitford (Aerosmith, Whitford/St. Holmes)
- John "Charlie" Whitney (Family, Streetwalkers)
- Peter Wichers (Soilwork)
- Carl Wilson (The Beach Boys)
- Nancy Wilson (Heart)
- Ricky Wilson (The B-52's)
- Steven Wilson (Porcupine Tree)
- Michael Wilton (Queensrÿche)
- Johnny Winter
- Piotr "Peter" Wiwczarek (Vader)
- Ronnie Wood (The Faces, The Rolling Stones)
- Link Wray
- Zakk Wylde (Ozzy Osbourne, Black Label Society)

== Y ==
- Jim Yester (The Association)
- Sami Yli-Sirniö (Kreator)
- Angus Young (AC/DC)
- James Young (Styx)
- Jeff Young (Megadeth)
- Neil Young (Buffalo Springfield, Crosby, Stills, Nash & Young)
- Thomas Youngblood (Kamelot)

== Z ==
- Dweezil Zappa
- Frank Zappa
- John Zwetsloot (The Haunted)
