= Ince =

Ince may refer to:

== Places ==
- Ince, Cheshire, England
  - Ince & Elton railway station
- Ince-in-Makerfield, Wigan, England
  - Ince railway station
  - Ince (UK Parliament constituency)
  - Ince and Scholes (ward)
- Ince Blundell, formerly Ince, Merseyside, England
- İncə, Goychay, Azerbaijan
- İncə, Shaki, Azerbaijan

== Other uses ==
- Ince (surname), including a list of people with the name
- Ince & Co, former international law firm

== See also ==
- Ince Castle, a manor house in Cornwall, England
- Ince and Mayhew, partnership of furnituremakers 1759–1803
