= Thomas Beighton =

Thomas Beighton (25 December 1790 – 14 April 1844) was an English Protestant Christian missionary who served with the London Missionary Society to the Chinese people of Malaysia in the early nineteenth century.

Beighton was born in Ednaston, Derbyshire, England. In 1821 Beighton and fellow missionary, John Ince toured the coast of Queda on the Malay Peninsula, first visiting Queda Muda, so that they could distribute copies of the Bible in Chinese as well as Gospel tracts while engaging in personal evangelism. At Pulu Tega, they had an interview with the Rajah, who gave them permission to visit Queda.

Beighton died in Penang, Malaysia after 25 years of missionary work and was buried in the Protestant Cemetery in Penang.
