= Kaan Akça =

German footballer

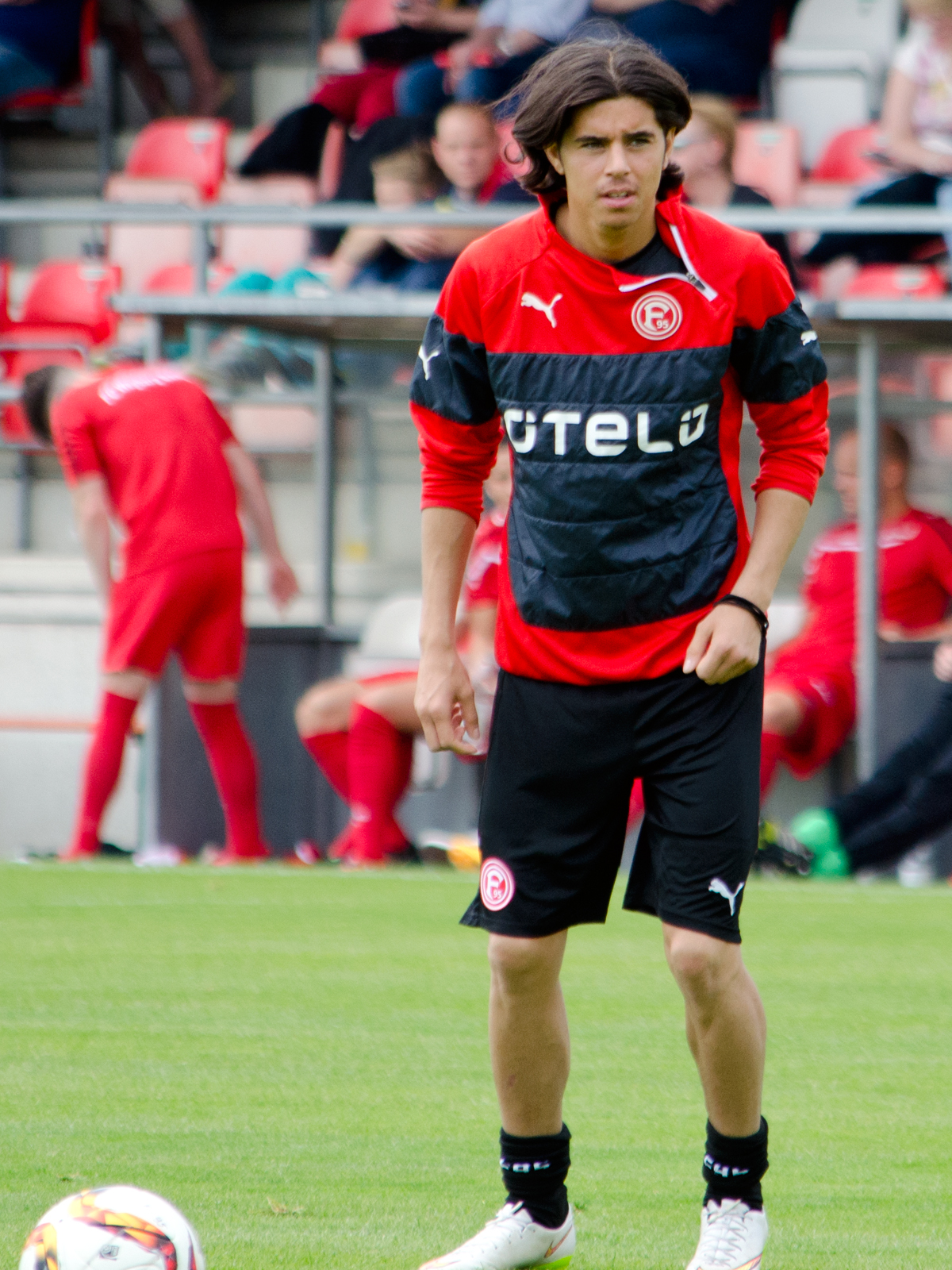

Personal information
- Date of birth: 21 February 1994 (age 32)
- Place of birth: Cologne, Germany
- Height: 1.78 m (5 ft 10 in)
- Position: Midfielder

Team information
- Current team: FC Pesch
- Number: 10

Youth career
- CfB Ford Köln-Niehl
- –2007: Bayer Leverkusen
- 2007–2008: Chelsea
- 2008–2013: Fortuna Düsseldorf

Senior career*
| Years | Team | Apps | (Gls) |
| 2013–2018 | Fortuna Düsseldorf II | 74 | (3) |
| 2015–2016 | Fortuna Düsseldorf | 1 | (0) |
| 2018–2019 | FSV Duisburg | 9 | (1) |
| 2019–2020 | SG Köln-Worringen | | |
| 2020– | FC Pesch | 68 | (10) |
- * Club domestic league appearances and goals as of 03:57, 4 July 2024 (UTC)

Kaan Akça (born 21 February 1994) is a German footballer who plays as a midfielder for the Mittelrheinliga club FC Pesch.
