= Caan (Dutch family) =

Dutch patrician family

- family
- Country: Netherlands
- Founded: 17th century
- Founder: Heynderick Thielemans

Caan (als: Caan van Neck and De la Bassecour Caan) was the name of a Dutch patrician family.

== History ==
The oldest known family member Heynderick Thielemans (Caen), a baker in Delfshaven who died in 1644.

== Bibliography ==
- Nederland's Patriciaat 16 (1926), p. 37-45.
