= Redouane Aouameur =

Algerian metal musician (born 1976)

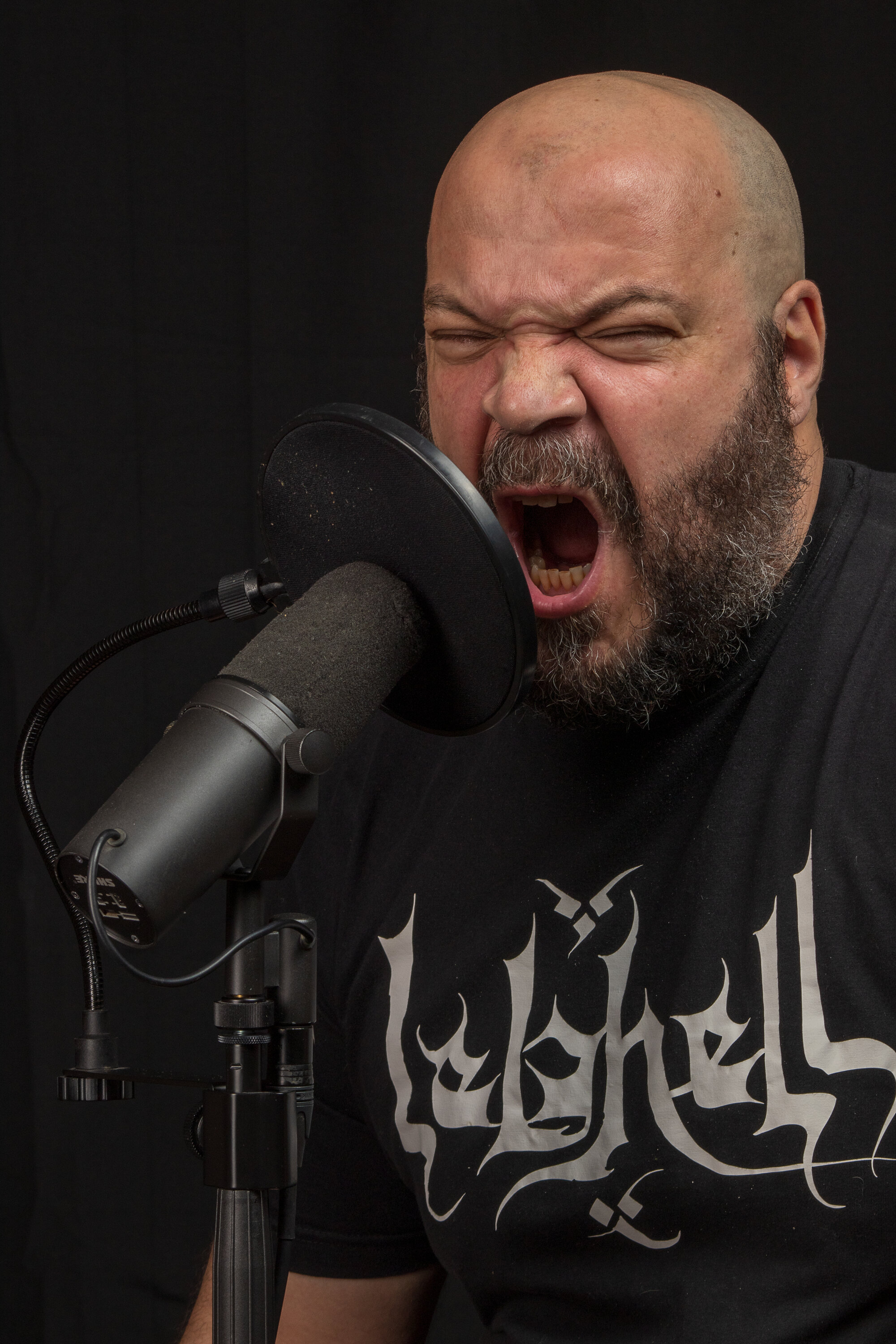
- Aouameur in 2022

Background information
- Born: 27 November 1976 (age 49); Algiers
- Genres: Death Metal; Black Metal; Grindcore
- Occupations: Vocalist, guitarist, studio session vocalist, vocal coach, mix engineer
- Instruments: Vocals, Guitar, Bass
- Years active: 1993–present
- Website: www.redouaneaouameur.com

Redouane Aouameur (Arabic: رضوان عوامر; born 27 November 1976 in Algiers) is an Algerian metal musician and the lead singer and guitarist of the Algerian metal band Lelahell.

== Career ==
In the course of over two decades, Aouameur influenced as Algerians emerging metal music scene.

He appeared the first time as a bassist of Algeria's first ever extreme metal act "Neanderthalia" in the late 90s and has gone on to pioneer the first Algerian metal album with the band "Litham". In 2004 he formed "Carnavage", the first Algerian grindcore band.

Today, Aouameur is known as the front man for "Lelahell".

In January 2016, a 52 minutes documentary entitled "Highway to Lelahell" was published. It traces the career of Aouameur, enriched for 23 years, which blends with the history of Metal in Algeria.

== Lelahell's line-up ==
Redouane Aouameur – Guitar and Vocals

Lemir Siam – Drums

Ramzi Abbas – Bass

== Discography ==
=== Neanderthalia ===
- Rage by Hate (1996)

=== Litham ===
- Dhal Ennar (The first Algerian metal album) (1999)
- Promo 2002 (Demo) (2002)
- Promo 2006 (Demo) (2006)

=== Carnavage ===
- Carnival of Carnage (Demo) (2005)
- The Hairless Fat Carnage Deed (EP) (2007)

=== Devast ===
- Art of Extermination (2008)

=== Lelahell ===
- Al Intihar (EP) (2012)
- Al Insane... The (Re)birth of Abderrahmane (2014)
- Alif (2018)

=== Metal Against Coronavirus ===
- The First Line (Single) (2021)
