= Kaan Korad =

- Genres: Classical
- Instrument: Classical guitar

Kaan Korad is a Turkish classical guitarist.

== Biography ==
He studied guitar with the Turkish Guitarist Ahmet Kanneci at the Department of Guitar, at Hacettepe University State Conservatory. Later, he became a student of Ireneuzs Strachocki at the University of Bilkent in Ankara, Turkey.

He was a member of Bilkent Guitar Trio. Currently he performs in a duo ensemble with the guitarist Kürşad Terci.

== See also ==
- List of lead guitarists
- Music of Turkey
