= Kaan İşbilen =

Turkish basketball player (born 1983)

Personal information
- Born: 15 January 1983 (age 43) Buca, Turkey
- Listed height: 2.06 m (6 ft 9 in)

Career information
- NBA draft: 2005: undrafted
- Playing career: 2001–2012
- Position: Center

Career history
- 2001–2005: Pınar Karşıyaka
- 2004–2005: → Samsunspor
- 2005–2006: Vestelspor
- 2007–2008: İzmir Büyükşehir Belediyesi
- 2008–2009: Bursaspor
- 2009: Ormanspor
- 2009–2010: Pamukkale Üniversitesi
- 2010–2011: Mutlu Aku Selcuk Universitesi
- 2011–2012: Gelişim Koleji

Kaan İşbilen (born 15 January 1983) is a Turkish Canadian former professional basketball player.

== Career ==
Throughout his career, İşbilen played for Pınar Karşıyaka, Samsunspor, Vestelspor, İzmir Büyükşehir Belediyesi, Bursaspor, Ormanspor, Pamukkale Üniversitesi, Mutlu Aku Selcuk Universitesi, Gelişim Koleji and TED Ankara Kolejliler before retiring in 2012 and embarking on a managerial career.

In June 2016, he was named the new president of Gediz Üniversitesi.
