= John F. Ince =

American film director

- Education: MBA from Harvard Business School major in finance (1973)
- Occupation(s): author business journalist documentary filmmaker social entrepreneur podcaster nonprofit administrator Host & creator of PodVentureZone; Founder/CEO of I-INSPIRE
- Notable work: TIME-BOMB:America's Debt Crises Causes Consequences and Solutions

John F. Ince is an author, business journalist, documentary filmmaker, social entrepreneur, podcaster and nonprofit administrator. He is the host and creator of PodVentureZone, a regular podcast for the Venture Capital and entrepreneurial community and Founder / CEO of I-INSPIRE: An Operating System for the Social Economy.

== Biography ==
Ince received his bachelor's degree in 1970 with honors in history from Harvard University. In 1973 he received his MBA from Harvard Business School, with a major in finance. He began his journalistic career as a reporter with Fortune magazine in New York City and later joined the junior faculty of Harvard Business School. He assisted with Energy Future, a Report of the Harvard Business School Energy Project and worked as a case writer at Harvard's John F. Kennedy School of Government.

Ince was a contributing editor with Upside magazine, writing about B2B, Search Engines, Supply Chain Management, E-Learning, EMS, Venture Capital Investment Banking and portals, as well as early articles on Google in 2000 and 2001.

He is the author of three books and his writings have appeared in The Wall Street Journal, The New York Times, and the San Francisco Chronicle. In 2005, he made a documentary film on the U.S. National Debt titled TIME-BOMB: America's Debt Crises Causes Consequences and Solutions. In April 2006 the film was broadcast on national television, and again aired in August 2006.

Ince was selected as a featured hero by The Emily Fund's Do One Thing program, primarily for his role as the creator of the Earth Pledge Campaign.
