= Kaan İnce =

- Born: February 1, 1970; Ankara, Turkey
- Died: August 13, 1992 (aged 22); Kadıköy, Istanbul, Turkey
- Education: Graduate
- Occupation: Turkish

Kaan İnce (2 February 1970 - 13 August 1992) was a Turkish writer and poet.

== Life ==
İnce was born on 2 February 1970 in Ankara. He completed his elementary, middle and high school education in Ankara. In 1991 he graduated from Ankara University with a degree in sociology. İnce wrote poems, which were published in many magazines. His first poem was published in the daily Milliyet Art Young Poets corner.

Aged 22 years, he committed suicide on August 13, 1992, jumping from the window of his hotel room in Kadıköy, Istanbul.
