= John Ince (missionary) =

British Protestant Christian missionary (1795–1825)

John Ince (20 August 1795 – 24 April 1825) was an early British Protestant Christian missionary to the Chinese at Penang and Malacca with the London Missionary Society.

== Missionary career ==
Ince studied divinity under David Bogue at Gosport. He was ordained along with two other men, Robert Fleming and Mercer, at the Union Chapel, Islington, London on 22 January 1818.

On 17 February, he and his wife, Joanna (née Barr), left England aboard the “General Graham”. They arrived at Malacca (now Malaysia) on 14 September. On 3 October, their daughter, Matilda was born.

At Malacca, Ince studied the Chinese language at the Anglo-Chinese College founded by Robert Morrison and the first principal, William Milne.

In 1819, he took his family to Penang, arriving on 28 June. There he established schools for Chinese children, with the patronage and assistance of the government of the British Straits Settlements.

In 1821, Ince and his fellow missionary, Thomas Beighton toured the coast of Queda on the Malay Peninsula, first visiting Queda Muda (Kuala Muda), so that they could distribute copies of the Bible in Chinese as well as Gospel tracts while engaging in personal evangelism. At Pulu Tega, they had an interview with the Rajah, who gave them permission to visit Queda.

Later in 1821 he took his family to Malacca, on account of their health. The following year, his wife died. She was buried along with her infant son in the Protestant Cemetery at Penang with two of their infant daughters, Caroline Rachel and Eliza, who had died previously. Their daughter, Matilda survived.

A chapel was built in 1824 at Malacca, with generous donations from the inhabitants of the settlement. Ince became ill during the same year and suffered until his death in April of the following year. He was buried in the Protestant Cemetery at Penang alongside his wife.

== Works ==
- “School Book”, Malacca (1824)
