= John Ince (footballer) =

English footballer (1908–1968)

Personal information
- Date of birth: 29 November 1908
- Place of birth: Hirst, Northumberland, England
- Date of death: 1968 (age 59)
- Place of death: Northumberland, England
- Position: Goalkeeper

Senior career*
Years	Team	Apps	(Gls)
- St Peter's Albion
1932–1933	Exeter City	0	(0)
1933–1934	Darlington	29	(0)
1934–1935	Gateshead	22	(0)
- * Club domestic league appearances and goals

Joe Ince (29 November 1908 – 1968) was an English footballer who made 51 appearances in the Football League playing as a goalkeeper for Darlington and Gateshead in the 1930s. He was also on the books of Exeter City without representing them in the League.
