= John E. Ince Jr. =

American actor (1878–1947)

John Ince
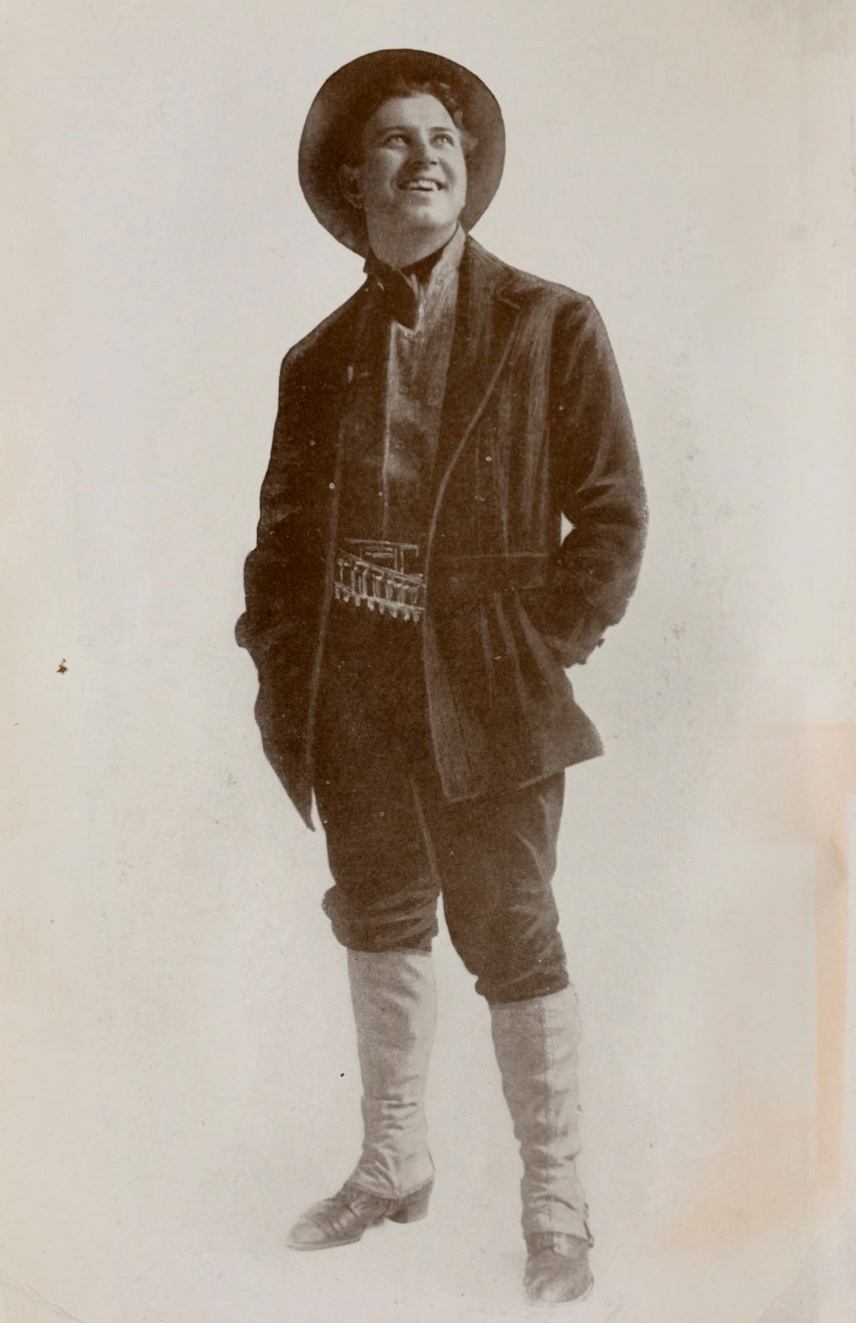
- John Ince in 1914
- Born: John Edward Ince, Jr. August 29, 1878; New York City, U.S.
- Died: April 10, 1947 (aged 68); Hollywood, Los Angeles, California, U.S.
- Occupations: Film director, actor
- Years active: 1913–1945
- Relatives: John E. Ince, Sr. (father); Thomas H. Ince (brother); Ralph Ince (brother)

John Edward Ince Jr. (August 29, 1878 – April 10, 1947), known professionally as John Ince or John E. Ince, was an American actor of stage and motion pictures, and a film director. He should not be confused with his father, the actor John E. Ince, Sr., who also had a career on the stage as John E. Ince. He was the elder brother of Thomas H. Ince, and Ralph Ince.

== Biography ==
The son of actor John Edward Ince Sr., John Edward Ince, Jr. was born on August 29, 1878, in New York City. In 1895 he joined the stock theatre company at the Grand Opera House in Boston.

In 1910, he was a member of a stock theatre at the Alcazar Theatre in San Francisco, California, where he worked alongside actor Howard Hickman. Ince became a member of The Lambs Club in New York City in 1919 like his brother Ralph, who had joined in 1916.

A leading man from the early 1910s, he also directed and scripted several of his own vehicles. Concentrating almost exclusively on directing from 1915 through 1928, Ince returned before the cameras as a character actor in the early years of the talkies.

== Selected filmography ==
- The Battle of Shiloh (1913) - Frank Carey
- His Brother Bill (1914)
- The Cowardly Way (1915, director)
- The Planter (1917, co-director)
- Secret Strings (1918, director)
- A Favor To A Friend (1919)
- Blind Man's Eyes (1919, director)
- Blackie's Redemption (1919, director)
- One-Thing-at-a-Time O'Day (1919, director)
- Old Lady 31 (1920, director)
- Held In Trust (1920, director)
- Passion Fruit (1921)
- The Hole in the Wall (1921)
- The Love Trap (1923, director)
- The Girl of Gold (1925, director)
- The Great Jewel Robbery (1925, director)
- Her Big Adventure (1926, director)
- Hour of Reckoning (1927)
- Wages of Conscience (1927)
- Hot Curves (1930)
- Air Eagles (1931)
- Is There Justice? (1931)
- Wild West Whoopee (1931)
- Headin' for Trouble (1931)
- Sheer Luck (1931)
- Guns for Hire (1932)
- Temptation's Workshop (1932)
- Passport to Paradise (1932)
- Exposed (1932)
- Human Targets (1932)
- No Living Witness (1932)
- The Thrill Hunter (1933)
- Alimony Madness (1933)
- Ship of Wanted Men (1933)
- Behind the Green Lights (1935)
- Million Dollar Haul (1935)
- Lawless Range (1935)
- Circus Shadows (1935)
- In Old Kentucky (1935)
- Modern Times (1936) - warden
- The Speed Reporter (1936)
- Night Cargo (1936)
- Way Out West (1937)
- Special Agent K-7 (1937)
- Squadron of Honor (1938)
- Mr. Celebrity (1941)
- Code of the Outlaw (1942)
- Wilson (1944) - Senator Watson
- Girls of the Big House (1945)
