= John E. Ince Sr. =

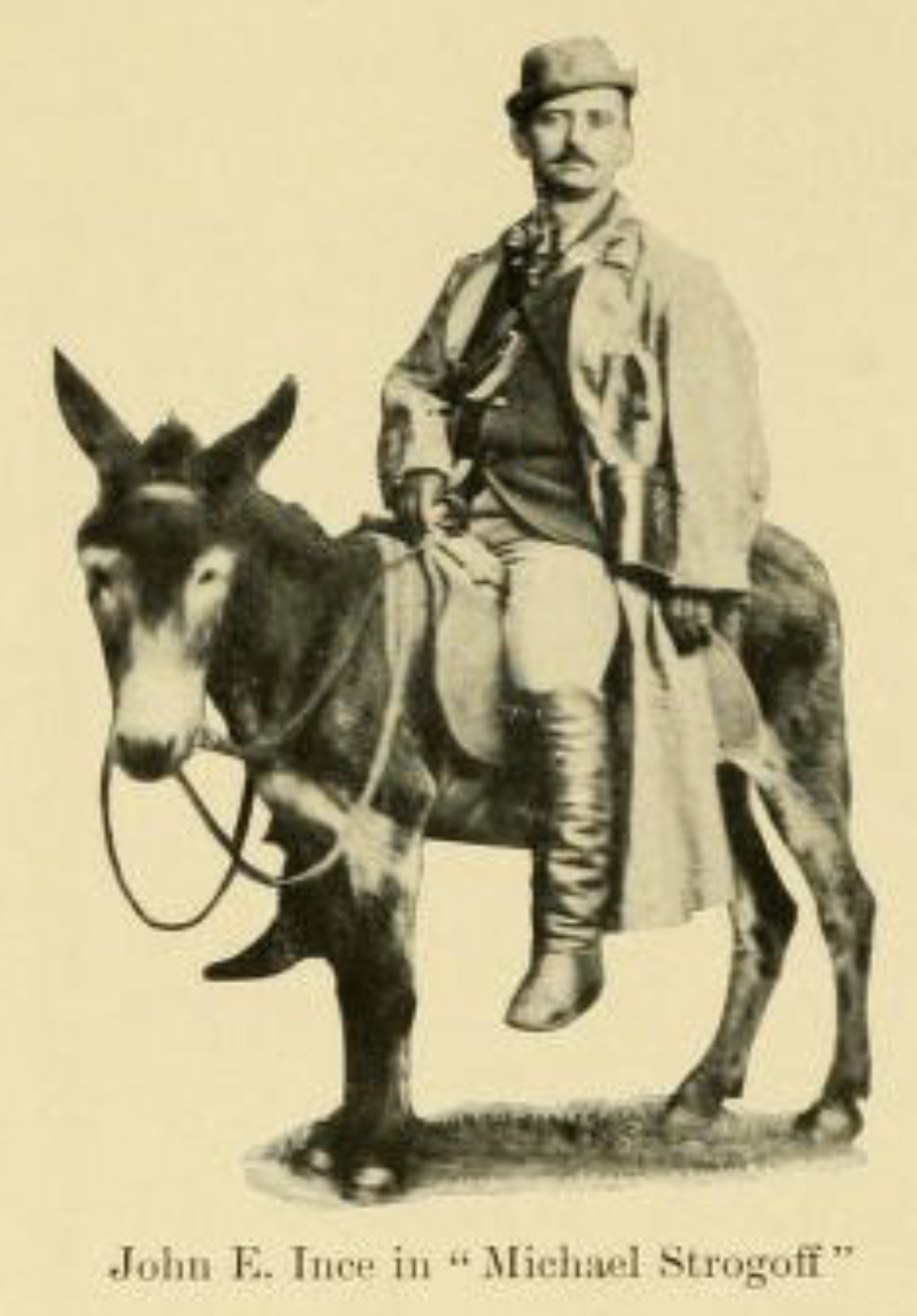
John E. Ince in the 1881 production of Michael Strogoff.

John Edward Ince Sr., known on the stage as John E. Ince, (1841 – January 18, 1909), was an English-born American actor active on the stage from the 1870s until his retirement in 1907. He starred in touring productions, stock theatre, regional theatre, vaudeville entertainments, and Broadway shows; often in comic character roles. He was the head of the Ince family of actors.

A native of Wigan, England, Ince served in the Royal Navy prior to immigrating to the United States where he settled in California. There he was educated at St. Ignatius College and worked as a miner and journalist prior to his career on the stage. He married the comic opera actress Emma Brennan with whom he occasionally performed. He should not be confused with his son, the actor and film maker John E. Ince Jr. who was also known on the stage as John E. Ince. He was also the father of actors and film makers Thomas H. Ince and Ralph Ince. He would occasionally perform with his wife and children.

== Early life, education, and family ==
John Edward Ince was born in Wigan, England in 1841. He served in the Royal Navy as a "powder monkey" before immigrating to the United States where he settled in California. He was educated at the University of San Francisco (then St. Ignatius College). Prior to his career as an actor he worked as a miner and a journalist.

Ince married the comic opera actress Emma Brennan (also known as Emma Jones) with whom he had three sons who all followed their parents into acting careers and later became film makers. John Edward Ince Jr. was born on August 29, 1878, in New York City. After this the family settled in Newport, Rhode Island where Thomas H. Ince was born on November 16, 1880. The family also spent time living in Boston where Ralph Ince was born on January 16, 1887.

John E. Ince Sr. lived a nomadic existence, frequently traveling for acting work. His wife and children occasionally joined him on the road and in performance in vaudeville, and other times they remained at a farm owned by Emma Ince in New Hampshire. The children would also sometimes be left at a farm in Nova Scotia to be cared for by friends of their parents while they were on the road performing.

== 19th century career ==
Ince had a successful career on the American stage in the 19th century and early 20th century, performing in plays with Edwin Booth, Lawrence Barrett, John Henry McCullough, Adelaide Neilson, Clara Morris, and Mrs. John Drew. On the stage he gained the nickname "Pop Ince". He played many leading roles in the plays of William Shakespeare, and also performed leading parts in Gilbert and Sullivan comic operas like H. M. S. Pinafore, The Pirates of Penzance, Trial by Jury, and The Mikado. He also performed lead parts in classic plays like The School for Scandal and London Assurance.

In the 1879–1880 season Ince toured with Minnie Palmer's theatre troupe in the show Boarding School. In 1881 he portrayed the Innkeeper in Adolphe d'Ennery and Jules Verne's Michael Strogoff at Booth's Theatre on Broadway. In 1883 he starred in the premiere of Leander Richardson's Expiation at the Brooklyn Park Theatre. In 1884 he performed at Broadway's Fifth Avenue Theatre in Well Fed Dora. In 1886 he portrayed Wing Lee in My Partner at the Windsor Theatre (WT). He returned to the WT in 1889 in Wilton Payne's The Way of the World. He was also engaged at the Fifth Avenue Theatre in 1889 in The Love Story.

In 1890 Ince performed at the Grand Opera House in Manhattan in A Gold Mine, and in Webster Edgerly's Christopher Columbus in a return to the WT. He toured in 1890–1891 season in the play Paul Kauvar. In 1892 he performed as Wouter Van Twiller in Henry Guy Carleton's Ye Earlie Trouble at Proctor's Theatre. In 1893 he portrayed Sergeant Casey in Margaret Bradford Smith's Captain Herne, U.S.A. at the Union Square Theatre. In 1894 he performed at Broadway's Bijou Theatre as Brooks in Carleton's Lem Kettle.

In 1896 Ince portrayed Judge Theodore Mott in McKee Rankin's True To Life at Broadway's Murray Hill Theatre. In October 1898 he replaced actor R. A. Roberts Sergeant Dan Doxey in the Broadway production of Cecil Raleigh and Seymour Hicks's Sporting Life. In 1899 he portrayed Theodore Vane in Anita Vivanti Chartres's That Man at the Herald Square Theatre.

== 20th century career and death ==
By 1901 Ince had established a dramatic school in New York City at 1439 Broadway where he prepared pupils for both legitimate theatre and vaudeville. In 1906 he portrayed the old law clerk Cushman in Sydney Rosenfeld's The Optimist at Daly's Theatre.His last appearance on the stage were in 1907 at Proctor's 58th Street Theatre in the shows Pudd'nhead Wilson and The Unexpected Happened. Pudd'nhead Wilson was a stage adaptation of Mark Twain's novel by Frank Mayo which he had previously performed in at Broadway's Herald Square Theatre in 1895 (as the character Swan). The Unexpected Happened was a vaudeville show created by Tom Ince for his parents.

Ince died at his home in Sheepshead Bay, Brooklyn on January 18, 1909.
