= Clive Painter =

English musician and record producer

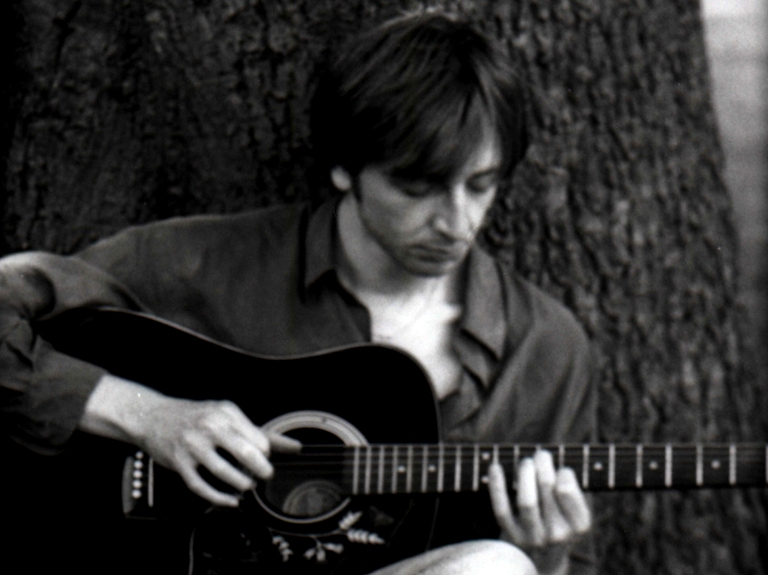

Background information
- Origin: London, England
- Genres: Experimental rock, ambient, electronic, art rock, indie rock, post rock.
- Occupations: Producer, musician, cinematographer, mastering engineer
- Instruments: Guitar, bass, drums, keyboards,
- Years active: 1992–present
- Labels: Big Cat Records, Kitty Kitty, Piao!, Tongue Master, PIAS Recordings, British Film Institute, Snowstorm, Cherry Red Records
- Member of: The 99 Call, Broken Dog, The Real Tuesday Weld, Monograph
- Formerly of: Tram, Isadora Beech

Clive Painter is an English musician, record producer and mastering engineer based in London.

Since the mid-1990s, Painter has been known primarily as the producer and multi-instrumentalist in both Broken Dog and Tram, and he is currently active as a guitarist in The 99 Call and The Real Tuesday Weld. In 2001, he released an instrumental album Rocket Science on the Showstorm label under the name of Wolf. Described in the press as similar in style to an Ennio Morricone score and compared to Sigur Rós and Godspeed You Black Emperor.

== History ==
The first commercial release featuring Clive Painter was a 12" single called "Falling" by a duo he formed in 1990 with Joanne Taylor called Isadora Beech. The single was released in 1991 on the Cherry Red subsidiary label MFF.

In 1994 Clive Painter formed the cult band Broken Dog with Martine Roberts and the following year they were signed to Big Cat Records and released their first album in 1996. John Peel became a fan of Broken Dog and over the next eight years they were invited by him to record four peel sessions and made numerous other appearances on his Radio 1 show. Broken Dog have released five albums and a handful of singles/EPs.

In 1997 Clive Painter began working on the production of the first Tram singles and their debut album Heavy Black Frame. On which he played guitar, bass, harmonium, percussion and clarinet. He co-produced the album with the guitarist and singer Paul Anderson and played live with Tram until 1999. He also appears on Tram's first session for John Peel recorded in 1998. In 2009 Clive Painter and Paul Anderson formed a new band called The 99 Call.

At the same time as working on Heavy Black Frame Clive Painter was working on recordings by Monograph which were released on Shinkansen Recordings. He also produced several singles for the London-based Piao! Label by artists such as Girlfrendo and Miss Mend.

Since 2003 he has been a member of The Real Tuesday Weld live band having previously been associated with the group as a Mastering Engineer and occasional Producer/Collaborator. He appears as a Guitarist on a few albums by the group but most notably Co-Produced the 2005 re-scoring of Hans Richter's 1947 surrealist film Dreams That Money Can Buy for DVD release through the British Film Institute on which he is also credited with Composition and Performance. Live soundtrack performances of this film have taken place at the BFI Southbank, The Tate Modern, The Moscow Film Festival and The Belfast Film Festival.

Clive Painter has been credited as a Mastering Engineer for numerous independent record labels since 1999 and as such has worked with a variety of artists such as Part Chimp, Chris TT, Ivor Cutler and Comes with a Smile magazine.

In 2005 Clive Painter began producing radio shows for Resonance FM, an arts based radio station in London. The first of these was a programme called Home is Other People. Followed in 2008 by a programme called Tock Tick. He is also more recently known as a Film Maker, Cinematographer and Film Editor.

== Discography ==
Performance Credits

- Isadora Beech – Falling (Richmond records) (1993)
- Broken Dog – Broken Dog (Big Cat Records) (1996)
- Broken Dog – Throw Everything Away (Big Cat Records) (1996)
- Tram – Nothing Left To Say (Piao!) (1997)
- Broken Dog – Past, Present, Future (Big Cat Records) (1997)
- Broken Dog – Trails (Big Cat Records) (1997)
- Broken Dog – Safety in Numbers (Big Cat Records) (1998)
- Broken Dog – Zero (Big Cat Records) (1998)
- Monograph – Don't Gimme Shelter (Shinkansen Recordings) (1999)
- Tram – Heavy Black Frame (Piao!) (1999)
- Monograph – Lorelei (Shinkansen Recordings) (1999)
- Broken Dog – Your Name – Pearl Necklace (Dishy Recordings) (1999)
- Tram – Underneath The Ceiling – Pearl Necklace (Dishy Recordings) (1999)
- Monograph – Please Don't Be Afraid of Anything (Shinkansen Recordings) (1999)
- Broken Dog – Sleeve With Hearts (Piao!) (1999)
- Tram – Songs From The Sturdy Chariot (Liquefaction Empire) (1999)
- Broken Dog – They Were Real (Big Cat Records) (1999)
- Jamie Owen – Graffiti Truck (Dreamy Records) (1999)
- Tram – Underneath The Ceiling (Setanta Records) (2000)
- Broken Dog – Anchor (Kitty Kitty Corporation) (2001)
- Broken Dog – Brighter Now (Kitty Kitty Corporation) (2001)
- Stef Giaccone – Cosi' Che Va / Tsoai-Talee (Jonson Family) (2001)
- Broken Dog – Big Black Car – Homesleep Cover Songs (Homesleep) (2001)
- Wolf – Rocket Science (Snowstorm) (2001)
- Broken Dog – Radios (Tongue Master) (2002)
- Pacific Radio – Pacific Radio (Shinkansen Records) (2003)
- Broken Dog – Harmonia (Tongue Master) (2004)
- The Real Tuesday Weld – The Return of the Clerkenwell Kid (Six Degrees Records) (2005)
- The Real Tuesday Weld – Dreams That Money Can Buy (British Film Institute) (2006)
- The Real Tuesday Weld – The London Book of the Dead (Six Degrees Records) (2007)
- The Real Tuesday Weld – Seasons Dreamings (Antique Beat) (2008)

Production/Mix Credits

- Broken Dog – Broken Dog (Big Cat Records) (1996)
- Broken Dog – Throw Everything Away (Big Cat Records) (1996)
- Girlfrendo – Friday Night Lovebite (Piao!) (1997)
- Girlfrendo – Heartbreakers (Piao!) (1997)
- Tram – Nothing Left To Say (Piao!) (1997)
- Broken Dog – Trails (Big Cat Records) (1997)
- Broken Dog – Safety in Numbers (Big Cat Records) (1998)
- Broken Dog – Zero (Big Cat Records) (1998)
- Monograph – Don't Gimme Shelter (Shinkansen Recordings) (1999)
- Tram – Heavy Black Frame (Piao!) (1999)
- Miss Mend – Living City Plan (Piao!) (1999)
- Monograph – Lorelei (Shinkansen Recordings) (1999)
- Broken Dog – Your Name – Pearl Necklace (Dishy Recordings) (1999)
- Tram – Underneath The Ceiling – Pearl Necklace (Dishy Recordings) (1999)
- Monograph – Please Don't Be Afraid of Anything (Shinkansen Recordings) (1999)
- Miss Mend – Macrometric (Piao!) (1999)
- Broken Dog – Sleeve With Hearts (Piao!) (1999)
- Tram – Songs From The Sturdy Chariot (Liquefaction Empire) (1999)
- Broken Dog – They Were Real (Big Cat Records) (1999)
- Jamie Owen – Graffiti Truck (Dreamy Records) (1999)
- Tram – Underneath The Ceiling (Setanta Records) (2000)
- Broken Dog – Anchor (Kitty Kitty Corporation) (2001)
- Broken Dog – Brighter Now (Kitty Kitty Corporation) (2001)
- Stef Giaccone – Cosi' Che Va / Tsoai-Talee (Jonson Family) (2001)
- Broken Dog – Big Black Car – Homesleep Cover Songs (Homesleep) (2001)
- The Real Tuesday Weld – The Meteorology of Love (Bambini) (2001)
- Wolf – Rocket Science (Snowstorm) (2001)
- The Real Tuesday Weld – The Birds and the Bees/Where Psyche Meets Cupid (Kindercore Records) (2001)
- Broken Dog – Radios (Tongue Master) (2002)
- Pacific Radio – Pacific Radio (Shinkansen Recordings) (2003)
- Broken Dog – Harmonia (Tongue Master) (2004)
- The Real Tuesday Weld – Dreams That Money Can Buy (British Film Institute) (2006)
- The Real Tuesday Weld – Seasons Dreamings (Antique Beat) (2008)

== Mastering credits ==
- Head in the Clouds (Dreamy Records Compilation) (1999)
- Pearl Necklace (Dishy Records Compilation) (1999)
- The Real Tuesday Weld – L'amour Et La Morte (Dreamy Records) (2000)
- The Real Tuesday Weld – The Valentine EP (Dreamy Records) (2000)
- Chris TT – Panic Attack at Sainsbury's (Snowstorm) (2000)
- A Wish on a Star (Dreamy Records Compilation) (2001)
- The Real Tuesday Weld – I Love The Rain (Dreamy Records) (2001)
- The Real Tuesday Weld – Am I in Love? (Motorway Records) (2001)
- Chris TT – The 253 (Snowstorm Records) (2001)
- The Real Tuesday Weld – At The House of the Clerkenwell Kid (Bambini) (2001)
- The Real Tuesday Weld – Where Psyche Meets Cupid (Kindercore Records) (2001)
- Part Chimp – Album (Rock Action Records) (2002)
- Jason McNiff – Off The Rails (Snowstorm) (2002)
- The Real Tuesday Weld – I, Lucifer, PIAS Recordings) (2002). Soundtrack/companion to the novel I, Lucifer by Glen Duncan.
- The Broken Family Band – The King Will Build A Disco (Snowstorm) (2002)
- Chris TT – London Is Sinking (Snowstorm) (2003)
- Part Chimp – Bring Back The Sound (Rock Action Records) (2004)
- the Real Tuesday Weld – Les Aperitifs Et Digestifs (Dreamy Records) (2004)
- Comes with a Smile Vol. 9 – Protect Our Secret Handshake (magazine cover CD) (2004)
- Comes with a Smile Vol. 10 – Wide Awake, Crescent-Shaped (magazine cover CD) (2004)
- Comes with a Smile Vol. 11 – Hope Isn't A Word (magazine cover CD) (2004)
- Comes with a Smile Vol. 12 – Meanwhile, In The Meantime (magazine cover CD) (2004)
- Comes with a Smile Vol. 13 – Every Minute A Mystery (magazine cover CD) (2005)
- Comes with a Smile Vol. 14 – Words Worn Down To Nothing (magazine cover CD) (2005)
- Comes with a Smile Vol. 15 – Gloved Hands in a Squeeze (magazine cover CD) (2005)
- Part Chimp – I Am Come (Rock Action Records) (2005)
- Part Chimp – New Cross (Rock Action Records) (2005)
- Part Chimp – War Machine (Rock Action Records) (2005)
- Comes with a Smile Vol. 16 – How They Wash Away (magazine cover CD) (2006)
- Monotreme Records Sampler (Monotreme Records Compilation) (2006)
- Pre – Epic Fits (Skin Graft Records) (2007)
- Ivor Cutler – Privilege (Hoorgi House) (2009)
