= Godson (disambiguation) =

A godson is a male godchild.

Godson or The Godson may also refer to:

- Godson (surname)
- The Godson (film), a 1998 American comedy film
- "The Godson" (short story), a story by Leo Tolstoy
- Le Samouraï, a 1967 French crime film released as The Godson in English
- The Godson, a 1971 Mafia/sexploitation film
- Loongson, a brand of CPU chips

== See also ==
- Goodson (disambiguation)
