= I, Lucifer =

I, Lucifer may refer to:

- I, Lucifer (O'Donnell novel), an action-adventure novel by Peter O'Donnell
- I, Lucifer (Duncan novel), a 2003 supernatural-fiction novel by Glen Duncan
- I, Lucifer (Destroy the Runner album)
- I, Lucifer (Real Tuesday Weld album)

== See also ==
- I Luciferi, an album by Danzig
