= Monograph (disambiguation) =

A monograph is a specialist work of writing on a single subject or an aspect of a subject.

It may also refer to:

- Monograph (band), a musical group
- Monograph (orthography), a grapheme
