= They Shoot Horses, Don't They? =

They Shoot Horses, Don't They? may refer to:

- They Shoot Horses, Don't They? (novel), a novel by Horace McCoy
- They Shoot Horses, Don't They? (film), a 1969 film adapted from the novel
- They Shoot Horses, Don't They? (band), a Canadian rock band
- "They Shoot Horses, Don't They?", a song by Racing Cars
- "They Shoot Horse, Don't They?", a song by Quickspace from the 2000 album The Death of Quickspace
