= The 99 Call =

British band

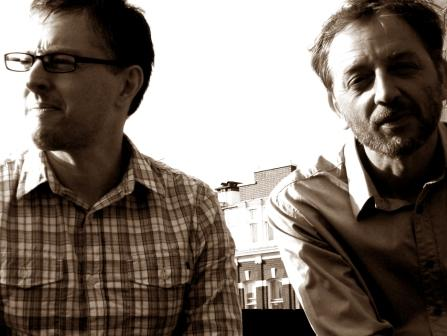

Background information
- Origin: London, England, UK
- Genres: Experimental rock Indie rock
- Years active: 2009 to present
- Members: Paul Anderson; Clive Painter
- Website: http://www.the99call.net

The 99 Call are a British band formed in 2009 by Paul Anderson, previously from Tram and Clive Painter from Broken Dog. They performed their first show in Rimini, Italy in July 2009 playing some new material and songs from the Tram album Heavy Black Frame in celebration of its tenth anniversary. The 99 Call have recorded soundtracks for several short films. They subsequently released their first single called 'Last Days' on Setanta Records in 2010. Followed by a mini album called 'Spanish Flies' on Moonpalace Records which featured Martin Medina on piano and trumpet.

== Members ==
- Paul Anderson
- Clive Painter
