= The London Book of the Dead =

Studio album by The Real Tuesday Weld
- Released: 2007
- Genre: Indie pop Lounge music Electro swing Music hall Dark cabaret
- Length: 48:58
- Label: Six Degrees Records / Antique Beat

The Real Tuesday Weld chronology
Dreams That Money Can Buy	The London Book of the Dead (2007)	At the End of the World (2008)

The London Book of the Dead is the seventh album by British band The Real Tuesday Weld.

== Track listing ==
1. "Blood Sugar Love" – 3:15
2. "The Decline and Fall of the Clerkenwell Kid" – 3:00
3. "It's a Wonderful Li(f)e" – 3:10
4. "Cloud Cuckooland" – 3:15
5. "Kix" – 3:03
6. "Love Sugar Blood" – 1:08
7. "I Loved London" – 3:07
8. "I Believe" – 3:45
9. "Song for William" – 1:06
10. "Waltz for One" – 1:54
11. "Ruth, Roses and Revolvers" – 3:51
12. "Dorothy Parker Blue" – 4:53
13. "Last Words" – 4:54
14. "Into the Trees" – 1:20
15. "Bringing the Body Back Home" – 5:49
16. "Apart" – 1:28
