= Courtoy =

Courtoy is a surname. Notable people with the surname include:

- Hannah Courtoy (1784–1849), London society woman
- Lambert Courtoys (c.1520–after 1583), French composer, trombonist, and singer
