= Rocket science =

Rocket science is a colloquial term for aerospace engineering, astronautics and orbital mechanics in the context of rockets and their design.

It may also include the chemistry and engineering behind rockets.

In popular terminology, an endeavor mistakenly assumed to be complicated or difficult can be characterized as not being rocket science in a sarcastic litotes.

It may also refer to:

== Business ==
- Rocket Science Games, a video game development company
- Rocket Science (film production company), a UK film production company

== Entertainment ==
- Rocket Science (miniseries), a 2002 documentary series
- Rocket Science (film), a 2007 comedy-drama film
- Rocket Science (TV series), a 2009 BBC television series
- It Is Rocket Science, a 2011–14 BBC Radio 4 series
- It's Not Rocket Science, a British television show that aired on ITV in 2016

== Music ==
- Rocket Science (band), an Australian alternative rock band
- Rocket Science (Apoptygma Berzerk album), 2009
- Rocket Science (Hugh Blumenfeld album), by folk artist Hugh Blumenfeld
- Rocket Science (Tribal Tech album), by the jazz fusion band Tribal Tech
- Rocket Science (Béla Fleck and the Flecktones album), 2011
- Rocket Science (Wolf album), 2001
- Rocket Science (Rocket Science album), 2013
- Rocket Science (Rick Springfield album), 2016
- "Not Rocket Science" (song), a six-song music album released by Be Your Own Pet in 2007
- "Rocket Science", a song by Swedish group Icona Pop on the Spotify release of the album Icona Pop
