= Godson (surname) =

Godson is a surname. Notable people with the surname include:

- Dean Godson, British journalist
- Francis Godson (1864-1953), Methodist minister in Barbados
- John Godson (born 1970), Polish parliamentarian
- Richard Godson (1797–1849), member of Parliament for Kidderminster, England
- Roy Godson (born 1942), international politics scholar
- William Godson (1766-1822), English attorney
