= Rocket Science (Wolf album) =

Studio album by Wolf Clive Painter
- Released: 2001
- Recorded: Animal Studios
- Genre: Experimental rock
- Label: Snowstorm
- Producer: Clive Painter

Rocket Science is an album by guitarist Clive Painter who is perhaps best known for Broken Dog, the band he formed with Martine Roberts in the mid 1990s. Wolf is his instrumental alias and has been described as similar in mood to Morricone, Calexico, Giant Sand, Brian Eno and Steve Reich. The instrumentation on Rocket Science is complemented with steam train bells and theremins.

== Track listing ==
1. "Ignition"
2. "General View Of The World"
3. "Bluebird"
4. "Black Sky"
5. "Minor Axis"
6. "Rocket Science"
7. "K 66"
8. "Driven Away"
9. "Alpha"
10. "Out There, Somewhere"
