= Broken Dog =

English experimental rock band

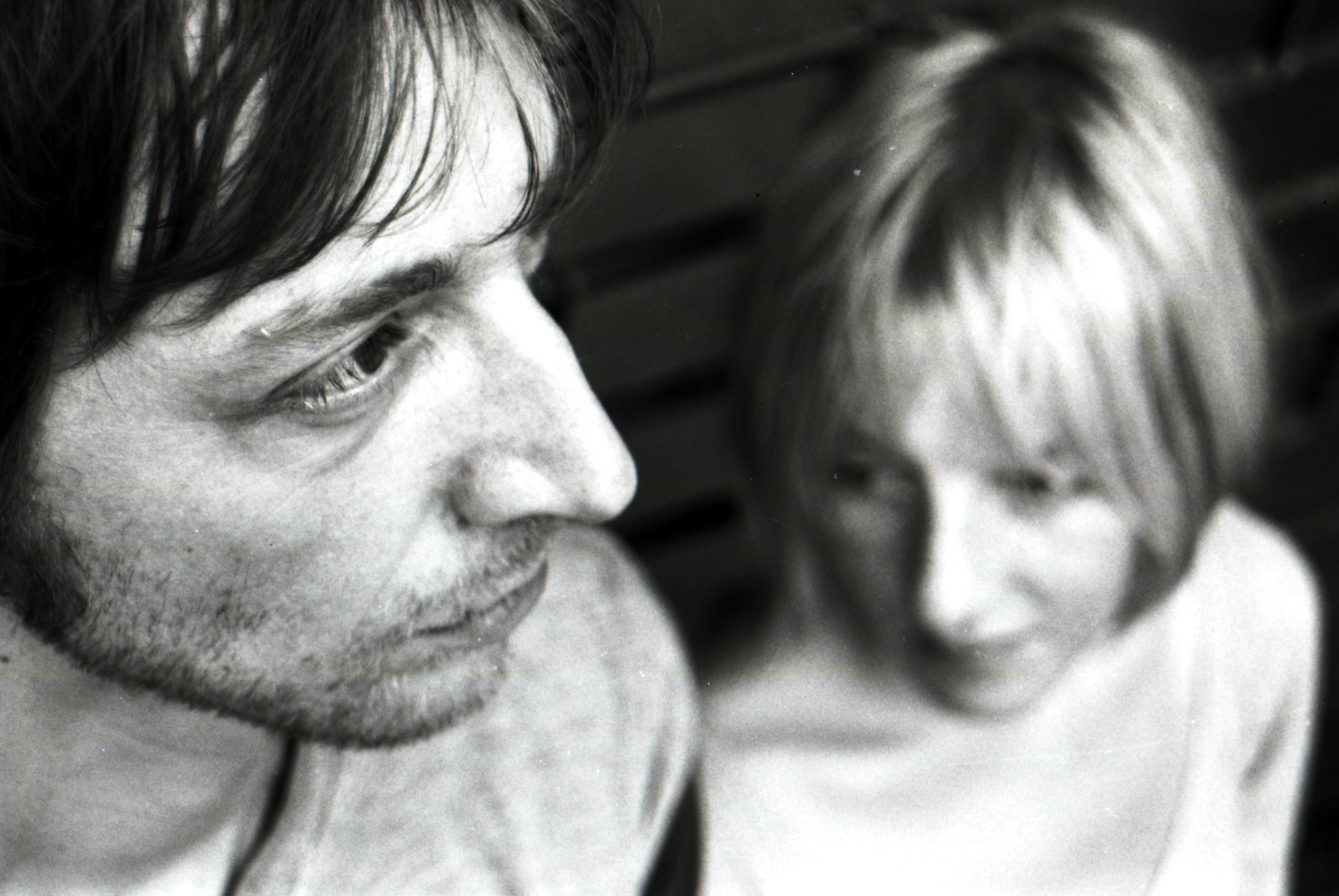

Background information
- Origin: London, England, UK
- Genres: Experimental rock Noise pop Space rock Indie rock
- Years active: 1994 to Present
- Labels: Big Cat Records, Kitty Kitty, Piao!, Tongue Master,
- Members: Martine Roberts; Clive Painter

Broken Dog are an English, London-based experimental rock band, started in 1994.

Broken Dog were formed by Martine Roberts and Clive Painter in London in the summer of 1994 and disbanded in 2004 following their fifth album Harmonia. Influenced by American artists such as the Grifters, Swell, Pavement, Smog, Will Oldham and Guided By Voices, their name comes from an unpublished Paul Verlaine libretto. They were signed to Big Cat (UK) Records in 1995 and released their self-titled debut album in 1996 when John Peel began playing their recordings and invited them to record the first of four Peel sessions.

Both Martine Roberts and Clive Painter have been known for collaborating with other bands such as Tram, Monograph and The Real Tuesday Weld.

== Members ==
- Martine Roberts (1994–2004)
- Clive Painter (1994–2004)

Guest musicians

- Rob Crutchley (1995) – Monograph
- Paul Anderson (1997–1999) – Tram
- Nick Avery (1997–1999) – Tram
- Jon Hamilton (1999–2000) – Ligament, Part Chimp
- Andrew Blick (2000–2002) – Blowpipe
- Sean Newsham (2000–2002) – Quickspace
- Alex Morris (2000–2002) – Candidate
- Mark Wilsher (1999–2002) – Faith Over Reason

== Discography ==
Albums

- Broken Dog (Big Cat Records), (1996)
- Zero (Big Cat Records), (1998)
- Sleeve with Hearts (Piao!), (1999)
- Brighter Now (Kitty Kitty), (2001)
- Harmonia (Tongue Master Records), (2004)
- Flips (Selected B-sides + Rarities) (Tongue Master Records), (2017)

Singles & EPs

- "Throw Everything Away" (Big Cat Records), (1996)
- "Trails" (Big Cat Records), (1997)
- "Safety in Numbers" (Big Cat Records), (1998)
- "They Were Real" (Piao!), (1999)
- "Anchor" (Kitty Kitty), (2001)
- "Radios" (Tongue Master Records), (2002)

Compilations

- Past, Present, Future (Big Cat Records), (1997)
- Songs for the Blue Times (Autoreverse), (2000)
- The Pot Machine Turns You On (Ptolemaic Terrascope), (2000)
- A Wish on a Star (Dreamy Records), (2001)
- Homesleep Home, Cover Songs (Homesleep), (2001)
