= The Real Tuesday Weld =

British band

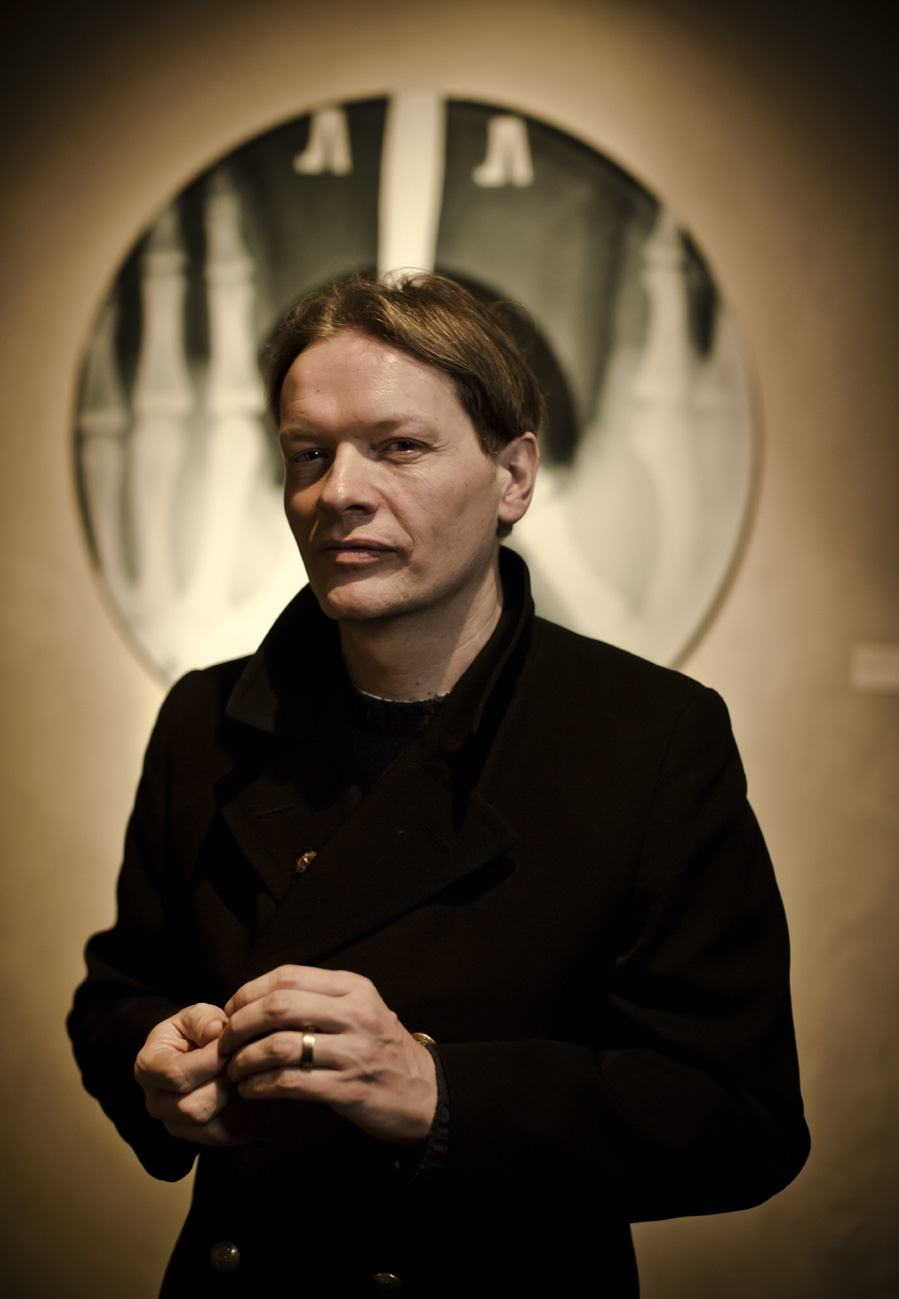
- Singer and producer Stephen Coates

Background information
- Origin: United Kingdom
- Genres: Indie pop, lounge, electro swing, dark cabaret, music hall, hauntology
- Years active: 1999–present
- Label: AntiqueBeat Crammed Six Degrees Records
- Members: Stephen Coates; Jacques Van Rhijn; Clive Painter; Don Brosnan; Matt Snowden
- Past members: David Guez; Brian Lee; Josephine Lloyd; Geraldine McEwan; Jed Woodhouse
- Website: www.tuesdayweld.com

The Real Tuesday Weld are a British band formed in 2001 by lead singer and producer Stephen Coates, who studied at the Royal College of Art. They have released several albums, singles and EPs, and many tracks on compilations. Their combination of big-band jazz era sounds with electronica and vintage-style animations has been influential on the current range of electro swing artists and DJs. Their live shows are usually accompanied by visuals in the form of bespoke films and animations.

The band is named after American actress Tuesday Weld. Coates once had a dream involving Weld and 1930s vocalist Al Bowlly and cites it as inspiration for the band's particular style. (A German alternative/indie rock band by the name of Tuesday Weld, that released two albums and four singles in the 1990s, is not related.)

Coates lives in Clerkenwell, London. "The Clerkenwell Kid", often cited or credited as the band's producer/re-mixer, is an alter ego for Coates himself. Their 2009 album The Clerkenwell Kid: Live at the End of the World is an imaginary live recording of a concert on the "eve of the apocalypse". The Clerkenwell Kid is also the main character in a London-based mythology that Coates has developed around his love of the city's history and stories.

In early 2021 Coates announced on the band's website that the Real Tuesday Weld would be winding up "in the next year or so" after the release of three final albums – Blood (released in May 2021), Dreams (released in September 2022) and Bone.

== Distribution ==
The Real Tuesday Weld releases are currently distributed by Antique Beat (UK) and Cargo Records (UK). They are published by Mute Records. Previously releases have been by Crammed (Europe, Australasia, South America) and Six Degrees Records (North America), Kindercore Records, Dreamy Records, Bambini Records, PIAS Recordings and Motorway Records.

== Soundtracks ==
The band's album The Last Werewolf is a soundtrack to the novel of the same name (2012) by childhood friend Glen Duncan, reprising their joint work on Duncan's novel I, Lucifer (2004). BBC Music reviewer Lisa Haines described the I, Lucifer soundtrack as "[a] remarkably wonderful album ... a melancholic collection of sardonic whispers, melodious instrumentals and woozy, underhand beats". Uncut said it was "[m]eticulously arranged, touching, intimate, and with mesmerising melodies". In 2010–11, Coates also co-wrote and produced an album Horseplay as "Lazarus and the Plane Crash", a collaboration with Joe Coles of UK cult garage rockers The Guillotines that was released on Antique Beat in 2012. Every year since 2003, the band have released a Christmas EP of songs and spoken word elements.

The band have worked with many animators and filmmakers, particularly the Russian animator Alex Budovsky and the American animator George Fort on several international award-winning films. Their "Bathtime in Clerkenwell" cut (from the I, Lucifer album) appears as the soundtrack for Budovsky's innovative multi-award-winning short film of the same title.

Coates has written music for various independent features including Paul Cotter's Bomber (2009) and the US indies Meeting Spencer (2011), The Suspect (2013) and Meet Me in Montenegro (2014) as well as the French movie Encore heureux (2016), directed by Benoit Graffin. He has also written for several documentaries and short films including US cult series The Midnight Archive, The Man Who Married Kittens, a biopic of anthropomorphic taxidermist Walter Potter, several Everyman programmes for BBC Two and for a series of documentaries made by Amnesty International about the Syrian conflict.

The band have had many existing tracks used in films, television shows and advertisements. Their song "I Love the Rain" was used in an advertisement for Chevrolet in 2011. The 2013 Apple iPad advertisement featured the piano instrumental "The Lupine Waltz" from The Last Werewolf album. The song "Last Words" (from the album The London Book of the Dead) is cut throughout and plays over the final scenes of Sony Pictures' 2008 film Nick and Norah's Infinite Playlist by indie cult director Peter Sollett (who is known for his feature film Raising Victor Vargas).

== Remixes ==
Coates has re-mixed several artists including Duke Ellington, Count Basie, David Byrne and The Puppini Sisters in their burlesque-style re-make of "Crazy in Love" by Beyoncé. The Real Tuesday Weld have collaborated widely with artists including Brazilian electronic chanteuse Cibelle, English nu-folk diva Mara Carlyle, Guillotines vocalist Joe Coles, Martyn Jacques, leader of The Tiger Lillies, and Pinkie Maclure.

== Other music ==
In 2007, Coates was commissioned to write music for the Rothko room at the Tate Modern, London and the band re-scored the surrealist cult film Dreams That Money Can Buy for the British Film Institute. Other commissioned arts projects include "Propaganda from the State of Love" at London's Victoria and Albert Museum for the 2008 Cold War Modern exhibition.

In 2010/11, he was commissioned to write and produce the original songs for the Rockstar Games title L.A. Noire. The recordings feature the Real Tuesday Weld with German singer Claudia Brücken of the band Propaganda.

== X-Ray Audio ==
In 2014, Coates launched The X-Ray Audio Project, an initiative to provide a resource of information about "Roentgenizdat" Soviet bootleg recordings of forbidden music made on used X-rays in the 1940s and 1950s. The project archives visual images, information, audio recordings and interviews made during travels in Russia with photographer Paul Heartfield as the basis for a book X-Ray Audio: The Strange Story of Soviet Music on the Bone published in November 2015 by Strange Attractor Press.

The pair have made a short documentary film X-Ray Audio – The Documentary with UK organisation The Vinyl Factory and the longer form Roentgenizdat which was awarded the best documentary prize at the London Russian Film Festival in 2017.

They hold multimedia events where Coates tells the story of the Soviet bootleggers and they cut new X-ray records from live performances as a demonstration of the process involved in the UK, US and Europe, working with various musicians including Thurston Moore, Marc Almond and Barry Adamson. Coates delivered a talk on the project at TEDx in Kraków in June 2015.

The project has become a major touring exhibition showing in London, Belfast and Newcastle, County Down (Northern Ireland), Trieste, Moscow, St Petersburg, Tel Aviv and Tokyo.

In March 2019, as The Bureau of Lost Culture, Coates and Heartfield cut audio by Massive Attack, Jonsi, Noam Chomsky amongst others onto X-ray for "The Library of Dangerous Thoughts" project by the University of the Underground.

== Broadcasting and other work ==
Outside music, Coates has written for various publications and radio and worked with various arts organisations. His label Antique Beat presents the monthly "Salon for the City" in Westminster and curates various arts events including "32 Londoners" and "London Month of the Dead" based around the city's history and mythology.

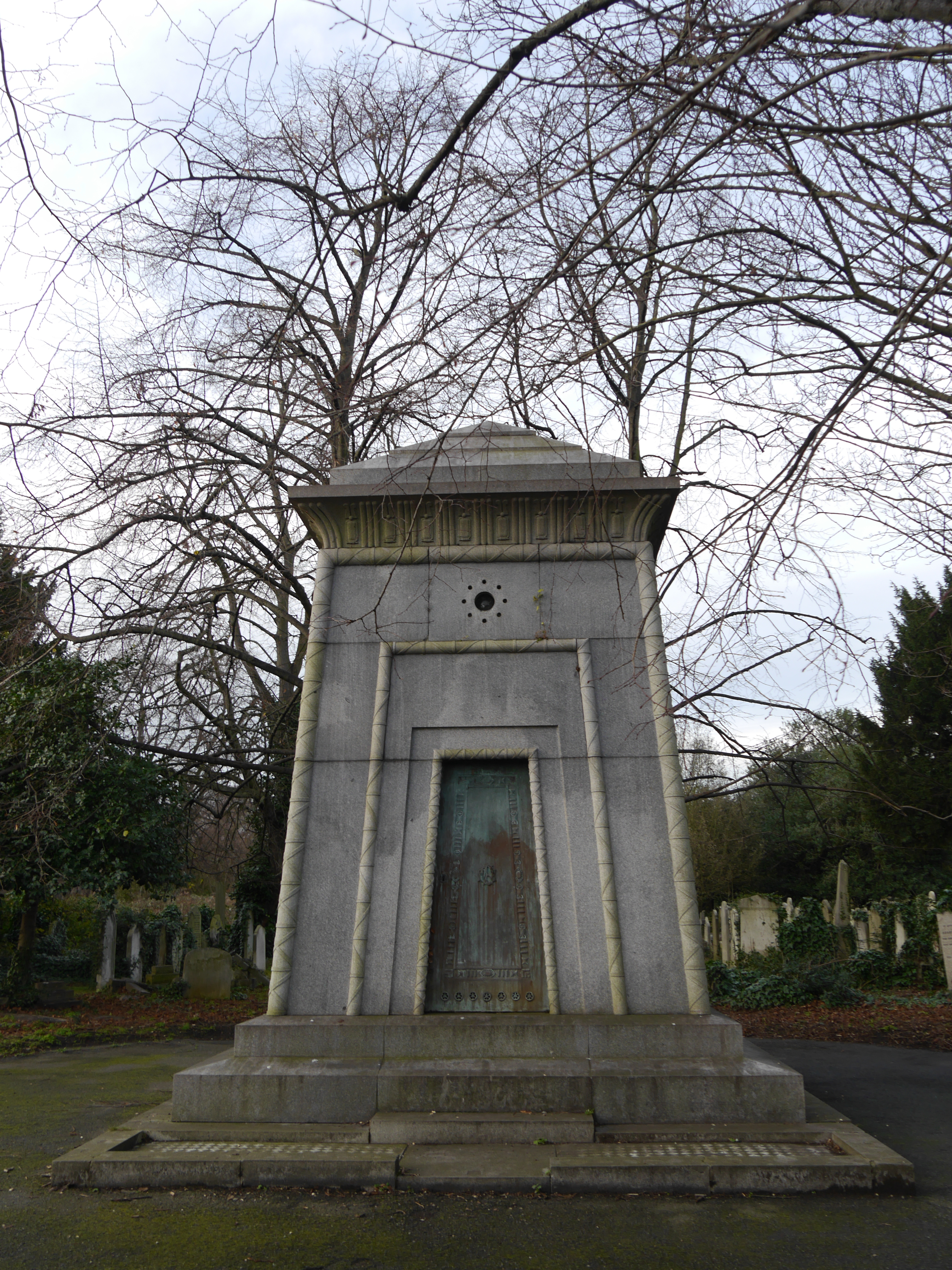
Hannah Courtoy mausoleum, Brompton Cemetery

His involvement with and writing about the tomb of Hannah Courtoy in Brompton Cemetery has encouraged speculation that it contains a working time machine. He has written for Collecteurs, Londonist, The Quietus, Garage Magazine, and other publications and has narrated voice-overs for various animations.

In 2008, he wrote and presented a series of eight radio programmes: US and THEM: Sounds of Propaganda and the Cold War on London arts radio station Resonance FM. In 2012 he appeared at the Fiona Shaw-directed arts project Peace Camp, part of the 2012 Cultural Olympiad, providing a vocal take on Nick Cave's lyrics to the song "Into My Arms" with A. L. Kennedy.

In February 2015, he wrote and narrated an essay for the BBC Radio 3 series Just Juvenilia, telling the story of his visit to the underground river Fleet in London, the time he lived in a Buddhist monastery and the circumstances surrounding the forming of The Real Tuesday Weld in the late 1990s.

In November 2015, his publishing company Antique Beat and Earth Recordings released Film Music, a three-album set of music by the Russian film composer Mikael Tariverdiev, a project Coates had been working on since he first heard the composer's music in Moscow in 2011. In November 2017 a follow-up release was made of the complete soundtrack to the Soviet classic comedy of errors The Irony of Fate, the score from the TV series Olga Sergeevna was released in October 2017 and the original sound track for the 1970s Soviet blockbuster series Seventeen Moments of Spring was released in November 2018.

In 2018, he wrote and presented a series of five radio programmes on London arts radio station Soho Radio on various subjects related to bootleg music and vinyl culture.

In 2019, he wrote and presented Bone Music, a documentary based around interviews carried out in Russia for an edition of BBC Radio 3's Between the Ears series. The programme told the story of an underground culture of forbidden music in the Cold War-era Soviet Union and featured the Russian band Mumiy Troll.

He currently presents The Bureau of Lost Culture, a bi-monthly show about counter-cultural themes.

== Discography ==
Most of the band's albums have had multiple versions released in different territories. They have also issued several private releases including an "Audio Christmas card" with exclusive tracks each year since 2000. This discography is not complete, though it does cover the major releases.

=== Albums ===
- At The House of the Clerkenwell Kid (2001, Bambini)
- Where Psyche Meets Cupid (2001, Kindercore Records)
- When Cupid Meets Psyche (2001, Dreamy Records)
- I, Lucifer (2002, PIAS Recordings; edited and released 2004, Six Degrees Records) Soundtrack/companion to the novel I, Lucifer by Glen Duncan
- Les Aperitifs et Les Digestifs (2004, Dreamy Records). A live album that includes unreleased songs and covers
- The Return of the Clerkenwell Kid (2005, Six Degrees Records)
- Dreams That Money Can Buy (2006, BFI). Alternative soundtrack to the 1948 surrealist cult film by Hans Richter
- The London Book of the Dead (2007, Six Degrees Records / Antique Beat)
- The Clerkenwell Kid: Live at the End of the World (2008, Six Degrees Records / Antique Beat). Limited live recording made by The Clerkenwell Kid "on the eve of the apocalypse"
- The Last Werewolf (2011, Six Degrees Records / Crammed Discs). Soundtrack/companion to the novel The Last Werewolf by Glen Duncan
- Horseplay as "Lazarus and the Plane Crash" with Joe Coles (2013, Antique Beat)
- Blood (2021)
- Dreams (2022)
- Late Flowering Reveries (2025)

=== EPs ===
- The Valentine EP (2000, Dreamy Records)
- L'amour et la morte, (2000, Kindercore Records)
- The Meteorology of Love (2001, Bambini)
- The Ugly and the Beautiful (2004, PIAS Recordings)
- Bathtime in Clerkenwell EP (2004, PIAS UK/Six Degrees Records)
- Joyeux Noel (2008, Antique Beat)
- Kix – Bent Remixes (2008, Six Degrees Records)
- Seasons Dreamings (2009, Antique Beat)
- A Dream at the End of a Year (2009, Antique Beat)
- Seasons Songs (2010, Antique Beat)
- Moon Setting (2011, Crammed)
- Happy Dreams-Mass (2011, Antique Beat)
- Seasons Dreamings (2012, Antique Beat)
- A Wish at Christmas (2012, Antique Beat)
- Seasons Dreamings (2013, Antique Beat)
- In Memorium (2013, Antique Beat)
- I Love my Umbrella (2014, Antique Beat)
- Happy Hatter Christmas (2014, Antique Beat)
- Happy X-Raymas (2015, Antique Beat)
- An Alchemical Christmas (2016, Antique Beat)
- Seasons Dreamings (2017, Antique Beat)
- The Crooner's Christmas (2018, Antique Beat)
- A Cuckoo Christmas Card (2019, Antique Beat)
- Kaleidoscopic Christmas (2020, Antique Beat)

=== Singles ===
- "Trojan Horses" (1999, Dreamy Records)
- "I Love The Rain" (7") (2001, Dreamy Records)
- "Am I in Love?" (2001, Motorway Records)
- "Still Terminally Ambivalent Over You" (2005, Play It Again Sam)
- "Last Words" (2009, Antique Beat)
- "Ruth, Roses and Revolvers" (2010, Tongue Master)
- "Blood Knuckled and Dusted" (2021, Antique Beat)
- "Bone Dreams Blood" (2022)

=== Compilation tracks: a selection ===
- "The Days of You & Me (Remix)" on Kindercore 50 (2000, Kindercore Records)
- "I Like It That Way" on Kindercore 50 (2000, Kindercore Records)
- "The Return of the Clerkenwell Kid" on A Wish Upon a Star (2001, Dreamy Records)
- "I love the Rain (Stormy Weather Mix)" on Little Darla Vol. 17 (2001, Little Darla)
- "At the House of the Clerkenwell Kid (Carousel Mix)" on Carousel Vol. 3 (2002, Carousel)
- "Declan's Bad Days" on Comes with a Smile Vol. 8 (2003, Comes with a Smile)
- "Declan's Little White Birds" on Comes with a Smile Vol. 8 (2003, Comes with a Smile)
- "One More Chance" on Little Darla Vol. 20 (2003, Little Darla)
- "Bathtime in Clerkenwell" on Transmusicale 26 (2004, Transmusicale)
- "Bathtime in Clerkenwell" on Luffkasellet 3 (2005, Music for Dreams)
- "Bathtime in Clerkenwell" on Weeds Volume 2: Music from the Showtime Original Series (2006, Lions Gate Films)
- "The Ugly and the Beautiful" on The Thrill of Collette (2005, N.O.I.S.E./Collette)
- "The Eternal Seduction of Eve" on The Thrill of Collette (2005, N.O.I.S.E./Collette)
- "The Ugly and the Beautiful" on Siddhartha (2005, George V Records)
- "The Day Before You Came" on Backspin: A Six Degrees 10 Year Anniversary Project (2007, Six Degrees Records)
- "Yes, I Love You (Shrift Remix)" on Eden (2007, Six Degrees Records)
- "Paris Blues (Duke Ellington Remix)" on Cinematic (2007, Six Degrees Records)
- "Bringing the Body Back Home (Feat. Cibelle)" on Traveller 08 (2008, Six Degrees Records)
- "Kix" on Buddha Bar X (2008, George V Records)
- "Last Words" on Nick and Norah's Infinite Playlist Soundtrack (2008, Atlantic Records)
- "Last Days" on Songs for a Year (2009, Peppermill Recordings)
- "Cloud Cuckooland" on Swing Style Volume 2 (2009, Lola's World)
- "The Sweetest Songs" on Twisted Cabaret (2010, Volvox)
- "Little Boxes" on Indie Lullabies (2010, American Laundromat Records)
- "Guilty, Torched Song, I Always Kill the Things I Love" on L.A. Noire Soundtrack (2011, Verve Records)
- "Musique pour une Film Francaise" on Smoked and Uncut (2012, Limewire)
- "Kix" on Smoked and Uncut (2012, Limewire)
- "The English Alchemist" on Smoked and Uncut (2012, Limewire)
- "The Eternal Seduction of Eve" on A Magical Journey (2012, Klangmeister)
- "Song of December" on Festivus (2012, Highline Records)
- "Musique pour une Film Francaise" on Smoked and Uncut (2012, Limewire)
- "Last Tango in Clerkenwell" on Electro-Swing V (2013, Wagram Music)
- "Theme for the Experimental Record Group" on The Twilight Language of Nigel Kneale (2013)
- "Pony Swing" on Electro-Swing VII (2014, Wagram Music)

=== Cover versions ===
- "Stand by Your Man" (original by Tammy Wynette)
- "La Javanaise" (original by Serge Gainsbourg)
- "Little Boxes" (original by Malvina Reynolds)
- "Poker Face" (original by Lady Gaga)
- "The Day Before You Came" (original by ABBA)

=== Remixes ===
- After All for Bebel Gilberto (2005, Six Degrees Records)
- Yes, I Love You for Shrift (2006, Six Degrees Records)
- Paris Blues for Duke Ellington (2007, Six Degrees Records)
- Asa Branca for David Byrne / Forro in the Dark (2007, Nublu)
- Crazy in Love for The Puppini Sisters (2008, Universal/Verve Records)
- Good Morning Blues for Count Basie (2008, Verve Records)
- Makes Me Happy for Undersea Poem (2010, Six Degrees Records)
- Step into Christmas for The Puppini Sisters (2010, Universal/Verve Records)
- Strange is the man for Piers Faccini (2011, Six Degrees Records)
- Stop Googlin' Me for Bart and Baker (2013, Wagram Music)
- Pony Swing for Dr Cat (2014, Green Queen, Music)
- The Big Easy for Pete Thomas (2014, EMI)
- Ugly Bones for Piney Gir (2015, Damaged Goods)
- Work It for The Puppini Sisters (2016, Millionaire Records)
- St Tropez for The Delia Derbyshire Appreciation Society (2017, Six Degrees Records)
- Joe Palooka for Heavy Sugar (2019, Freshly Squeezed)

== Publications ==
- Coates, Stephen. X-Ray Audio: The Strange Story of Soviet Music on the Bone, Strange Attractor Press, 2015. ISBN 9781907222382

== Articles and interviews ==
- Coates, Stephen (18 August 2006). "The Stuff of Dreams". The Guardian.
- Stone, Aug (4 November 2011). "Interview: The Real Tuesday Weld". God Is in the TV.
- Raggenau, Nicholas (12 January 2012). "Interview with Stephen Coates (The Real Tuesday Weld, English version)". Paris DJs.
- Martin, Michel (9 January 2016). "Bones And Grooves: The Weird Secret History Of Soviet X-Ray Music". NPR.
- Leonard, Christine (11 July 2016). "The Clerkenwell Kid – The Real Tuesday Weld: Stephen Coates Interviewed by Christine Leonard". The Born Interviewer.
- Röttgers, Philipp (5 May 2021). "Talks beyond time and place – Episode 14: Stephen Coates about Time, Space and London Myths." London beyond time and place. Retrieved 15 February 2025.

== See also ==
- Antique Beat
- Clive Painter
- Ribs (recordings)
