= Quickspace (album) =

Studio album by Quickspace
- Released: November 1996
- Recorded: 1996
- Genre: Space rock, krautrock, noise pop
- Length: 44:55
- Label: Kitty Kitty
- Producer: Jonathan Digby

Quickspace chronology
Quickspace (1996)	Precious Falling (1998)

Professional ratings
Review scores
Source	Rating
AllMusic	(UK)
AllMusic	(US)

Quickspace is the debut album released by London-based experimental rock band Quickspace. The album was initially released in 1996 on their own Kitty Kitty Corporation label, and then re-released on 18 November 1997 for the USA market through Slash Records, with a slightly different track listing and revised art work.

== Track listing ==
All tracks are written by Tom Cullinan

UK release
No.	Title	Length
1.	"Swisher"	4:45
2.	"Song For Someone"	7:46
3.	"Quasi-Pfaff"	8:36
4.	"Mousetail"	3:32
5.	"Winona"	7:29
6.	"Docile One"	4:17
7.	"Docile Two"	8:27
Total length:		44:52

All tracks are written by Tom Cullinan

US release
No.	Title	Length
1.	"Rise"	5:15
2.	"Swisher"	4:45
3.	"Song For Someone"	7:46
4.	"Quasi-Pfaff"	8:36
5.	"Winona"	7:29
6.	"Docile One"	4:17
7.	"Docile Two"	8:27
8.	"Friend"	3:33
Total length:		49:59
