= I, Lucifer (Real Tuesday Weld album) =

Studio album by The Real Tuesday Weld
- Released: 2003
- Recorded: 2002
- Genre: Indie pop, lounge, electro swing, music hall, dark cabaret
- Length: 43:20
- Label: PIAS

The Real Tuesday Weld chronology
'Where Psyche Meets Cupid' (2001)	I, Lucifer (2003)	'Les Aperitifs et Les Digestifs' (2004)

I, Lucifer is the third studio album by British band The Real Tuesday Weld and was released in 2003. It was intended as a companion soundtrack to the novel I, Lucifer by Glen Duncan. "Bathtime In Clerkenwell" is the song used by Alex Budovsky in the short animation Bathtime in Clerkenwell. At least four different versions of the album exist – the first incarnation on Dreamy Records, the second on PIAS recordings in Europe and the third on Six Degrees in the US. A picture-disc vinyl release accompanied the 2004 PIAS re-release of the album. Each version of the album features different sequencing and different mixes of the tracks "Bathtime in Clerkenwell" and "The Ugly & The Beautiful". Additionally, the entire album was newly remixed for its U.S. release in 2004. It was awarded album of the week in The Times and The Daily Telegraph and has generally been critically lauded.

AllMusic described it as "sort of a cross between a song cycle and a tone poem that depicts the Devil's attempt to return to earth and take another shot at mortality and repentance."

== Track listings ==
=== (2003 Dreamy Records; UK release) ===
Credited as "(The Real) Tuesday Weld" Released 3 February 2003

1. "It's a Dirty Job But Somebody's Got To Do It" – 0:45
2. "Bathtime in Clerkenwell" – 2:52
3. "The Ugly & The Beautiful" – 4:09
4. "Someday (Soon)" – 2:56
5. "Coming Back Down to Earth"
6. "One More Chance" – 3:44
7. "La Bete et La Belle" – 2:54
8. "The Root of All Evil"
9. "The Eternal Seduction of Eve" – 3:54
10. "Heaven Can't Wait" – 3:22
11. "The Show Must Go On" – 3:06
12. "Someday (Never)"
13. "The Pearly Gates" (hidden track)

=== 2004 PIAS; UK re-release ===
Released 31 May 2004

1. "It's a Dirty Job But Somebody's Got To Do It" – 0:45
2. "Bathtime in Clerkenwell" – 2:52
3. "The Ugly & The Beautiful" – 3:06
4. "(Still) Terminally Ambivalent Over You" – 3:09
5. "Coming Back Down to Earth" – 3:26
6. "One More Chance" – 4:08
7. "The Eternal Seduction of Eve" – 3:52
8. "La Bete et La Belle" – 2:49
9. "The Life and Times of the Clerkenwell Kid" – 3:42
10. "The Show Must Go On" – 3:05
11. "Heaven Can't Wait" – 3:12
12. "Someday" – 6:53
13. "The Pearly Gates" (Hidden Track)
14. "Bathtime in Clerkenwell" (Video)

=== 2004 PIAS; UK vinyl picture disc release ===
Side one:

1. "It's a Dirty Job But Somebody's Got To Do It"
2. "Bathtime in Clerkenwell"
3. "The Ugly & The Beautiful"
4. "(Still) Terminally Ambivalent Over You"
5. "Coming Back Down to Earth"
6. "The Eternal Seduction of Eve"
7. "One More Chance"

Side two:

1. "La Bete et La Belle"
2. "The Life and Times of the Clerkenwell Kid"
3. "The Show Must Go On"
4. "Heaven Can't Wait"
5. "Someday"
6. "The Pearly Gates"

=== 2004 Six Degrees; US release ===
Released 11 May 2004

1. "It's a Dirty Job But Somebody's Got To Do It" – 0:43
2. "Bathtime in Clerkenwell" – 2:52
3. "The Ugly & The Beautiful" – 3:07
4. "(Still) Terminally Ambivalent Over You" – 3:12
5. "Someday (Never)" – 2:36
6. "One More Chance" – 3:44
7. "The Eternal Seduction Of Eve" – 3:54
8. "La Bete et La Belle" – 2:54
9. "Easter Parade" – 3:46
10. "The Life and Times of the Clerkenwell Kid" – 3:43
11. "The Show Must Go On" – 3:06
12. "Heaven Can't Wait" – 3:22
13. "Someday (Soon)" – 2:56
14. "The Pearly Gates" – 3:17
