= Septimus Holmes Godson =

British barrister (1799–1877)

Septimus Holmes Godson (1799–1877) was a British barrister who was called to the bar at Gray's Inn in 1837. He was the youngest son of William Godson who died in 1822. His brother was Richard Godson (1797–1849) who was member of Parliament for St Albans in 1831–32 and then Kidderminster 1832–34 and 1837–1849.

In 1830, Godson married Susannah Courtoy (1807-1895), daughter of Hannah Courtoy.
