= Goodson (disambiguation) =

Goodson is an English surname.

Goodson may also refer to:

- Goodson, Missouri
- HMS Goodson (K480), British warship
- Goodson Records, A British record company and label that produced flexible records active 1928-1931
