= Precious Falling =

Studio album by Quickspace
- Released: 31 August 1998
- Recorded: 1997–1998
- Genre: Noise pop
- Length: 70:42
- Label: Kitty Kitty, Domino, Hidden Agenda
- Producer: Tom Cullinan

Quickspace chronology
Quickspace (1997)	Precious Falling (1998)	The Death of Quickspace (2000)

Professional ratings
Review scores
Source	Rating
AllMusic	4.5/5 stars
Pitchfork Media	7.8/10

Precious Falling is the second album by Quickspace, released in 1998.

== Critical reception ==
The Independent called Precious Falling "a confidently diverse album, ranging from murkier, muted vocal early tracks like 'Take Away' to the country-flavoured, violin-weeping epic, 'Goodbye Precious Mountain'." The Sunday Times determined that "tunes that Stereolab would render with academic earnestness are here given a good kicking, wobbly girl-boy vocals lending everything an air of first-take euphoria."

AllMusic wrote: "Most interesting are the experimental and filmic songs like 'Hadid', 'The Mountain Waltz' and 'Goodbye Precious Mountain', where the band stretch their remixing and arranging skills." Magnet thought that "where Stereolab made music for cocktail parties and designer drugs, Quickspace’s Cullinan and singer Nina Pascale were loaded for mushrooms and cheap wine."

== Track listing ==
1. "Death + Annie" – 4:02
2. "Take Away" – 4:17
3. "Mouse" – 7:39
4. "7 Like That" – 5:19
5. "Quickspace Happy Song #2" – 6:32
6. "Hadid" – 5:14
7. "Melo" – 2:12
8. "Minors" – 6:43
9. "Coca Lola" – 5:49
10. "Obvious" – 5:20
11. "Walk Me Home" – 6:37
12. "The Mountain Waltz" – 4:08
13. "Goodbye Precious Mountain" – 6:44

Vinyl version

1. "Death + Annie" – 4:02
2. "Take Away" – 4:17
3. "Mouse" – 7:39
4. "7 Like That" – 5:19
5. "Quickspace Happy Song #2" – 6:32
6. "Hadid" – 5:14
7. "Melo" – 2:12
8. "Minors" – 6:43
9. "Coca Lola" – 5:49
10. "Stokey Lola"
11. "Obvious" – 5:20
12. "Walk Me Home" – 6:37
13. "The Mountain Waltz" – 4:08
14. "The Precious Mountain"
15. "Goodbye Precious Mountain" – 6:44
