= Tram (band) =

British slowcore band

- Origin: London, England, UK
- Genres: Slowcore; Indie rock
- Years active: 1998 to 2002
- Labels: Setanta Records, Piao!, Jetset Records,
- Members: Paul Anderson; Nick Avery
- Past members: Ida Akesson; Fiona Brice; Bill Lloyd; Clive Painter; Ian Painter; Martine Roberts

Tram were a British musical duo composed of Paul Anderson and Nick Avery. Part of the slowcore movement, Tram was recognized for lush instrumentation played at a very slow pace. Tram recorded three albums, all of which were well received by the music press.

Their first album, Heavy Black Frame, was produced by multi-instrumentalist Clive Painter, and features him and his partner in Broken Dog, Martine Roberts, alongside Placebo keyboardist Bill Lloyd. Heavy Black Frame was released on the Piao! label in the UK, and Jetset Records in USA. The subsequent UK albums appeared on Setanta Records. In January 2009 Paul Anderson and Clive Painter formed a new band called the 99 Call, and performed their first show in Rimini, Italy in July 2009. The performance was in part a celebration of the tenth anniversary of the release of Heavy Black Frame.

== Members ==
- Paul Anderson
- Nick Avery

Collaborators

- Ida Akesson (piano, keyboards)
- Fiona Brice (violin, piano)
- John Frennet (bass)
- Bill Lloyd (piano)
- Hannah Marshall (cello)
- Clive Painter (production, guitar, bass, harmonium, piano, clarinet, percussion)
- Ian Painter (bass)
- John Parish (production, slide guitar)
- Martine Roberts (production, bass, vocals)
- Ian Watson (trumpet)

== Discography ==
=== Albums ===
- Heavy Black Frame (1999), Piao!
- Frequently Asked Questions (2000), Setanta Records
- A Kind of Closure (2002), Setanta Records
- The Anderson Tapes (2017), Magnetic Ribbon Recordings

=== Singles ===
- Nothing Left To Say (7" single), Piao! Records
- High Ground (7" single), Piao! Records
- Songs From The Sturdy Chariot (7" single), Liquafaction
