= List of film music by Mikael Tariverdiev =

This is a list of film music by Mikael Tariverdiev

== List of films ==
- Vsyo to, o chyom my tak dolgo mechtali (1997)
- Propavshaya ekspeditsiya (1996) (TV)
- Letnie lyudi (1995)
- Vorovka (1995) (TV)
- Vsyo vokrug zasypalo snegom (1995)
- Nezabudki (1994) (as M. Tariverdiyev)
- Roman 'alla russa' (1994)
- Russkiy regtaym (1993)
- Tantsuyushchiye prizraki (1992)
- Ya obeshchala, ya uydu... (1992)
- I vozvrashchaetsya veter... (1991)
- Nochnye zabavy (1991)
- Smert v kino (1990)
- Zagadka Endkhauza (1989)
- Aelita, ne pristavay k muzhchinam! (1988)
- Etyud osveshcheniya (1988)
- Kommentariy k prosheniyu o pomilovanii (1988)
- Porog (1988)
- Razorvannyy krug (1987)
- Konets operatsii Rezident (1986)
- Mednyy angel (1984)
- Uchenik lekarya (1983)
- Predchuvstviye lyubvi (1982)
- Vozvrashcheniye rezidenta (1982)
- My, nizhepodpisavshiyesya (1981) (TV)
- Adam zhenitsya na Eve (1980) (TV)
- Dozhd v chuzhom gorode (1979) (TV)
- Staromodnaya komediya (1979) (as Mikael Tarawerdijew)
- Zolotaya rechka (1976)
- Ironiya sudby, ili S lyogkim parom! (Irony of Fate) (1975) (TV)
- Propavshaya ekspeditsiya (1975)
- "Semnadtsat mgnoveniy vesny" (Seventeen Moments of Spring) (1973) (mini) TV Series
- Zemlya, do vostrebovaniya (1972)
- Sudba rezidenta (1970)
- Korol-olen (1969)
- Tsena (1969)
- Malenky shcolny orcestr (1968)
- Lyubit (1968)
- Vostochny koridor (1968)
- Proshchay (1967)
- Razbudite Mukhina (1967)
- Spasite utopayushchego (1967)
- Bolshaya ruda (1964)
- Dobro pozhalovat, ili postoronnim vkhod vospreshchyon (1964)
- Do svidaniya, malchiki! (1964)
- Do zavtra... (1964)
- Moy mladshiy brat (1962)
- Chelovek idyot za solntsem (1961)
- Dlinnyy den (1961)
- Yunost nashikh otsov (1958)
