= Supo Spot =

Studio album by Quickspace
- Released: June 1997
- Recorded: 1994–1997
- Genre: Lo-fi, drone, rock
- Label: Kitty Kitty
- Producer: Tom Cullinan, Jonathan Digby

Professional ratings
Review scores
| Source | Rating |
|---|---|
| AllMusic | 3.5/5 stars |
| NME | 7/10 |
| Uncut | 3/5 stars |

Supo Spot is a compilation album by Quickspace, released in 1997 via Kitty Kitty. It is a collection of early singles and other rarities/b-sides.

== Critical reception ==
NME wrote that the compilation "is a more one-dimensional affair than the band's debut album proper, where their lo-fi ethics dovetailed nicely with the techno back-to-analogue school ... But the inspired delirium here is a fine companion piece."

== Track listing ==
1. "Quickspace Happy Song #1" – 2:40
2. "Unique Slippy" – 4:27
3. "Extraplus" – 2:44
4. "Found A Way" – 3:25
5. "Do It My Own Way" – 3:59
6. "The Whiff 'N' Spoof Song" – 7:09
7. "Exemplary Swishy" – 6:41
8. "Friend" – 3:34
9. "Where Have All The Good Times Gone?" – 7:40
10. "Song For NME" – 5:23
