= The Return of the Clerkenwell Kid =

Studio album by The Real Tuesday Weld
- Released: 2005
- Genre: Indie pop Lounge music Music hall Electro swing Dark cabaret
- Length: 56:09
- Label: Six Degrees Records

Professional ratings
Review scores
Source	Rating
AllMusic	3.5/5 stars
Pitchfork Media	6.9/10
Tiny Mix Tapes	3/5 stars
PopMatters	4/10

The Return of the Clerkenwell Kid is an album by The Real Tuesday Weld, released in 2005.

== Track listing ==
1. "Waking Up" – 0:34
2. "Anything But Love" – 3:30
3. "On Lavender Hill" – 3:54
4. "At the House of the Clerkenwell Kid" – 3:28
5. "L'amour et la morte" – 4:11
6. "Bruises" – 1:35
7. "Turn on the Sun Again" – 3:37
8. "Close Your Eyes When You Read This" – 1:24
9. "Daisies" – 4:17
10. "Something Beautiful" – 5:17
11. "Déjà Vu" – 2:06
12. "The Birds and the Bees" – 4:00
13. "Little White Birds" – 2:35
14. "I Love the Rain" – 4:13
15. "Asteroids" – 4:17
16. "Am I in Love?" – 3:42
17. "Goodbye Stephen" – 3:29
