= Mikael Tariverdiev =

Soviet composer (1931–1996)

Mikael Tariverdiev Микаэл Таривердиев

Background information
- Also known as: Mikayel Levoni Tariverdian
- Born: August 15, 1931; Tiflis, TSFSR, Soviet Union
- Died: July 25, 1996 (aged 64) Sochi, Russia
- Genres: Film, opera, romance
- Occupation: Composer
- Instruments: Organ, piano
- Award: USSR State Prize

Mikael Leonovich Tariverdiev (Note: Russian: Микаэл Леонович Таривердиев, romanized: Mikael Leonovich Tariverdiyev; Armenian: Միքայել Լևոնի Թարիվերդյան, romanized: Mik'ayel Lewoni T'ariverdyan; Georgian: მიქაელ ლეონის ძე ტარივერდიევი, romanized: Mikael Leonis dze T'ariverdievi) (also Mikayel Levoni Tariverdian; 15 August 1931 – 25 July 1996) was a Soviet composer of Armenian descent. He headed the Composers' Guild of the Soviet Cinematographers' Union from its inception and is most famous for his movie scores, primarily the score to Seventeen Moments of Spring.

== Biography ==
"Seventeen Moments of Spring Main Theme"

Mikael Tariverdiev was born in Tbilisi, Soviet Union to Armenian parents, but lived and worked in Russia. His father, Levon Tariverdiev, was from Baku but a native of Nagorno-Karabakh. His mother, Satenik, was Georgian Armenian. He studied at the Komitas State Conservatory of Yerevan for two years and then graduated from the Moscow Gnessin Institute in the class of Aram Khachaturian in 1957.

Tariverdiev wrote over 100 romances and four operas, including the comic opera Count Cagliostro and the mono-opera "The Waiting". However, he is mostly known for his scores to many popular Soviet movies (more than 130 in total), including "Seventeen Moments of Spring" and "The Irony of Fate"—see List of film music by Mikael Tariverdiev.

He received many awards, including the USSR State Prize in 1977 and the Prize of the American Music Academy in 1975. In 1986 he was awarded the title of People's Artist of Russia. In 1990, he won three Nika Awards for Best Composer.

The Best Music prize at the largest Russian National Film Festival Kinotaur is named after Tariverdiev.

On 31 May 1990 Tariverdiev underwent cardiac surgery in the London Royal Hospital; his aortic valve was replaced with an artificial one. Upon his death in 1996, a group of admirers of his music founded the Mikael Tariverdiev Charity Fund and organized the Tariverdiev International Organ Competition.

In November 2015, the first major release of Tariverdiev's work in the West was published in London by Antique Beat and the UK label Earth Recordings, as a set of three albums titled 'Film Music'. The release was curated by Vera Tariverdieva, the composer's widow, and Stephen Coates of the UK band The Real Tuesday Weld, who had heard Tariverdiev's music in Moscow in 2011.

== Discography ==
The following works of Tariverdiev have been recorded:

- Night Pastimes (film music)
- Quo vadis? (Organ Symphony Chernobyl, 1st Organ Concerto Cassandra, Two Chorale Preludes)
- Moods (6 preludes from the cycle 10 chorale preludes imitating the old masters, 3rd Organ concerto, 10 preludes from the cycle Moods (organ transcription by Alexey Parchine))
- Remembering Venice (film music)
- Seventeen Moments of Spring (film music)
- The Irony of Fate (film music)
- I Am The Tree (monologues on Posenyan, Voznesensky, Svetlov, Ashkenazy poetry sung by author)
- Instrumentalnye kinokhity (Film Music Hits)
- Composer's interpretation of Jewish songs
- Prescience of love (20th Century Madrigals)
- Graf Cagliostro (opera comique)
- Mikael Tariverdiev's Avant-Garde (vocal cycles on Japan medieval poetry, Bella Akhmadulina, Leonid Martynov, Semyon Kirsanov, Mikhail Malishevsky)
- Nostalgia - Japan duo Hide-Hide performing Mikael Tariverdiev's music on classical Japanese instruments—shamisen and shakuhachi with orchestra.
- Vox Humana. Vocal cycles to verses by L. Martinov, B. Akhmadulina, Medieval Japanese poets "Watercolors", E. Vinokurov, M. Tsvetaeva, "Waiting" to the poem by R. Rojdestvenskie. Performers: Zara Dolukhanova (soprano), Nina Lebedeva (soprano), Maria Lemesheva (soprano), Nina Svetlanova (piano), Mikael Tariverdiev (piano), Orchestra of Boris Pokrovsky Chamber Music Theater (conductor – Vladimir Agronsky).

== List of compositions ==
Symphonic works

- 1956 Concerto for voice with orchestra
- The orchestra: 3,2,3(B.I-bass-cl); 4,3,3,1; kettledrums, triangle, side drum, cymbals, bass drum, tam-tam, piano, harp, voice, strings.
- 1982 Concerto No. 1 for violin with orchestra in three movements
- The first version for full symphonic orchestra:

The orchestra: 2,2,2,(B); 0; 2(C), 2(C),2,0; kettledrums, cymbals, triangle, side drum, tam-tam, tambourine, vibraphone, (xylophone), harpsichord, harp, violin-solo, strings

- The second version - for chamber orchestra:

The orchestra: 1,0,0,0; 0,0,0,0; kettledrums, vibraphone, (xylophone), harpsichord, violin-solo, strings.

- 1992 Concerto No. 2 for violin-solo with orchestra (in one part)
- The orchestra: 1,1,1,0; triangle, strings (10-12; 8-10; 6–8; 4–6; 2).
- 1993 Concerto in Romantic Style (Концерт в романтическом стиле) for viola and string orchestra (in one movement), Op. 102
- The orchestra: viola-solo, strings: (8; 6; 6; 6; 2).

The works for organ

- 1985 Concerto No. 1 for organ "Cassandra" in four parts
- 1988 Symphony for reciter "Chernobyl" in two parts: 1. "Zone", 2. "Quo vadis"
- 1988 Concerto No. 2 for organ. Polyphonic notebook in four parts.
- 1989 Concerto No. 3 for organ in four parts: 1."Reflections", 2."Moving", 3."Choral", 4."Walking in C-Major".
- 1995 Ten chorales for organ ("Imitation of Old Masters"). Dedicated to the Spanish Infanta Helen

Chamber-instrumental works

- 1953 Nine little novels for piano
- 1953 "Fleetingnesses" for piano
- 1953 Sonata for French horn and piano
- 1954 Trio No. 1 for piano, violin and cello
- 1955 Trio No. 2 for piano, violin and cello
- 1986 "Moods" – 24 pieces for piano

Chamber-vocal works

- 1955 Three romances to the verses by A. Isaakjan
  - 1. "A Plucked Rose has no Way Home"
  - 2. "Grave"
  - 3. "I Always Remember..."
- 1956 Three sonnets by Shakespeare
  - 1. "Mossy Marble of Stone Graves"
  - 2. "Oh, How Shall I Praise You"
  - 3. "Jaded by Toils"
- 1956 Three songs to the verses by V. Orlov
  - 1. Familiar song
  - 2. Golden Twilight
  - 3. A song over the telephone
- 1957 "Water-colours" – vocal cycle to the verses by medieval Japanese poets
  - 1. Struck the road
  - 2. The way to the capital
  - 3. Before the execution
  - 4. In the morning mist
  - 5. Dream
- 1958 Vocal cycle to the verses by V. Mayakovsky
  - 1. Could you..?
  - 2. Something about Petersburg
  - 3. Tricks of cloud
  - 4. Listen!
  - 5. Instead of a letter
- 1959 Three songs to the verses by S. Davydova
  - 1. A song about pigeons
  - 2. A road song
  - 3. A song about spring
- 1960 "Garden Ring" to the verses by S. Grebennikov and H. Dobronravov
- 1960 "Your Eyes Look Like New Car Headlights" to the verses by S. Kirsanov
- 1960 Three romances to the verses by S. Kirsanov
  - 1. Your pictures
  - 2. Round a white clothed table
  - 3. Come!
- 1961 It so happens to the verses by B. Gaikovich
- 1962 Vocal cycle to the verses by L. Martynov
  - 1. Night was falling
  - 2. Water
  - 3. Leaves
- 1963 Two songs to the verses by N. Dobronravov
  - 1. Don't be sad
  - 2. In the evenings
- 1963 Vocal cycle to the verses by Bella Akhmadulina
  - 1. An old romance
  - 2. I thought you were a doctor for me
  - 3. Fifteen boys
- 1964 Vocal cycle to the verses by Evgeny Vinokurov
  - 1. I was seizing sentiments
  - 2. Windows
  - 3. Your face is fading from my memory
- 1964 "Skirls" – vocal cycle to the verses by M. Malishevsky
  - 1. Sparrow – experimenter
  - 2. Monkey and mirror
  - 3. Self-respect
  - 4. Critics and bubbles
  - 5. Conversation
  - 6. In a rook-like way
  - 7. Nightingale and art counsel
- 1965 "Music" to the verses by V. Orlov
- 1966 "You are going away like a train" to the verses by E. Evtushenko
- 1967 Seven song-recitatives to the verses by G. Pozhenjan
  - 1. I am such a tree
  - 2. Dolphins
  - 3. It's birds' manner to fly away
  - 4. Pine-trees
  - 5. I would like ...
  - 6. I took a decision
  - 7. Soon you will be grown up
- 1967 "Farewell to Arms" - vocal cycle to the verses by E. Hemingway
  - 1. Footfall
  - 2. Way?
  - 3. Along wet earth
  - 4. Killed
  - 5. Did it ever happen to you?
  - 6. How night differs from day?
  - 7. Praise to Christmas
  - 8. We are spending what is not destined for it
  - 9. Love and compassion
  - 10. I rushed to you
  - 11. We carry love within us
  - 12. Ever alive
- 1968 "Little Prince" to the verses by N. Dobronravov
- 1969 Six vocal novels to the verses by L. Ashkenazi
  - 1. Radio
  - 2. Women
  - 3. Cigarettes
  - 4. I told her exactly this
  - 5. Light steam
  - 6. A song about new generation
- 1970 Songs to the verses by A. Voznesensky
  - 1. I want silence
  - 2. Grove
  - 3. Shall I stare at the train?
  - 4. Memory ("They Killed Poem")
  - 5. I am heading from the carriage platform
- 1971 Two romances to the verses by M. Tsvetaeva
  - 1. My darling, what have I done to you?
  - 2. Attempt at jealousy
- 1971 "I am Writing to You" to the verses by M. Lermontov
- 1972 Two songs to the verses by R. Rozhdestvensky
  - 1. Instants
  - 2. A song about remote Motherland
- 1974 Six songs to the verses by Soviet poets
  - 1. I like it (M. Tsvetaeva)
  - 2. No one will be at home (B. Posternak)
  - 3. At the mirror (M. Tsvetaeva)
  - 4. That's what happened to me (E. Evtushenko)
  - 5. I asked an ash-tree (V. Kirchov)
  - 6. Along my street (Bella Akhmadulina B. Akhmadulina)
- 1974 Vocal cycle to the verses by L. Martynov
  - 1. Night was falling
  - 2. Water
  - 3. Leaves
- 1974 Vocal cycle to the verses by A. Voznesensky
  - 1. I want silence
  - 2. Grove

Shall I stare at the train?

- 1974 Vocal cycle to the verses by M. Tsvetaeva
- 1975 Memory to the verses by D. Samoilov
- 1975 Don't disappear to the verses by A. Voznesensky
- 1975 Vocal cycle to the verses by S. Kirsanov
  - 1. Your eyes
  - 2. Your pictures
  - 3. At the white clothed table
  - 4. Come
- 1976 We are, comrade, with you – cycle of songs to the verses by M. Svetlov
  - 1. Red Guards from remote times
  - 2. Old Komsomol members song
  - 3. I was not a friend of hers
  - 4. Moscow Military district
  - 5. In the reconnaissance
  - 6. Infantry passing the bogs
  - 7. We are, comrade, with you
  - 8. Grenada
- 1977 "Echo" ("Don't return to ex-beloved") to the verses by A. Voznesensky
- 1977 A song about circus to the verses by B. Akhmadulina
- 1977 Old Komsomol members' songs to the verses by M. Svetlov
  - 1. Red Guards from remote times
  - 2. Old Komsomol members' song
  - 3. I was not a friend of hers
  - 4. Moscow Military district
  - 5. In the reconnaissance
  - 6. Infantry passing the bogs
  - 7. We are, comrade, with you
  - 8. Grenada
- 1979 "Remember this World". Vocal cycle to the verses by A. Voznesensky
  - 1. Twilights are frequent over the ploughed field
  - 2. Nostalgia for the present
  - 3. Thanks for not dying yesterday
  - 4. Remember this world
- 1980 Eight sonnets by Shakespeare
  - 1. I love
  - 2. Sonnet about a hen
  - 3. I am guilty
  - 4. Alas! My verse is not sparkling new
  - 5. Sonnet about an apple
  - 6. Love is blind and blinds us too
  - 7. To prevent two hearts' union
  - 8. Ardent heard at the dawn ...
- 1986 Five songs to the verses by M. Tsvetaeva
  - 1. Where has such tenderness come from?
  - 2. And again the window
  - 3. Island girl
  - 4. I don't need you anymore
  - 5. Should I forget it?

Music for theatre performance

- 1963 "Purpose" (Sovremennik)
- 1966 "Farewell to Arms" (Lenin's Komsomol theatre)
- 1966 "The Hero of our Time" (Theatre on the Taganka)
- 1968 "Farewell" (Mossoviet theatre)
- 1968 "Climbing the Fudzijama" (Sovremennik)

== Filmography ==
- 1957 "Our Fathers' Youth"
- 1958 "Save the Drowning Man"
- 1959 "Ten Steps to the East"
- 1961 "A Man Following the Sun"
- 1961 "My Junior Brother"
- 1962 "Goodbye! Boys"
- 1962 "Welcome, or No Trespassing"
- 1963 "The Big Ore"
- 1964 "To love"
- 1965 "Farewell
- 1966 "Wake up Mukhin"
- 1966 "The Last Swindler"
- 1967 "Save the Drowning Man"
- 1968 "King-deer"
- 1968 "Passenger from the "Equator""
- 1970 "Fixed-post Spy's Fate"
- 1972 "Seventeen Moments of Spring" (12 series)
- 1974 "Star Minute"
- 1974 "The Irony of Fate"
- 1975 "Olga Sergeevna" (8 series)
- 1976 "Disappeared Expedition" (2 series)
- 1978 "Out-of-date Comedy"
- 1980 "Adam Merries Eve" (2 series)
- 1989 "Endhouse Mysteries"
- 1990 "Monster"
- 1990 "Homonovus"
- 1991 "And the Wind Returns"
- 1993 "Russian Ragtime"
- 1995 "Summer People" ("Dachniki")

Works for musical theatre

- 1945 "On the Beach" - ballet in one act. Libretto by Shengelaja.
- 1945 "Interrogation" - ballet in one act. Libretto by G. Gelovani.
- 1965 "Who are you?" (opera for young people). Libretto by M. Churova on the motives of V. Aksenov's novel "Mandarines from Morocco" to the verses by A. Voznesensky, E. Vinokurov, E. Evtushenko, G. Pozhenjan, R. Rozhdestvensky, S. Kirsanov, M. L'vovsky.

The orchestra: piano 1, harpsichord (piano 2), ionika, elektroorga celesta, vibraphone, xylophone, elektro guitar 1, elektro guitar 2, batteria, double-basses.

- 1973 "Poem about happiness" – ballet in two acts. Libretto by V. Zakharov.
- 1981 "Count Kaliostro" – opera-buff. Libretto by N. Kemarsky to the motives of the same name novel by A. Tolstoy to the verses by A. Kemarsky and R. Sef.

The orchestra: 1,1,1,1; 2,1,1,0, vibraphone, xylophone, side drum, bass drum, whip, triangle, cymbals, harp, harpsichord, strings.

- 1985 "Gernika" – ballet in two acts to the motives P. Picasso's picture.

The orchestra: 1,1,1,1; 1,1,1,1; bells, xylophone, vibraphone, triangle, tambourine, tam-tam, bass drum, cymbals, harp, piano, strings.

- 1986 "Waiting" – mono-opera.

(There are two versions of the opera: for lyric soprano and for mezzo-soprano.) The orchestra: 1,1,0,1; 0,0,0,0; vibraphone, (xylophone), bells, triangle, tam-tam, kettle drums, harp, voice, strings.

- 1986 "A Girl and Death" – ballet in two acts to the motives of M. Gorky's tale A Girl and Death.

The orchestra: 2,2,2,2; 4(F), 3(B),3,1; kettle drums, chime-bells, xylophone, vibraphone, triangle, tambourine, side drum, castanets, cymbals, tam-tam, harp, piano, strings.

- 1992 "Figarienok's Marriage" – opera-grotesque to the motives of Bomarsher's work.

== Books ==
- «Я просто живу» (I Am Simply Living), autobiography, Moscow, Zebra, 2007
