= Antique Beat =

Antique Beat is an arts label created in 2006 by the English musician Stephen Coates of the band The Real Tuesday Weld and Nix Stewart. The name "Antique Beat" was originally used by Coates to describe the music he had been creating since the late 1990s which combined 1930s-styled jazz and electronica.

The label produces music, events and hand-made, limited edition merchandise by a variety of artists. The label has no connection with the later French easy-listening band "Beats Antique".

== Music ==
The label and its publishing arm catalogue includes repertoire by The Real Tuesday Weld, UK band Lazarus and the Plane Crash and the Russian film composer Mikael Tariverdiev.

== Events ==
Antique Beat produces and curates various arts and literary events including "Salon for the City", "32 Londoners" and "London Month of the Dead".

== Merchandise ==
The label commissions hand-made artwork and accessories by a range of artists and produces bespoke packaging for limited edition releases by The Real Tuesday Weld.
