= Hannah Courtoy =

English maid (1784–1849)

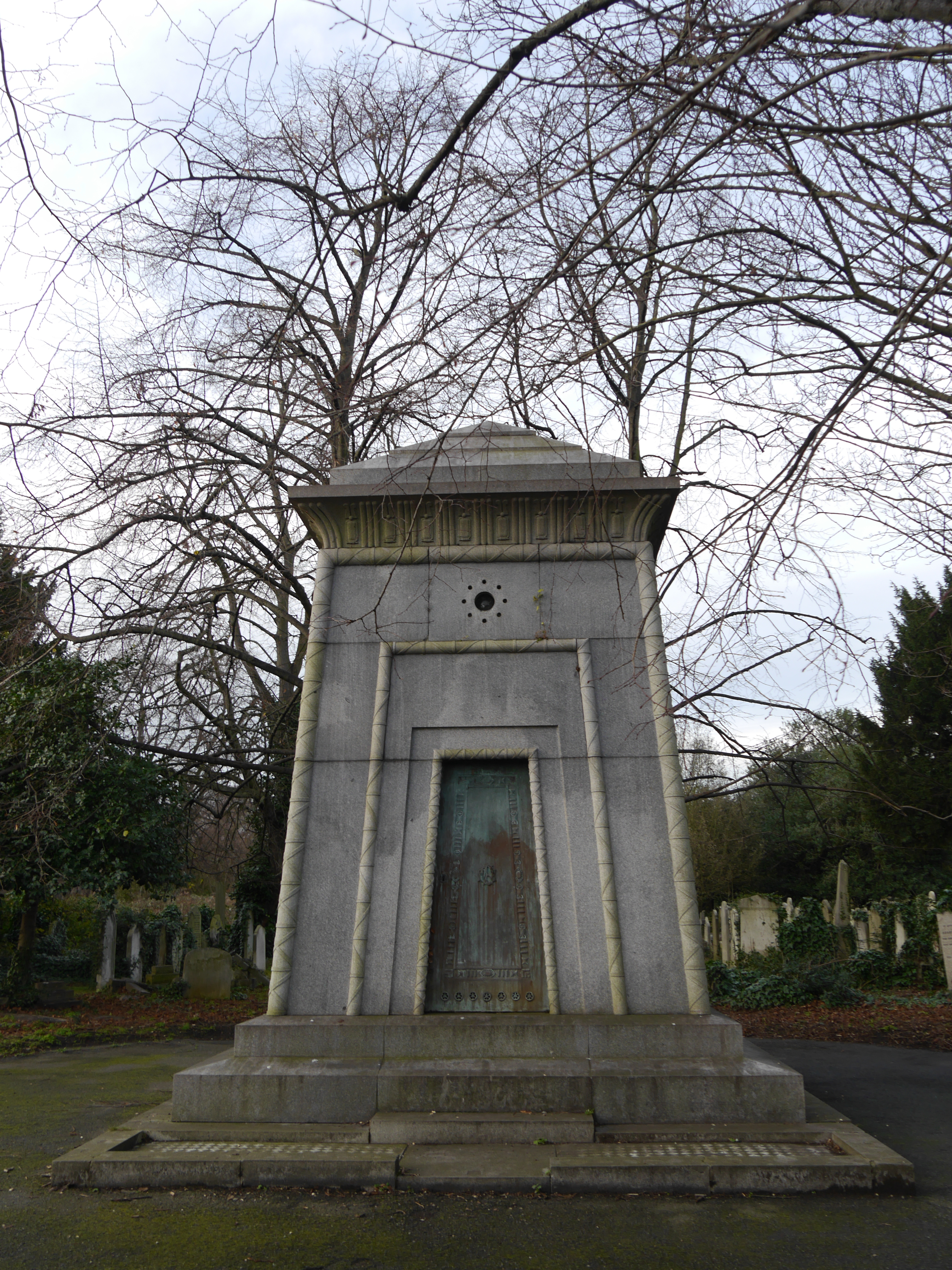
Hannah Courtoy mausoleum, Brompton Cemetery.

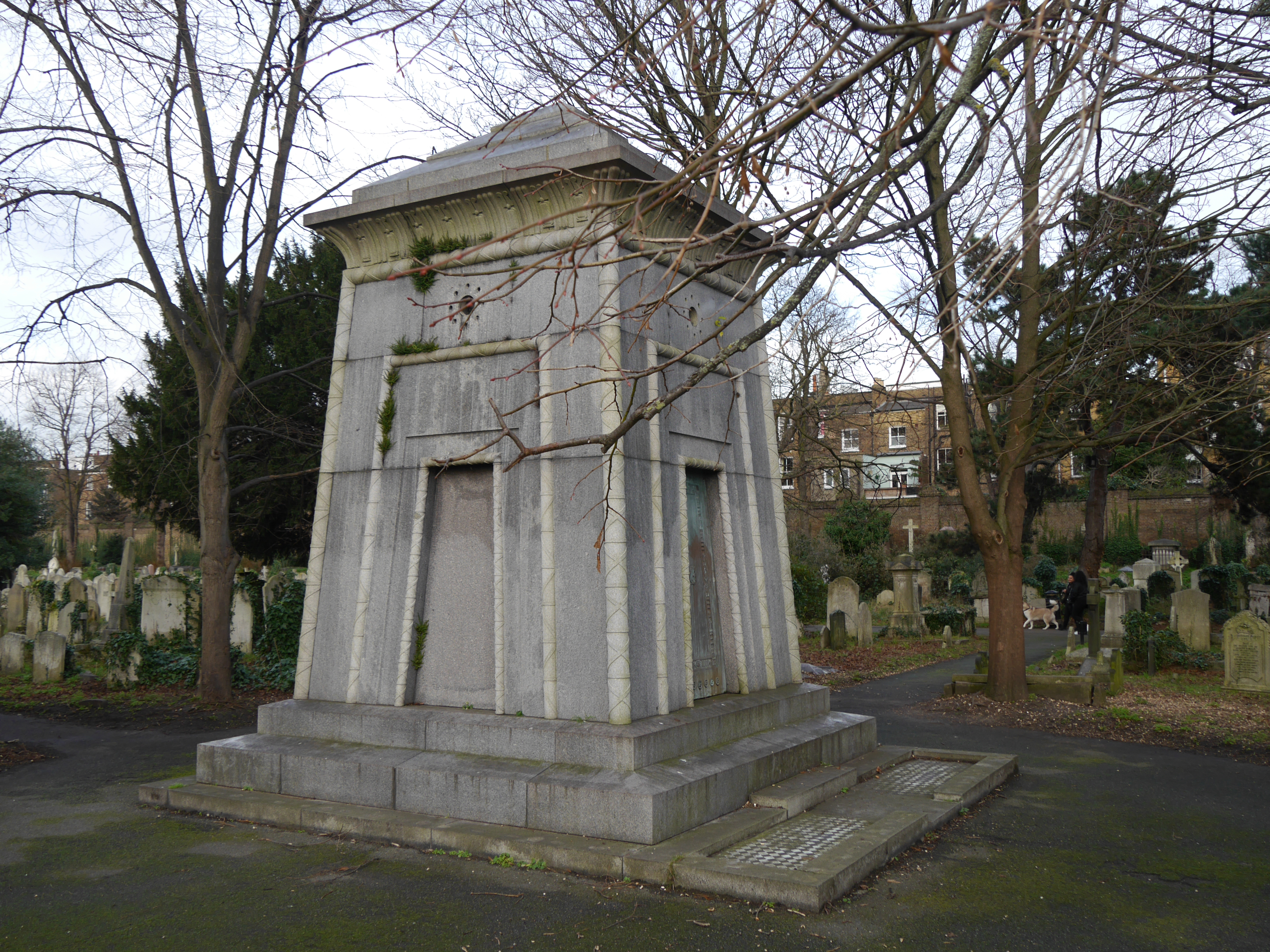
Courtoy Mausoleum.

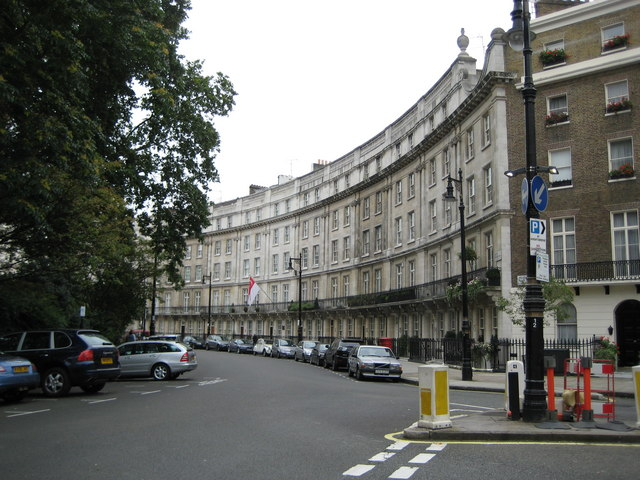
14 Wilton Crescent is to the right of the post box in the picture.

Hannah Courtoy (1784 - 26 January 1849), born Hannah Peters, was a London society woman who inherited a fortune from the merchant John Courtoy in 1815. Her distinctive Egyptian-style mausoleum in London's Brompton Cemetery has been the subject of considerable curiosity and speculation ever since a report by Reuters in 1998 repeated claims that it contained a working time machine.

== Life ==
Hannah Courtoy was born Hannah Peters in 1784, her occupation was a maid. She had three daughters out of wedlock with John Courtoy, Mary Ann (1801), Elizabeth (1804-1876), and Susannah (1807-1895). In 1830, Susannah married Septimus Holmes Godson, a barrister of Gray's Inn.

In 1815, Courtoy inherited a fortune from the elderly merchant John Courtoy (born Nicholas Jacquinet in France, 1729) through a Will that was disputed in court.

== Death ==
Courtoy died on 26 January 1849, at 14 Wilton Crescent, Belgrave Square, one of the most expensive areas of London. Her Will is held in the British National Archives.

== Tomb ==
Courtoy's distinctive Egyptian-style mausoleum of 1854 in Brompton Cemetery, where her unmarried daughters Elizabeth and Mary Ann are also interred, has been the subject of considerable curiosity because of rumours that it might be or contain a working time machine, a speculation that has been fuelled by various articles and recordings made by the musician Stephen Coates of the band The Real Tuesday Weld

The Egyptologist Joseph Bonomi the Younger is buried nearby.

== See also ==
- Samuel Alfred Warner
