= The Death of Quickspace =

The Death Of Quickspace

Studio album by Quickspace
- Released: March 21, 2000
- Recorded: 1999–2000
- Genre: Space rock, krautrock, noise pop, experimental rock
- Length: 44:45
- Label: Kitty Kitty; Matador
- Producer: Tom Cullinan

Quickspace chronology
Precious Falling (1998)	The Death Of Quickspace (2000)

Professional ratings
Review scores
Source	Rating
AllMusic	4/5 stars
The Encyclopedia of Popular Music	3/5 stars
NME	3.5/5 stars
Pitchfork	8.3/10
Rolling Stone	3/5 stars
Select	3/5 stars

The Death Of Quickspace is the third and final album released by Quickspace. It was released in 2000.

== Production ==
The album was written in the studio and recorded live. It was produced by frontman Tom Cullinan.

== Critical reception ==
NME wrote that "it seems Tom Cullinan‘s Krautrock disciples have hit upon a motorik El Dorado – a place where tedium is transcended by zealous determination, and glacial repetition becomes a thing of hushed and haunted beauty." Ox-Fanzine deemed the album "a really good record with a pop character here, occasionally spiced up with sawing guitars." Billboard wrote: "A bizarre semi-song cycle of fuzzed-out guitars and warbling strings that loops back on itself on multiple occasions, The Death Of Quickspace is anything but easily digestible." The Sunday Times called the album "weird but wonderful," writing that "the smothering bass and protracted noodlings give way to something more fractured, culminating in the ceilidh-in-a-Munich- bierkeller brutality of the gloriously brusque closer, '4'."

== Track listing ==
1. "The Lobbalong Song" – 4:11
2. "They Shoot Horse, Don't They?" – 7:33
3. "Climbing A Hill" – 11:03
4. "Munchers, No Munchers" – 3:26
5. "Gloriana" – 5:59
6. "The Munchers" – 3:15
7. "A Rose" – 6:15
8. "Lob It" – 2:29
9. "4" – 0:31
