= William Godson =

William Godson (1766 – 19 August 1822) was an attorney in Tenbury, Worcestershire, and elected one of the county's coroners in 1809.

His wife was Margaret Probyn (1766–1832). His son Richard Godson (1797–1849) was member of parliament for St Albans in 1831-32 and then Kidderminster 1832-34 and 1837–1849. His son, Septimus Holmes Godson (1799–1877), was a British barrister who was called to the bar at Gray's Inn in 1837. His son Stephen practised as an attorney at Worcester and died 9 June 1839.
