= Bathtime in Clerkenwell =

- Directed by: Alex Budovsky
- Written by: Alex Budovsky
- Music by: Stephen Coates
- Release date: 2002
- Running time: 3 minutes
- Country: United States

External videos
- Bathtime in Clerkenwell on YouTube

Bathtime in Clerkenwell is a 2002 animated short film written and directed by Alex Budovsky. The film was inspired by the song of the same title composed by Stephen Coates and performed by The Real Tuesday Weld.

== Awards ==
Year	Presenter/festival	Award/category	Status
2004	Sundance Film Festival	Online Film Festival Viewers Award	Won
2004	Ottawa International Animation Festival	Non-Narrative Short Film Under 35 Minutes	Won
2004	Florida Film Festival	Grand Jury Award for Best Animated Short	Won
