= Comes with a Smile =

Former British music-focused fanzine

Comes with a Smile was a quarterly music-focused fanzine published in the United Kingdom between June 1997 and February 2006. The title originates from a lyric in Red House Painters' song "24".

In 2001, Comes with a Smile released a now-out-of-print split 7-inch between the bands Arco and Rivulets. Catalog number (KWOZ01).

From issue 5 onward, the magazine included a cover CD containing rare and often otherwise unavailable tracks by most of the artists interviewed within the magazine.

== Personnel ==
- Matt Dornan - Editor
- Paul Heartfield - Photography
- Clive Painter - Mastering Engineer
- Mark Venn - Publisher

== Contributors ==
- Ian Fletcher
- LD Beghtol
- Greg Weeks
- Jamie Lynn
- Martin Williams
- Mariko Sakamoto
- Jennifer Nine
- Stav Sherez
- Mike Agate
- James Hindle
- Wyndham Wallace
- Adrian Pannett
- Mike Diver
- Jane Oriel
- Allie Roxburgh
- Simon Berkovitch
- Laurence Arnold
- Mark Walton
- Tom Sheriff
- Stephen Raywood
- Matt Thorne
- Sarah Corbett
- Mary MacDowell
- Stephen Ridley
- Maike Zimmermann
- many more
