= Richard Godson =

English barrister and politician

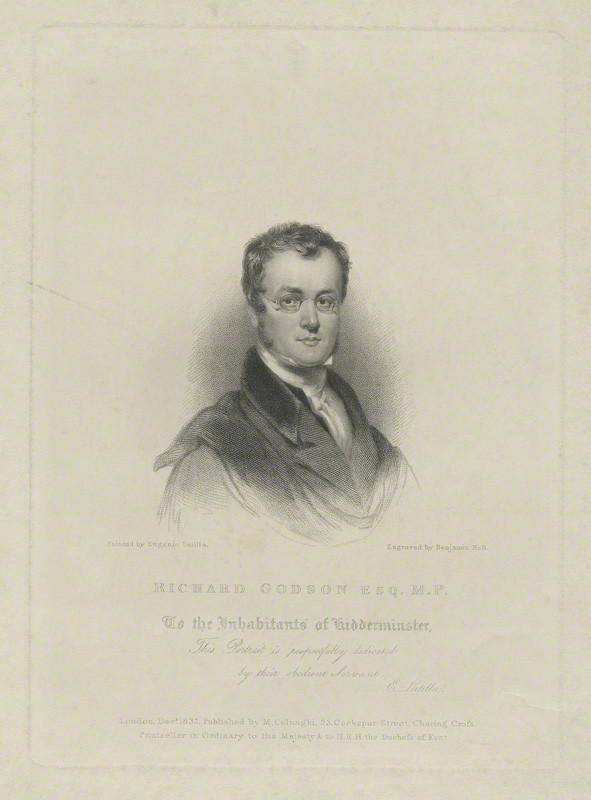
Richard Godson, 1832 engraving

Richard Godson, QC (1797–1849) was an English barrister and politician. He was member of Parliament for St Albans in 1831–32 and then Kidderminster 1832–34 and 1837–1849. His father was William Godson of Worcester who died in 1822. His brothers were Septimus Holmes Godson, barrister, and Stephen Godson, attorney. Godson's relationship with Kidderminster began when he defended carpet-weavers on trial there in 1830. In 1835, following the abolition of slavery, Godson received compensation for enslaved persons associated with the Pusey Hall Estate in Jamaica. He had declared this "embarrassment" openly while campaigning, during which time he supported both the First Reform Bill and emancipation.
