= Goodson =

Goodson is an English surname. Notable people with the surname include:

- Adrienne Goodson (born 1966), American basketball player
- Alfred Goodson (1867–1940), British businessman and public servant
- Barbara Goodson (born 1949), American voice actress
- Clarence Goodson (born 1982), American soccer player
- Don Goodson (1932–2010), English cricketer
- Ed Goodson (born 1948), American baseball player
- Ida Goodson (1909–2000), American classic female blues and jazz singer and pianist
- Ivor Goodson (born 1943), British educationalist
- Jonathan Goodson (born 1945), American television producer
- Katharine Goodson (1872–1958), English pianist
- Kenneth E. Goodson (born 1967), American engineer
- Len Goodson (1880−1922), English footballer
- Mark Goodson (1915–1992), American television producer
- Patricia Goodson, American concert pianist
- Tyler Goodson (born 2000), American football player
- William Goodsonn (1610–c. 1680), English vice-admiral in the Royal Navy

== Fictional characters ==
- Joel Goodson, fictional character in the film Risky Business, played by Tom Cruise

== See also ==
- Charles Goodson-Wickes (born 1945), British politician
- Patricia Timmons-Goodson (born 1954), American judge
