= Monograph (band) =

- Origin: London, England
- Genres: Indie rock
- Years active: 1995–2000
- Label: Shinkansen Recordings

Monograph were a London-based indie rock band that began recording music in 1995 and broke up in 2000.

Monograph released one album and three singles on Matt Haynes' (ex-Sarah Records) Shinkansen Recordings label between 1998 and 2000. Their vocalist and guitarist, Rob Crutchley, was also the main songwriter and their records were produced by Broken Dog's guitarist Clive Painter, with that band's Martine Roberts also guesting on several songs. A self-titled mini-album was issued under the alias Pacific Radio in 2000, while a subsequent album entitled 'Everything Is in the Past' remains unreleased. Early supporters of the band included Steve Lamacq, Gideon Coe and Sean Hughes. The BBC Radio 1 DJ John Peel played songs from each of their releases and the band recorded a Peel session in 1999 (the first act on the Shinkansen roster to do so). Rob also took part in two live John Peel Christmas Specials with Broken Dog at Maida Vale and Peel Acres.

== Members ==
- Rob Crutchley
- Gethyn Jordan
- Steve McNairn
- Surain Lokuge

Guest musicians

- Martine Roberts – Broken Dog
- Clive Painter – Broken Dog

== Discography ==
=== Albums ===
- Lorelei (Shinkansen Recordings), (1999)
- Pacific Radio – Pacific Radio (Shinkansen Recordings), (2000)

=== Singles ===
- "Paper Museum" (Shinkansen Recordings), (1998)
- "Please Don’t Be Afraid of Anything" (Shinkansen Recordings), (1999)
- "Don't Gimme Shelter" (Shinkansen Recordings), (1999)

=== Compilation albums ===
- Lights on a Darkening Shore (Shinkansen Recordings), (2000)
- Christmas EP (Shinkansen Recordings), (2000)
- Someone To Share My Life With (But Is It Art), (2006)
- Other Futures Shine Like Stars in Other People's Eyes (Shinkansen Recordings), (2017)
