= Quickspace =

British experimental rock band

- Also known as: Quickspace Supersport
- Origin: London, England
- Genres: Indie rock; post-rock; indie pop; psychedelia; krautrock
- Years active: 1994–2005
- Labels: Kitty Kitty, Matador, Love Train, Elefant Records, Slash, Hidden Agenda, Domino, Homesleep
- Spinoff of: Th' Faith Healers
- Past members: Tom Cullinan; Sean Newsham; Ed Grimshaw; Louis Jack-Jones; Roxanne Stephen; Wendy Harper (also known as Tiana Harper); Max Corradi; Barry Stillwell; Chin; Steve Denton; Nina Pascale; Paul Shilton; Robin C.

Quickspace (originally Quickspace Supersport) was an English indie rock band active between 1994 and 2005, led by vocalist and guitarist Tom Cullinan.

== History ==
Shortly after the breakup of his indie group Th' Faith Healers, Tom Cullinan formed Quickspace Supersport with Sean Newsham (bass), Wendy Harper (vocals/guitar), Max Corradi (drums), and Barry Stillwell (keyboards) in London at the end of 1994. They released their debut single, "Quickspace Happy Song #1" in March 1995 on their Kitty Kitty Corporation label. Their music retained the repetitive propulsive style of Th' Faith Healers, but with stronger influences from post-punk, krautrock and space rock, among other styles of music, that led them to be regarded as post-rock. They found friends in bands such as Sebadoh and Stereolab, both of whom they toured the UK with later that year. A second single, "Found A Way", was released on the Love Train label, and the band subsequently released the "Superplus" EP on Domino in October 1995. A session was also recorded for the John Peel Show on BBC Radio 1.

Quickspace went into a brief hiatus when three of the original members left after disagreements over labels and money; the "Supersport" part of the name was dropped and Cullinan reformed the band, with Nina Pascale (vocals/guitar), Paul Shilton (keyboards), and Chin (drums). A re-recorded version of "Friend" was the first single with the new line-up, released in early 1996 on the Kitty Kitty label. Their first album, Quickspace, was released in autumn 1996, and featuring a mix of old and new recordings. A US version released in 1997 added the two most recent singles.

In spring 1997, a collection of their early singles and rare tracks was released on the low-priced compilation SupoSpot. It was followed later that year by The "Precious Mountain" EP. In the Summer of 1998 the band released the "Hadid" and "Quickspace Happy Song #2" singles and combined them both on the "Precious Little EP" CD. The band also re-recorded a version of "Friend" in Spanish for release as a single on Elefant Records. Chin left the band during this year and was replaced by Steve Denton. Their second album Precious Falling was released on CD and double vinyl in August 1998.

In 2000, the band released The Death of Quickspace to critical approval, followed by the "Flat Moon Society" single later that year. Tom Cullinan later released a complete cover of Fleetwood Mac's Rumours under the pseudonym Dougal Reed, but no new Quickspace songs materialised for over three years.

In 2003, the single "In a Field of Nymphs" was released on the Italian Homesleep label, but it would take two more years until a completely renewed Quickspace featuring Cullinan, Ed Grimshaw (drums), Louis Jack-Jones (bass) and ex-Th' Faith Healer Roxanne Stephen (vocals) released their next single "Pissed Off Boy" on the Domino label in 2005. After this Cullinan reformed Th' Faith Healers for some concerts in early 2006 but there has been no further activity under the Quickspace name since.

== Discography ==
Main albums

- Quickspace (1996)
- Precious Falling (1998)
- The Death of Quickspace (2000)

Compilations

- SupoSpot (1997)

Singles & EPs

- Quickspace Happy Song #1 (1995)
- Found A Way (1995)
- Superplus (1995)
- Friend (1995)
- Rise (1996)
- Amigo (1997)
- Precious Mountain (1997)
- Hadid (1998)
- Quickspace Happy Song #2 (1998)
- Precious Little EP (1998)
- The Lobbalong Song (1999)
- The Flat Moon Society (2000)
- In A Field Of Nymphs (2003)
- Pissed Off Boy (2005)
