= Glen Duncan =

British author

Glen Duncan is a British author born in 1965 in Bolton, Lancashire, England to an Anglo-Indian family. He is the author of over a dozen novels and was named one of 20 best young novelists by the The Times Literary Supplement.

== Early life and education ==
Glen Duncan grew up in an Anglo-Indian family in Bolton, Lancashire. As the last of four children, he was the only one to be born in the United Kingdom. He went to local Catholic primary and secondary schools before studying philosophy and literature at the universities of Lancaster and Exeter.

In 1982, Duncan was caught in an electrical storm on Salisbury Plain that reminded him of his Roman Catholicism. In 1990 Duncan moved to London, where he worked as a bookseller for four years, writing in his spare time. In 1994 he visited India with his father (part roots odyssey, part research for a later work, The Bloodstone Papers) before travelling to the United States, where he spent several months travelling the country by Amtrak train, writing much of what would become his first novel, Hope, published to critical acclaim on both sides of the Atlantic in 1997. He has described Martin Amis and Don DeLillo as two of his biggest influences.

== Work ==
Duncan's novel I, Lucifer was published in 2002 and shortlisted for the Geoffrey Faber Memorial Prize. The premise of the book is that Lucifer has been given a month to live in mortal form to get himself back into God's good graces before the end of the world. The film rights have been sold. The book was provided with a "soundtrack" by Duncan's longtime friend Stephen Coates and his band The Real Tuesday Weld, a cross-platform collaboration repeated for Duncan's book The Last Werewolf. The pair have toured and performed at various live events and festivals together including at the British Film Institute. After telling his agent, on a whim, to pitch The Last Werewolf as the first in a trilogy, he found himself having to write two additional books without a plan for how to continue them.

In 2013, Glen Duncan took the pseudonym of Saul Black to publish a thriller, The Killing Lessons, in 2015.

== Reception ==
According to critic William Skidelsky in The Observer, Duncan "specialises in writing novels that can't easily be pigeon-holed". Similarly, David Robson in The Daily Telegraph has noted that Duncan is "an idiosyncratic talent", adding,"You never know quite which way he is going to turn." Salon described A Day and a Night and a Day as the "darkest and most convincing account of the idiocies, insights and horrors of the 'war on terror' that I've yet read". The Times Literary Supplement named him one of its "20 best young novelists.

== Bibliography ==
- Hope (1997)
- Love Remains (2000)
- I, Lucifer (2002)
- Weathercock (2003)
- Death of an Ordinary Man (2004)
- The Bloodstone Papers (2006)
- A Day And A Night And A Day (2009)
- The Last Werewolf (April 2011)
- Talulla Rising (June 2012)
- By Blood We Live (February 2014)

=== Valerie Hart series ===
Published under the pseudonym Saul Black:

- The Killing Lessons (2015)
- LoveMurder (2016)
- Anything for You (2019)
