= I, Lucifer (Duncan novel) =

2002 novel by Glen Duncan

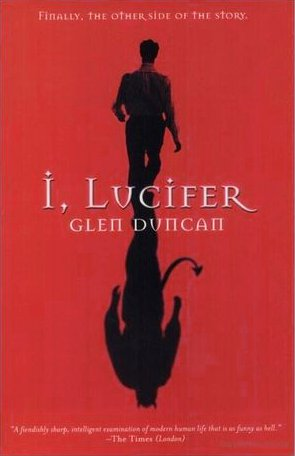
- First Edition Cover
- Author: Glen Duncan
- Language: English
- Genre: Supernatural fiction
- Publisher: Scribner (UK); Grove Press (US)
- Publication date: 2002
- Media type: Print
- Pages: 272
- ISBN: 0-8021-4014-9
- OCLC: 51631568

I, Lucifer is a 2002 novel by Glen Duncan, told from the point of view of the eponymous fallen angel, who has taken on a human body formerly belonging to a struggling writer. It was first published in the United Kingdom and Australia by Scribner, and later in the United States by Grove Press.

== Plot summary ==
In I, Lucifer, God presents the devil with a chance of redemption by living a somewhat sinless life in a human body. Lucifer, not wanting redemption, takes God's offer for a trial but instead takes it as a month's holiday. This story takes place in London and Lucifer lives in the body of Declan Gunn (an anagram of "Glen Duncan", the author's name), formerly a struggling writer who is suicidal. While in Declan's body, Lucifer takes his body for granted and abuses drugs, alcohol, and sex. Not only does Lucifer still live a devilish life, but also he starts to realize what being a human is really like. He realizes there is so much going on in their lives and so much temptation, and people can't simply do whatever they please. As Lucifer's trial is coming to an end, he receives a visit from the angel Raphael, who attempts to help Lucifer head in the right direction. Raphael tells him the world is going to end so there's no choice but to gain redemption from rebelling against God and be accepted back into heaven. Lucifer makes his decision. The whole story is permeated by the main character's versions of biblical episodes and his disparaging opinions about God and "Jimmeny" (Jesus).

== Music ==
A soundtrack album for the novel was released by The Real Tuesday Weld. The album is also called I, Lucifer. Glen Duncan was staying in Clerkenwell with Stephen Coates of The Real Tuesday Weld while writing the novel, and so "the book and record grew up together". In their cover of ABBA's "The Day Before You Came" the band changed the lyric of the third verse which references writer Marilyn French to reference Declan Gunn, the fictional writer in the book.

The 2003 Biffy Clyro album, The Vertigo of Bliss, takes its name from one of Lucifer's musings in I, Lucifer. The first track on the album is named "Bodies in Flight", which is similar to the title of a novel written by Declan Gunn, the author in the book.

Destroy the Runner's 2008 album is also named I, Lucifer.
