= List of Night Ranger members =

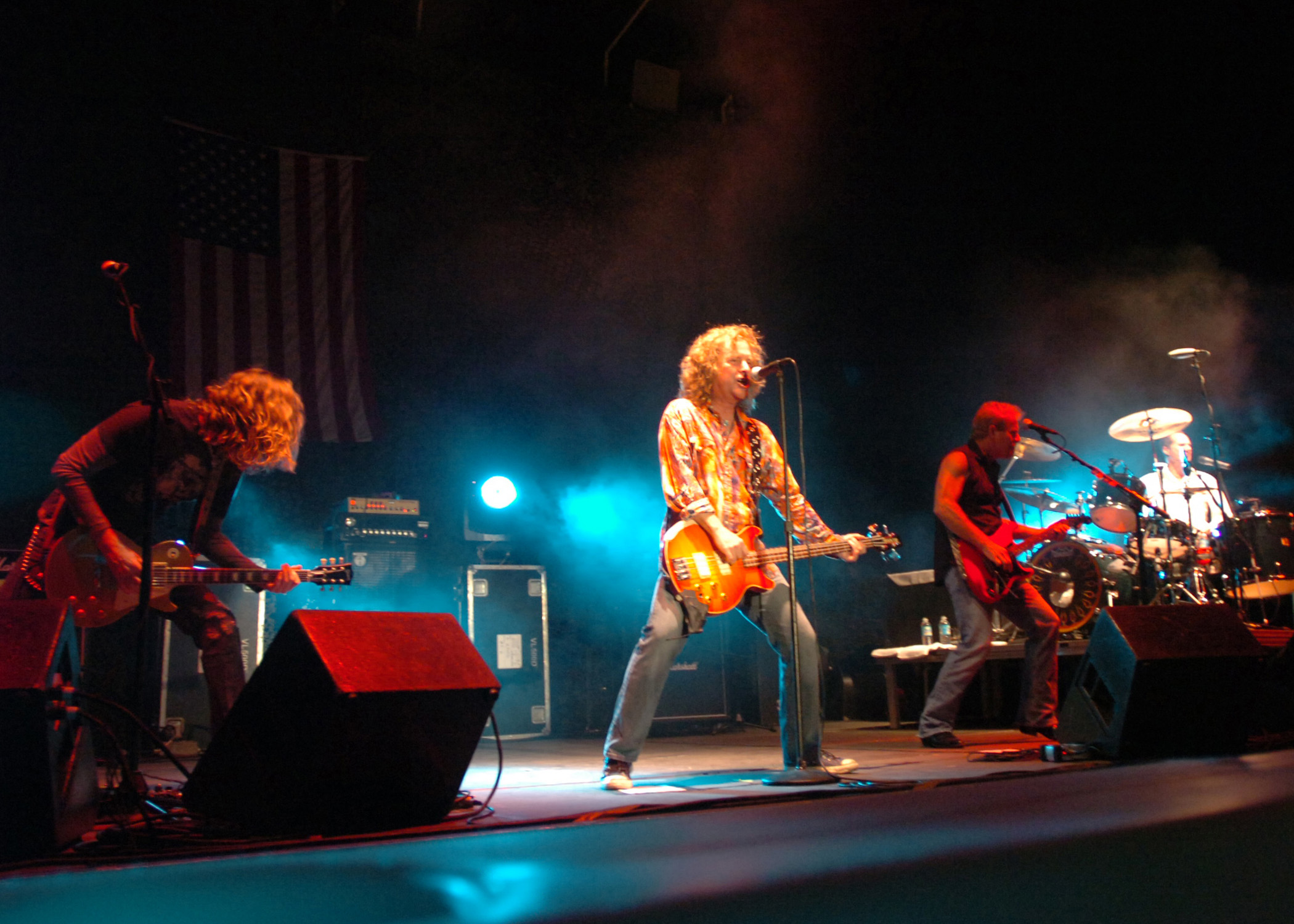
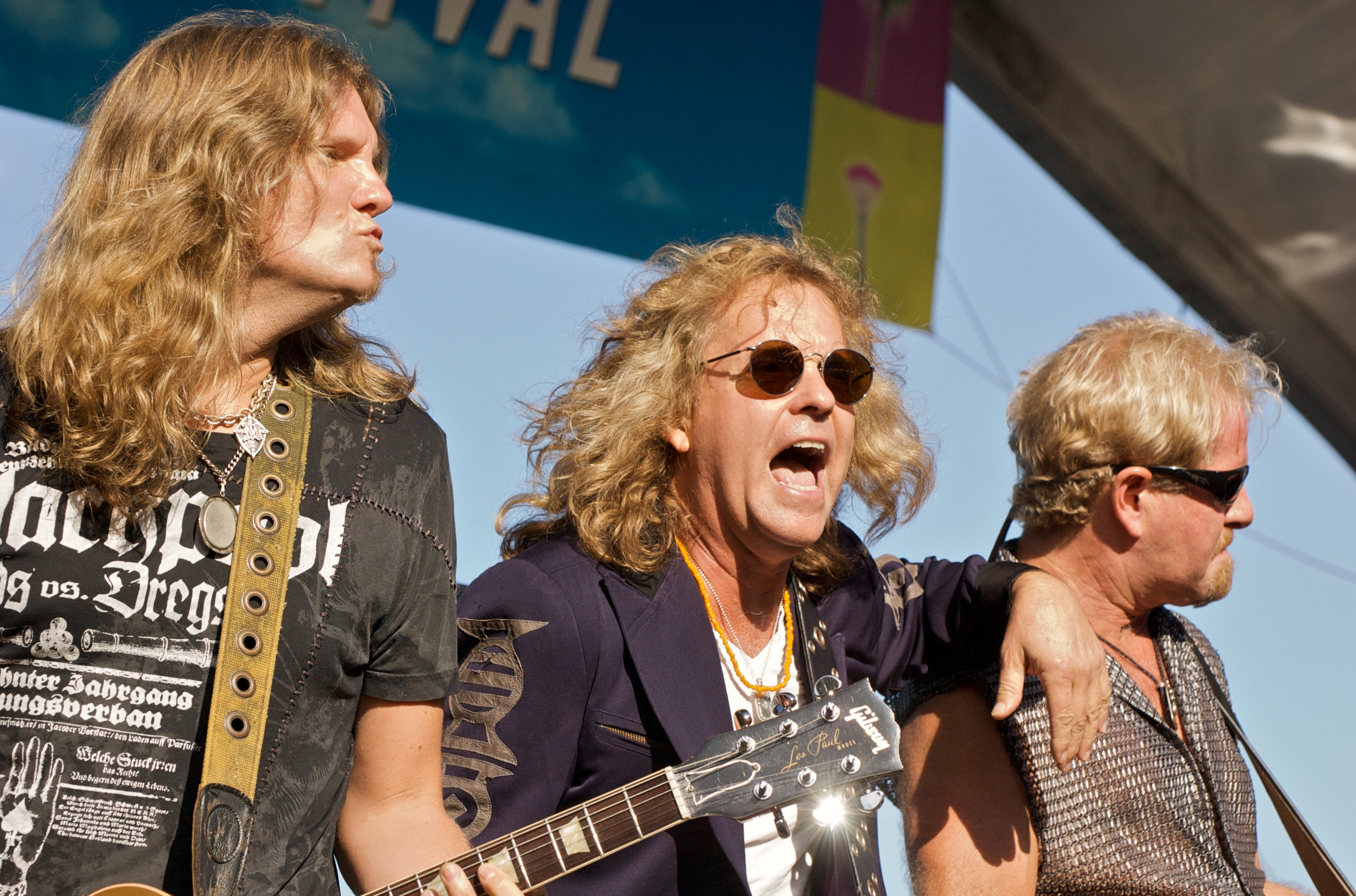
Members of Night Ranger performing live in 2008 (top) and 2009 (bottom).

Night Ranger is an American hard rock band from San Francisco, California. Formed in 1979 under the name "Stereo", the group was originally a trio composed of former Rubicon members Jack Blades (bass, lead vocals), Kelly Keagy (drums, lead vocals) and Brad Gillis (guitar, backing vocals). In 1980, the group expanded to a five-piece with the addition of keyboardist Alan Fitzgerald and second guitarist Jeff Watson, as well as changing its name to "Ranger" and later Night Ranger. After four commercially successful albums, the band experienced its first lineup change in early 1988 when Fitzgerald left prior to the recording of Man in Motion. Jesse Bradman, one of the substitute performers on the album, subsequently joined the group full-time. After Blades announced his departure, Night Ranger officially broke up in April 1989.

Two years after disbanding, Night Ranger was reformed by Keagy and Gillis, who recruited Gary Moon as the replacement for Blades. In 1993, David Zajicek joined the band as touring guitarist and keyboardist. Following the release and touring of Feeding off the Mojo, Blades, Watson and Fitzgerald all returned to mark a reunion of the original five-piece lineup of Night Ranger, after being invited to tour Japan. Two more studio albums followed, before Fitzgerald was replaced in 2003 by Michael Lardie of Great White. Watson also left in April 2007, with Whitesnake's Reb Beach taking his place for subsequent tour dates. Following a Japanese tour shortly after Beach's arrival, Lardie was replaced by Christian Matthew Cullen. In January 2008, Joel Hoekstra joined the band full-time, as Beach returned to Whitesnake.

Following the addition of Hoekstra, the Night Ranger lineup remained stable for three years, until Eric Levy replaced Cullen on keyboards in March 2011. Hoekstra remained for two studio albums and one live release, before it was announced in August 2014 that he was leaving to join Beach in Whitesnake. He was soon replaced by Keri Kelli, who had previously substituted for Hoekstra during shows in 2012 and 2013.

== Members ==
=== Current ===
Image	Name	Years active	Instruments	Release contributions
	Kelly Keagy	1979–1989; 1991–present	drums; percussion; lead and backing vocals	all Night Ranger releases
	Brad Gillis	1979–1989; 1991–present	lead and rhythm guitars; backing vocals	all Night Ranger releases
	Jack Blades	1979–1989; 1996–present	bass; lead and backing vocals; acoustic and rhythm guitars	all Night Ranger releases, except Feeding off the Mojo (1995)
	Eric Levy	2011–present	keyboards; synthesizers; piano; backing vocals	all Night Ranger releases from Somewhere in California (2011) onwards
	Keri Kelli	2014–present (plus select shows in 2012 and 2013)	lead and rhythm guitars; backing vocals	35 Years and a Night in Chicago (2016); Don't Let Up (2017); ATBPO (2021)

=== Former ===
Image	Name	Years active	Instruments	Release contributions
	Jeff Watson	1980–1989; 1996–2007	lead and rhythm guitars; keyboards; backing vocals	all releases from Dawn Patrol (1982) to Live in Japan (1990), and from Neverland (1997) to Hole in the Sun (2007)
	Alan Fitzgerald	1980–1988; 1996–2003	keyboards; synthesizers; piano; backing vocals	all releases from Dawn Patrol (1982) to Big Life (1987), and from Neverland (1997) to Seven (1998)
	Jesse Bradman	1988–1989	keyboards; synthesizers; piano; backing vocals	Man in Motion (1988); Live in Japan (1990)
	Gary Moon	1991–1996	bass; lead and backing vocals	Feeding off the Mojo (1995)
	Michael Lardie	2003–2007	keyboards; synthesizers; piano; backing vocals	Hole in the Sun (2007); Rockin' Shibuya 2007 (2008)
	Christian Matthew Cullen	2007–2011	keyboards; synthesizers; piano; backing vocals	none
	Joel Hoekstra	2008–2014	lead and rhythm guitars; backing vocals	Somewhere in California (2011); 24 Strings and a Drummer (2012); High Road (2014)

=== Touring ===
Image	Name	Years active	Instruments	Details
	David Zajicek	1993–1996 (died 2016)	rhythm guitar; keyboards; backing vocals	Zajicek joined Night Ranger's touring lineup in 1993, as well as contributing guitar to Feeding off the Mojo.
	Reb Beach	2007–2008	lead and rhythm guitars; backing vocals	After Watson was fired, Beach replaced him in the band for 2007 dates, appearing on Rockin' Shibuya 2007.
	Deen Castronovo	2011; 2017	drums; percussion; backing and lead vocals	Castronovo substituted for Keagy in 2011, and again during 2017 after the drummer had a heart operation.
	Brandon Ethridge	2012	keyboards; synthesizers; piano; backing vocals	Ethridge substituted for Levy for one show on September 1, 2012, as his wife was giving birth.
	Fred Coury	2017	drums	Coury substituted for Keagy alongside Castronovo, while the regular drummer was recovering from surgery.

== Lineups ==
Period	Members	Releases
1979–1980	Jack Blades – bass, lead vocals; Kelly Keagy – drums, percussion, lead vocals; Brad Gillis – guitar, backing vocals	none – live performances only
1980	Jack Blades – bass, lead vocals; Kelly Keagy – drums, percussion, lead vocals; Brad Gillis – guitar, backing vocals; Alan Fitzgerald – keyboards, backing vocals	none – live performances only
1980 – early 1988	Jack Blades – bass, lead vocals; Kelly Keagy – drums, percussion, lead vocals; Brad Gillis – guitar, backing vocals; Jeff Watson – guitar, backing vocals; Alan Fitzgerald – keyboards, backing vocals	Dawn Patrol (1982); Midnight Madness (1983); Japan Tour '83 (1984); 7 Wishes (1985); 7 Wishes Tour (1986); Big Life (1987)
Early – mid-1988	Jack Blades – bass, lead vocals; Kelly Keagy – drums, percussion, lead vocals; Brad Gillis – guitar, backing vocals; Jeff Watson – guitar, keyboards, backing vocals	Man in Motion (1988)
Late 1988 – April 1989	Jack Blades – bass, lead vocals; Kelly Keagy – drums, percussion, lead vocals; Brad Gillis – guitar, backing vocals; Jeff Watson – guitar, backing vocals; Jesse Bradman – keyboards, backing vocals	Live in Japan (1990)
Band inactive April 1989 – mid-1991
Mid-1991 – mid-1996	Gary Moon – bass, lead vocals; Kelly Keagy – drums, percussion, lead vocals; Brad Gillis – guitar, backing vocals	Feeding off the Mojo (1995)
June 1996 – early 2003	Jack Blades – bass, guitar, lead vocals; Kelly Keagy – drums, percussion, lead vocals; Brad Gillis – guitar, backing vocals; Jeff Watson – guitar, backing vocals; Alan Fitzgerald – keyboards, backing vocals	Neverland (1997); Rock in Japan '97 (1997); Seven (1998)
Early 2003 – April 2007	Jack Blades – bass, guitar, lead vocals; Kelly Keagy – drums, percussion, lead vocals; Brad Gillis – guitar, backing vocals; Jeff Watson – guitar, backing vocals; Michael Lardie – keyboards, backing vocals	Hole in the Sun (2007)
April – June 2007	Jack Blades – bass, guitar, lead vocals; Kelly Keagy – drums, percussion, lead vocals; Brad Gillis – guitar, backing vocals; Reb Beach – guitar, backing vocals (touring); Michael Lardie – keyboards, backing vocals	Rockin' Shibuya 2007 (2008)
June 2007 – January 2008	Jack Blades – bass, guitar, lead vocals; Kelly Keagy – drums, percussion, lead vocals; Brad Gillis – guitar, backing vocals; Reb Beach – guitar, backing vocals (touring); Christian M. Cullen – keyboards, backing vocals	none – live performances only
January 2008 – March 2011	Jack Blades – bass, guitar, lead vocals; Kelly Keagy – drums, percussion, lead vocals; Brad Gillis – guitar, backing vocals; Joel Hoekstra – guitar, backing vocals; Christian M. Cullen – keyboards, backing vocals	none – live performances only
March 2011 – August 2014	Jack Blades – bass, guitar, lead vocals; Kelly Keagy – drums, percussion, lead vocals; Brad Gillis – guitar, backing vocals; Joel Hoekstra – guitar, backing vocals; Eric Levy – keyboards, backing vocals	Somewhere in California (2011); 24 Strings and a Drummer (2012); High Road (2014)
September 2014 – present	Jack Blades – bass, guitar, lead vocals; Kelly Keagy – drums, percussion, lead vocals; Brad Gillis – guitar, backing vocals; Keri Kelli – guitar, backing vocals; Eric Levy – keyboards, backing vocals	35 Years and a Night in Chicago (2016); Don't Let Up (2017); ATBPO (2021)
