= Night Ranger discography =

Cataloging of published recordings by Night Ranger

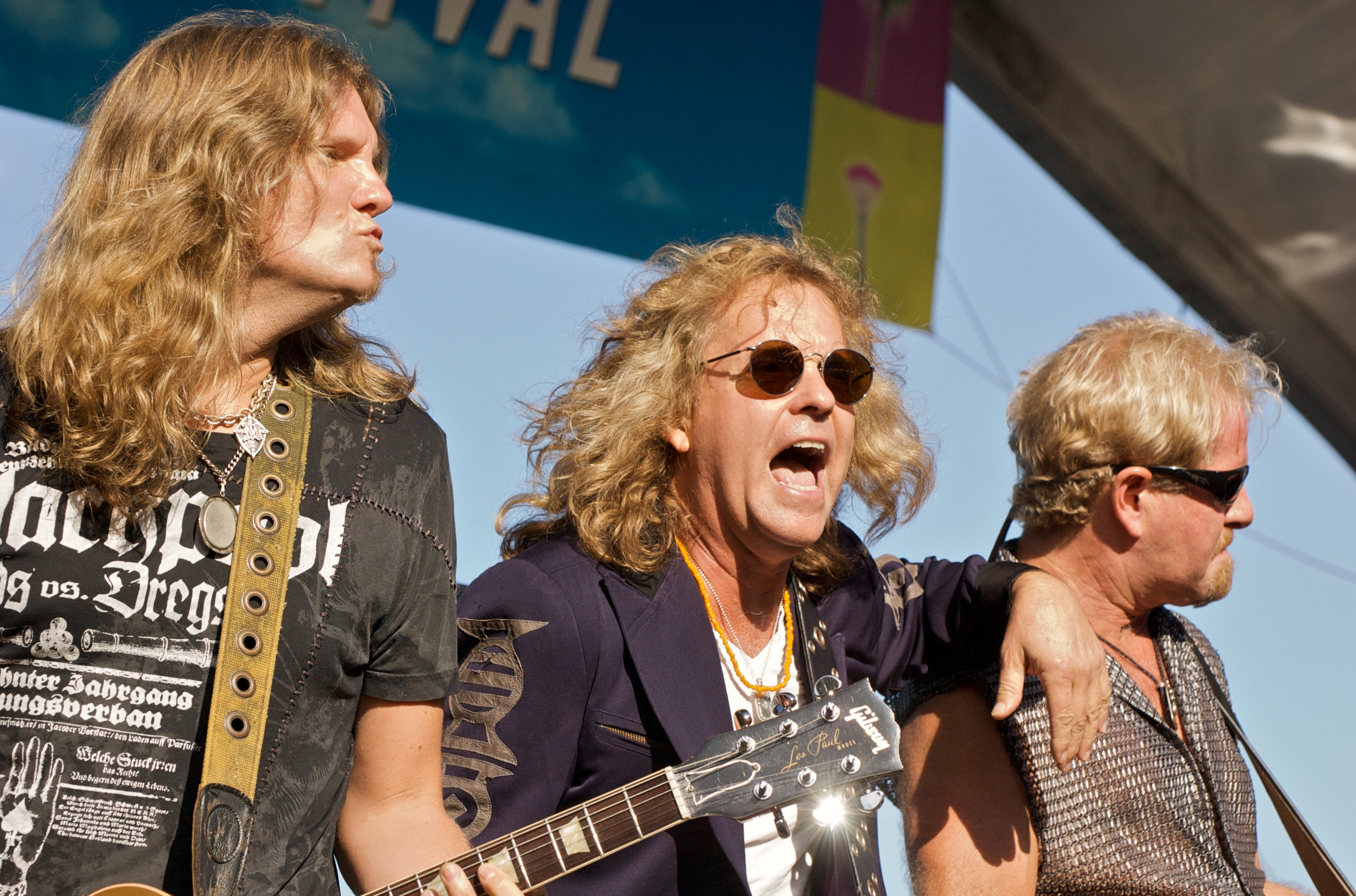
- Night Ranger live at Sausalito Art Festival 2009
- Studio albums: 13
- Live albums: 9
- Compilation albums: 6
- Singles: 16

Night Ranger is an American hard rock band formed in San Francisco, California in 1979 by Jack Blades, Kelly Keagy and Brad Gillis. A year later Alan Fitzgerald and Jeff Watson joined completing their original lineup. Their discography consists of 13 studio albums, nine live albums, six compilation albums and 16 singles.

== Albums ==
=== Studio albums ===
| Title | Album details | Peak chart positions | | | | | | | | | Certifications |
| Title | Album details | CAN | US | US Rock | US Hard Rock | JPN | GER | SWI | UK Ind | UK Rock | Certifications |
|---|---|---|---|---|---|---|---|---|---|---|---|
| Dawn Patrol | Released: November 1982; Label: Boardwalk | 86 | 38 | — | — | — | — | — | — | — | US: Gold |
| Midnight Madness | Released: October 27, 1983; Label: MCA | 24 | 15 | — | — | — | 58 | — | — | — | CAN: Gold; US: Platinum |
| 7 Wishes | Released: May 20, 1985; Label: MCA | 43 | 10 | — | — | 7 | — | — | — | — | US: Platinum |
| Big Life | Released: March 23, 1987; Label: MCA | — | 28 | — | — | — | — | — | — | — | US: Gold |
| Man in Motion | Released: September 26, 1988; Label: MCA | — | 81 | — | — | 10 | — | — | — | — | |
| Feeding Off the Mojo | Released: October 17, 1995; Label: Drive Entertainment | — | — | — | — | 67 | — | — | — | — | |
| Neverland | Released: March 26, 1997; Label: Zero Corporation | — | — | — | — | 19 | — | — | — | — | |
| Seven | Released: March 28, 1998; Label: Zero Corporation | — | — | — | — | 87 | — | — | — | — | |
| Hole in the Sun | Released: April 27, 2007; Label: Frontiers | — | — | — | — | 31 | — | — | — | — | |
| Somewhere in California | Released: June 21, 2011; Label: Frontiers | — | 179 | — | 18 | 33 | — | — | — | — | |
| High Road | Released: June 10, 2014; Label: Frontiers | — | 105 | 31 | 9 | 36 | — | 54 | — | 32 | |
| Don't Let Up | Released: March 24, 2017; Label: Frontiers | — | 55 | — | 12 | — | 85 | 44 | — | 11 | |
| ATBPO | Released: August 6, 2021; Label: Frontiers | — | 40 | — | 18 | 35 | 89 | 13 | 36 | 15 | |
"—" denotes releases that did not chart or were not released in that territory.

=== Live albums ===
- Live in Japan (1990)
- Rock in Japan '97 (1997)
- Rock Breakout Years: 1984 (2005)
- The Best of Night Ranger Live (2006)
- Night Ranger Live (2007)
- Extended Versions (2007)
- Rockin' Shibuya 2007 (2008)
- 24 Strings & a Drummer (Live & Acoustic) (2012)
- 35 Years and a Night in Chicago (2016) #15 on Hard Rock Albums Chart

=== Compilation albums ===
- Greatest Hits (1989) (RIAA: Gold)
- Rock Masterpiece Collection (1998)
- Keep Rockin': Best Selection '97–'98 (1998)
- 20th Century Masters: The Millennium Collection – The Best of Night Ranger (2000)
- Hits, Acoustic & Rarities (2005)
- Icon (2015)
- Best Of (2026)

== Singles ==
| Title | Release | Peak chart positions | | | | | Album |
| Title | Release | US | US Rock | CAN | GER | AUS | Album |
|---|---|---|---|---|---|---|---|
| "Don't Tell Me You Love Me" | 1982 | 40 | 4 | — | — | — | Dawn Patrol |
| "Sing Me Away" | 1983 | 54 | 39 | — | — | — | Dawn Patrol |
| "Young Girl in Love" | 1983 | — | — | — | — | — | Dawn Patrol |
| "(You Can Still) Rock in America" | 1983 | 51 | 15 | — | — | — | Midnight Madness |
| "Sister Christian" | 1984 | 5 | 2 | 1 | 67 | 99 | Midnight Madness |
| "When You Close Your Eyes" | 1984 | 14 | 7 | 41 | — | — | Midnight Madness |
| "Sentimental Street" | 1985 | 8 | 3 | 29 | — | — | 7 Wishes |
| "Four in the Morning (I Can't Take Any More)" | 1985 | 19 | 13 | 84 | — | — | 7 Wishes |
| "Goodbye" | 1985 | 17 | 16 | 85 | — | — | 7 Wishes |
| "The Secret of My Success" | 1987 | 64 | 12 | — | — | — | Big Life |
| "Color of Your Smile" | 1987 | — | — | — | — | — | Big Life |
| "Hearts Away" | 1987 | 90 | — | — | — | — | Big Life |
| "I Did It for Love" | 1988 | 75 | 16 | — | — | — | Man in Motion |
| "Reason to Be" [airplay] | 1989 | — | 48 | — | — | — | Man in Motion |
| "Don't Start Thinking (I'm Alone Tonight)" | 1989 | — | — | — | — | — | Man in Motion |
| "Forever All Over Again"† | 1997 | 102 | — | — | — | — | Neverland |
"—" denotes a recording that did not chart or was not released in that territory.

†"Forever All Over Again" Bubbled Under the Hot 100 at #2.

== Videos ==
| Year | Album details |
|---|---|
| 1983 | Night Ranger: Japan Tour: Release date: 1984; Label: CBS/FOX (LaserDisc, VHS), Sony Music Japan (DVD); Recorded live at Shinjuku Kousei Nenkin Hall, Tokyo, Japan on December 13, 1983 |
| Year | Album details |
| 1985 | 7 Wishes Tour: Release date: 1986; Label: Pioneer (Laserdisc), MCA Home Video (VHS); Recorded live at Irvine Meadows Amphitheatre, Irvine, CA on September 25, 1985 |
| Year | Album details |
| 1988 | Japan In Motion: Release date: 1989; Label: Warner/Pioneer (LaserDisc), MCA/Universal (VHS); Recorded live at Shibuya Public Hall, Tokyo, Japan on November 19, 1988 |
| Year | Album details |
| 2004 | 20th Century Masters: The Best of Night Ranger: Release date: 2004; Label: Universal Music Group (DVD); Contains five music videos from their first three albums |

== Music videos ==
- 1982: "Don't Tell Me You Love Me"
- 1983: "Sing Me Away"
- 1983: "(You Can Still) Rock in America"
- 1984: "Sister Christian"
- 1984: "When You Close Your Eyes"
- 1985: "Sentimental Street"
- 1985: "Goodbye"
- 1985: "Four in the Morning"
- 1987: "The Secret of My Success"
- 1987: "Hearts Away"
- 1987: "Color of Your Smile"
- 1988: "I Did It for Love"
- 1997: "New York Time"
- 1998: "Sign of the Times"
- 2011: "Growing Up in California"
- 2014: "High Road"
- 2014: "Knock Knock Never Stop"
- 2017: "Day and Night"
- 2017: "Running Out of Time"
- 2018: "Truth"
- 2021: "Breakout"
- 2021: "Bring It All Home to Me"
