= Greatest Hits (Night Ranger album) =

Greatest hits album by Night Ranger
- Released: June 12, 1989
- Genre: Hard rock; glam metal
- Length: 52:20
- Label: MCA
- Producer: Pat Glasser; David Foster; Brian Foraker
- Compiler: Andy McKaie

Night Ranger chronology
Man in Motion (1988)	Greatest Hits (1989)	Feeding off the Mojo (1995)

Professional ratings
Review scores
Source	Rating
Allmusic	4/5 stars

Greatest Hits is a compilation album released by Night Ranger in 1989. It included tracks from each of the band's first five studio albums. In 1994, the album was certified Gold by the RIAA for shipments of half a million copies to U.S. retailers.

== Track listing ==
Side one
No.	Title	Writer(s)	Original album	Length
1.	"(You Can Still) Rock in America"	Jack Blades, Brad Gillis	Midnight Madness	4:14
2.	"Sing Me Away"	Blades, Kelly Keagy	Dawn Patrol	4:08
3.	"Goodbye"	Blades, Jeff Watson	7 Wishes	4:18
4.	"When You Close Your Eyes"	Blades, Alan Fitzgerald, Gillis	Midnight Madness	4:17
5.	"Sister Christian"	Keagy	Midnight Madness	5:01

Side two
No.	Title	Writer(s)	Original album	Length
1.	"Don't Tell Me You Love Me"	Blades	Dawn Patrol	4:20
2.	"Sentimental Street"	Blades	7 Wishes	4:10
3.	"The Secret of My Success"	Blades, David Foster, Tom Keane, Michael Landau	Big Life	4:26
4.	"Restless Kind"	Blades, Keagy	Man in Motion	4:39
5.	"Four in the Morning"	Blades	7 Wishes	3:51
Total length:				43:24

CD bonus tracks
No.	Title	Writer(s)	Original album	Length
11.	"Eddie's Comin' Out Tonight"	Blades	Dawn Patrol	4:24
12.	"Rumours in the Air"	Blades	Midnight Madness	4:32
Total length:				52:20

== Personnel ==
Night Ranger

- Jack Blades – bass guitar, vocals
- Alan Fitzgerald – keyboards, vocals (except on Restless Kind)
- Brad Gillis – guitar, vocals
- Kelly Keagy – drums, vocals
- Jeff Watson – guitar

Additional musicians

- Jesse Bradman – keyboards (on Restless Kind)
- Joyce Imbesi – keyboards (on Restless Kind)

Production

- Brian Foraker – producer (track 9)
- David Foster – producer (track 8)
- Greg Fulginiti – mastering
- Pat Glasser – producer (1–7, 10–12)
- Andy McKaie – compiler, coordinator

== Certifications ==
Region	Certification	Certified units/sales
United States (RIAA)	Gold	500,000^{^}
^{^} Shipments figures based on certification alone.
