= Time Passes =

Studio album by Kelly Keagy
- Released: April 17, 2001
- Genre: Hard rock
- Length: 50:37
- Label: Frontiers Records; FR CD 063
- Producer: Kelly Keagy; Jim Peterik; Brad Gillis

Kelly Keagy chronology
Time Passes (2001)	I'm Alive (2006)

Time Passes is the debut solo album by Kelly Keagy.

The track "Wrong Again" was written and demoed by the Gary Moon-led Night Ranger in the early 1990s.

== Track listing ==
1. "Anything Goes" – 4:19 (Jack Blades, Kelly Keagy, Tim Pierce, Jeff Watson, Aaron Zigman)
2. "Acid Rain" – 4:08 (Jack Blades, Jim Peterik)
3. "Time Passes" – 5:03 (Kelly Keagy)
4. "Before Anybody Knows I'm Gone" – 6:05 (Jack Blades, Jim Peterik)
5. "Too Much to Ask" – 4:40 (Kevin Chalfant, Kelly Keagy, Jim Peterik)
6. "Bottled Up" – 4:02 (Bruce Gaitsch, Kelly Keagy)
7. "Too Close to the Sun" – 4:37 (Kelly Keagy, Jim Peterik)
8. "Wrong Again" – 4:50 (Brad Gillis, Kelly Keagy, Gary Moon, Todd Meagher)
9. "Where There's a Woman" – 5:06 (Jim Peterik)
10. "The Journey" – 4:42 (Kelly Keagy, Jim Peterik)
11. "The Moon" – 3:05 (R. Barron, Kelly Keagy)
12. "I'm Still Here" – 5:04 (Japanese edition [MICP-10232] bonus track)

== Personnel ==
- Kelly Keagy – [lead] vocals, drums; guitar (3, 4, 7); bass (3, 7); keyboards (3); background vocals (3, 4, 6, 8, 9, 10)
- Jeff Watson – lead guitar (1)
- Mike Aquino – lead guitar (2); guitar (5, 9, 10)
- Jim Peterik – guitar (2); background vocals (2, 9, 10); bass (5); keyboards (5, 9, 10)
- Brad Gillis – lead guitar (7, 8)
- Gary Moon – [lead] vocals, background vocals, bass (8)
- Bruce Gaitsch – guitar (6)
- Brian Bart – guitar (1,2,3,5,6,12); lead guitar (2,3,4,5,6,12); keyboards (1,2,3,5); bass (3,4,6,11,12)
- Christian Cullen – keyboards (7)
- Jodi Tanaka – Hammond B3 organ (1)
- Scott May – Hammond B3 organ (4)
- Jack Blades – bass (1, 2)
- Bill Syniar – bass (9, 10)
- J.P. Smith – background vocals (1, 7)
- Ron Platt – background vocals (2)
- Joe Vana – background vocals (10)

== Production ==
- Kelly Keagy – producer, engineer, mixing
- Jim Peterik – producer, mixing
- Brad Gillis – producer
- Brian Bart – engineer, mixing
- Larry Millas – engineer
