= Lone Ranger (Jeff Watson album) =

Studio album by Jeff Watson
- Released: 1992
- Recorded: Watson Forsey Recording in Mill Valley, California
- Genre: Instrumental rock
- Length: 38:31
- Label: Shrapnel
- Producer: Jeff Watson, Jerry Marquez

Jeff Watson chronology
| Lone Ranger (1992) | Around the Sun (1993) |

Lone Ranger is the first studio album by former Night Ranger guitarist Jeff Watson, released in 1992 through Shrapnel Records.

== Track listing ==
All tracks are written by Jeff Watson, except where noted.

| No. | Title | Length |
|---|---|---|
| 1. | "Mountain Cathedral" | 1:19 |
| 2. | "Cement Shoes" | 4:24 |
| 3. | "Forest of Feeling" | 6:05 |
| 4. | "Hi-Yo Silver" | 3:57 |
| 5. | "Picnic Island" | 1:02 |
| 6. | "Morris Minor" | 3:23 |
| 7. | "Osaka Rocka" | 2:43 |
| 8. | "Eco Chalet" (Watson, Jesse Bradman) | 4:43 |
| 9. | "Talking Hands" (Watson, Steve Morse) | 4:28 |
| 10. | "Pipe Dream" | 3:24 |
| 11. | "Song for Rebecca" | 3:03 |
| Total length: | | 38:31 |

== Personnel ==
- Jeff Watson – vocals, guitar, slide guitar, strings, bass, saxophone sampling, engineering, production
- Sammy Hagar – scat singing (track 2)
- Brad Gillis – guitar (track 2)
- Allan Holdsworth – guitar solo (track 3)
- Steve Morse – guitar solo (track 9)
- Curt Kroeger – synthesizer
- Steve Smith – drums (tracks 3, 9)
- Carmine Appice – drums (track 4)
- Spike Orberg – drums (tracks 2, 6, 7, 8, 10)
- Brad Russell – bass guitar (tracks 2, 3, 6, 11)
- Randy Coven – bass (tracks 7, 9, 10)
- Bob Daisley – bass (track 4)
- David Sikes – bass guitar (track 8)
- Steve Machtinger – viola (track 8)
- Gabriel Flemming – trumpet

Technical

- Jerry Marquez – engineering, mixing (tracks 2–4, 7, 8, 10), production
- Mark Hutchins – engineering assistance
- Steve Fontano – mixing (tracks 1, 5, 6, 9, 11)
- Paul Stubblebine – mastering
