= I'm Alive (Kelly Keagy album) =

Studio album by Kelly Keagy
- Released: January 16, 2007
- Genre: Rock
- Length: 61:16
- Label: Frontiers Records
- Producers: Kelly Keagy, Jim Peterik

Kelly Keagy chronology
| Time Passes (2001) | I'm Alive (2007) |

I'm Alive is a solo album released by Night Ranger's drummer Kelly Keagy. Released in 2007 on Frontiers Records, it features Jim Peterik, Reb Beach, and Michael Lardie.

== Track listing ==
1. "I'm Alive" - 4:36
2. "Stolen" - 4:36
3. "Blink of an Eye" - 5:25
4. "When Nobody's Looking" - 4:01
5. "Back of Your Mind" - 6:29 *1
6. "Life Worth Remembering" - 4:20 *1
7. "Re-Imagine" - 4:48 *2
8. "World Before and After" - 4:38
9. "Where Are We Now" - 2:10
10. "Where the Road Ends" - 4:03 *1
11. "Everything I Need in a Woman" - 4:42
12. "Call in Another Day" - 5:43
13. "Half a World Away" - 5:45
14. "Life Worth Remembering" (acoustic, Japanese release [KICP-1226] bonus track) - 4:20

All songs written by Kelly Keagy and Jim Peterik, except:

- 1 Kelly Keagy, Jim Peterik, Bruce Gaitisch
- 2 Kelly Keagy, Jim Peterik, Michael Lardie

== Personnel ==
- Kelly Keagy - lead and backing vocals, drums, percussion, guitar, producer, mixing
- Jim Peterik - guitar, bass, keyboards, backing vocals, producer, mixing
- Reb Beach, Mike Aquino, Brian Bart, Bruce Gaitsch, Tommy Denander - guitars
- Michael Lardie - keyboards, engineer
- Mike Behymer - keyboards
- George Hawkins - bass
- Kent Slucher - drums
