= Goodbye (Night Ranger song) =

Single by Night Ranger

from the album 7 Wishes
- B-side: "Seven Wishes"
- Released: October 1985
- Genre: Hard rock
- Length: 4:20
- Label: MCA
- Songwriter: Jeff Watson / Jack Blades
- Producer: Pat Glasser

Night Ranger singles chronology
"Four in the Morning (I Can't Take Anymore)" (1985)	"Goodbye" (1985)	"The Secret of My Success" (1987)

Audio
- "Goodbye" on YouTube

"Goodbye" is a power ballad by the American hard rock band Night Ranger. It was released in October 1985, as the third and last single from their album 7 Wishes. It was written by guitarist Jeff Watson and singer Jack Blades. The lead vocals on this song are sung by drummer Kelly Keagy.

Reaching No. 17, the song is the last U.S. top 40 hit for the band to date. The music video for "Goodbye" had frequent rotation on MTV at end of that year.

== Track listing ==
=== Single version ===
- 7" Single
1. "Goodbye" - 4:20
2. "Seven Wishes" - 4:52

=== Promo version ===
- 12" Single
1. "Goodbye" - 4:20
2. "Goodbye" (short version) - 3:52

== Charts ==
Chart (1985)	Peak position
Canada Top Singles (RPM)	88
US Billboard Hot 100	17
US Mainstream Rock (Billboard)	16
