= Precious Time =

Precious Time can refer to:

- Precious Time (album), an album by Pat Benatar
- "Precious Time" (Van Morrison song), a single by Van Morrison
- "Precious Time" (The Maccabees song), a single by The Maccabees
- "Precious Time", a song by Night Ranger from their album Feeding off the Mojo
