= Gilrock Ranch =

Studio album by Brad Gillis
- Released: 1993
- Recorded: Gilrock Ranch Studios in Lafayette, California
- Genre: Instrumental rock, hard rock
- Length: 45:11
- Label: Guitar Recordings
- Producer: Brad Gillis, Paul Carlson, Toby Wright, John Stix

Brad Gillis chronology
Gilrock Ranch (1993)	Alligator (2000)

Professional ratings
Review scores
Source	Rating
AllMusic	(No review)

Gilrock Ranch is the first studio album by Night Ranger guitarist Brad Gillis, released in 1993 through Guitar Recordings. The album marks the first recorded work of keyboardist Derek Sherinian.

== Track listing ==
No.	Title	Writer(s)	Length
1.	"Stampede"	Brad Gillis, Derek Sherinian	3:01
2.	"Honest to God"	Gillis, Gregg Allman	5:06
3.	"Opus Winfrus"	Gillis, Sherinian	5:10
4.	"Monster Breath"	Gillis, Rodney Freidrich	4:44
5.	"Slow Blow"	Gillis, Sherinian	5:01
6.	"Mr. Lollipop"	Gillis	4:58
7.	"If Looks Could Kill"	Gillis, Allman, Freidrich	4:17
8.	"Lions, Tigers & Bears"	Gillis, Sherinian, Carmine Appice	4:43
9.	"Shades of Pomposity"	Gillis, Sherinian	3:42
10.	"Gilrock Ranch"	Gillis, Sherinian	4:29
Total length:			45:11

== Personnel ==
- Brad Gillis – guitar, bass (tracks 1–3, 6, 7, 9, 10), engineering, mixing, production
- Gregg Allman – vocals (tracks 2, 7)
- David Bradley – monster vocals (track 4)
- Montanna Gillis – baby cry (track 10)
- Mark Jellyroll Burkstahler – slide guitar (tracks 2, 10)
- Derek Sherinian – keyboard (tracks 1–3, 5, 6, 8–10)
- Rodney Freidrich – keyboard (tracks 4, 7)
- Carmine Appice – drums (tracks 1, 5, 8)
- Kelly Keagy – drums (tracks 2, 4)
- Michael Cartellone – drums (tracks 3, 9, 10)
- Ronnie Sief – drums (track 6)
- T.J. – drums (track 7)
- Gary Moon – bass (track 4)
- Robin Sylvester – bass (track 5)
- Larry Antonino – bass (track 8)
- Jennifer Newell – background vocals (track 2)
- Paul Carlson – engineering, mixing, production
- Toby Wright – engineering, mixing, production
- Mark Newman – engineering
- Dale Kelly – engineering
- John Stix – executive production
