= Joel Hoekstra =

American guitarist (born 1970)

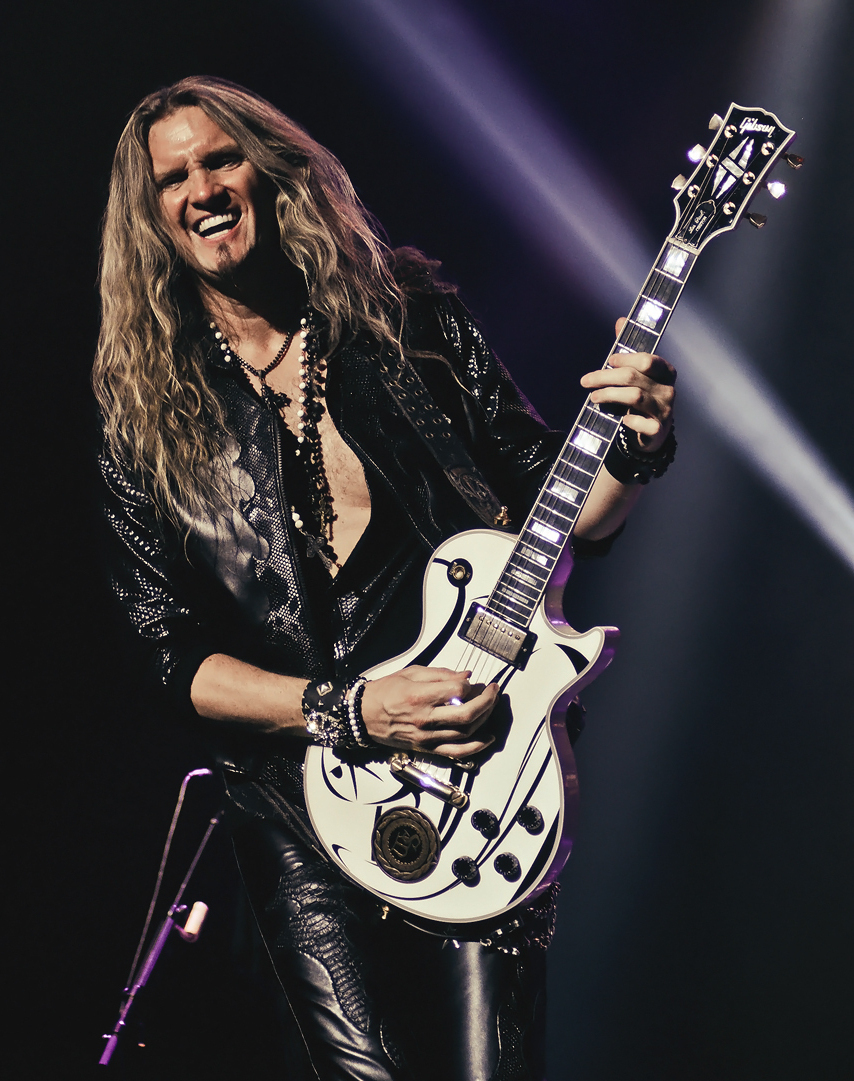
- Hoekstra performing with Whitesnake in 2019

Background information
- Born: December 13, 1970 (age 54); Iowa City, Iowa, U.S.
- Genres: Rock, hard rock, heavy metal, blues rock
- Occupation: Musician
- Instrument: Guitar
- Website: joelhoekstra.com

Joel Hoekstra (born December 13, 1970) is an American musician best known for his position as one of the final guitarists of the hard rock band Whitesnake. He also tours as a guitarist for Trans-Siberian Orchestra. The son of classical musicians, he started out playing cello and piano at a young age, but it was hearing Angus Young of AC/DC that inspired him to start playing the guitar. He was raised in the suburbs of Chicago, in Orland Park, but has lived in New York City since 2001.

Hoekstra has performed with Trans-Siberian Orchestra, Cher, and Night Ranger, among many others, and was the lead guitarist in the Broadway musical, Rock of Ages. He also made a cameo appearance alongside Sebastian Bach, Nuno Bettencourt, Kevin Cronin and Debbie Gibson in the big screen movie adaptation of Rock of Ages.

== Career ==
=== Night Ranger ===
In 2008, Hoekstra joined Night Ranger and combined with guitarist Brad Gillis as a part of the group's dual guitar driven sound. Hoekstra toured with Night Ranger and performed on several albums with the group and appeared in the videos for the songs Growin' Up In California, Knock Knock Never Stop and High Road. In 2011, Joel filled in for Mick Jones in Foreigner while continuing to play with Night Ranger on the same tour.

=== Whitesnake ===
In 2014, Hoekstra joined Whitesnake as their guitarist alongside fellow guitarist Reb Beach. Hoekstra played on The Purple Album (released May 2015) which was a re-imagination of classic songs from David Coverdale's time as the lead singer for Deep Purple. Hoekstra appeared in the videos for the songs "Stormbringer", "Gypsy" and "Soldier of Fortune" off The Purple Album and "Shut Up & Kiss Me" and "Trouble is Your Middle Name" videos off the Flesh and Blood album. Hoekstra was co-writer with Coverdale on six of the songs on Flesh and Blood. He has toured with Whitesnake on their The Purple Album tour (2015–16), The Greatest Hits tour (2016–2018) and their Flesh and Blood tour (2019).

Hoekstra maintained his position in Whitesnake through the European leg of the band's 2022 Farewell Tour, which was cut short due to health issues suffered by David Coverdale, with the last show of the tour being held at France's Hellfest on June 23, 2022. The North American dates for were also later cancelled. In November of 2025, David Coverdale announced his retirement via social media, leaving Hoekstra and Reb Beach as the final reigning guitarists of Whitesnake.

=== Cher ===
Hoekstra played guitar for Cher on the Here We Go Again Tour of 2018–2020. He also served as guitarist for Cher during her Las Vegas residency at the Monte Carlo. Hoekstra performed at the 2017 Billboard Music Awards as the guitarist for Cher on the songs "Believe" and "If I Could Turn Back Time" as Cher received the Icon Award.

Hoekstra additionally accompanied Cher as lead guitarist for her Rock and Roll Hall of Fame induction ceremony on October 19, 2024.

Hoekstra made another television appearance with Cher on the Saturday Night Live 50th Anniversary Special on February 16, 2025.

=== Joel Hoekstra's 13 ===
In 2015, Frontiers Records released the debut album Dying to Live from Hoekstra's side project Joel Hoekstra's 13, to rave reviews. The album featured performances by Russell Allen, Vinny Appice, Tony Franklin, Derek Sherinian, and Jeff Scott Soto.

Hoekstra released JH13's long-awaited sophomoric album Running Games in 2021 with the same lineup of musicians.

Crash of Life (2023), the third release by Joel Hoekstra's 13, marked a departure from the vocals of Russell Allen with the appearance of vocalist Girish Pradhan of Girish and the Chronicles on lead vocals.

Hoekstra, in collaboration with Frontiers Records, announced via social media an upcoming fourth album, From the Fade, to be released in early 2026. This album again features performances by Girish Pradhan, Vinny Appice, Tony Franklin, Derek Sherinian, and Jeff Scott Soto.

=== Revolution Saints ===
Hoekstra joined the Frontiers Records supergroup Revolution Saints in 2022 for their 2023 release, Eagle Flight, alongside Deen Castronovo and Jeff Pilson. Hoekstra stepped in to fill the position once held by Doug Aldrich.

Hoekstra indicated via Instagram in August 2025 that he is recording for a new Revolution Saints album.

=== Iconic ===
Another Frontiers Records assembly, Iconic features Hoekstra on guitar alongside band members Michael Sweet, Nathan James, Alessandro DelVecchio, and fellow Whitesnake alumni, Tommy Aldridge and Marco Mendoza.

Hoekstra indicated via Instagram in August 2025 that he is recording for a new Iconic album.

=== Other side projects and guest appearances ===
In 2016, Hoekstra played on Michael Sweet's album One Sided War and appeared in the video for the song "Radio".

Hoekstra served as a counselor at the 20th anniversary of the Rock 'n Roll Fantasy Camp where he played along with Nancy Wilson, Vinnie Appice, Steven Adler, and Gregg Bissonette and others. Hoekstra also frequently plays acoustic duo shows with singer/guitarist Brandon Gibbs (Devil City Angels). Hoekstra also performed with Paul Shortino on the song "War Cry" on the album Sinister (released on October 27, 2017) by Appice (Carmine Appice and Vinny Appice).

Hoekstra appeared as guest guitarist on two episodes of That Metal Show on VH1 Classic (January 25, 2014, and March 14, 2015). and has performed on stage and in the studio with many artists including Foreigner, Dee Snider, Jeff Scott Soto, Jim Peterik, The Turtles, Big Brother & the Holding Company, and many more.

Hoekstra has contributed to many articles in Guitar World magazine and in 2017 Guitar World released an instructional DVD titled Hard Rock Lead Guitar Master Class with Joel Hoekstra.

In January 2024, it was announced that Hoekstra would be joining Accept for the European and South American legs of their tour. The year 2024 also brought Hoekstra television opportunities including playing on Dancing with the Stars for their "Hair Metal" episode, Season 33, Episode 4.

== Discography ==
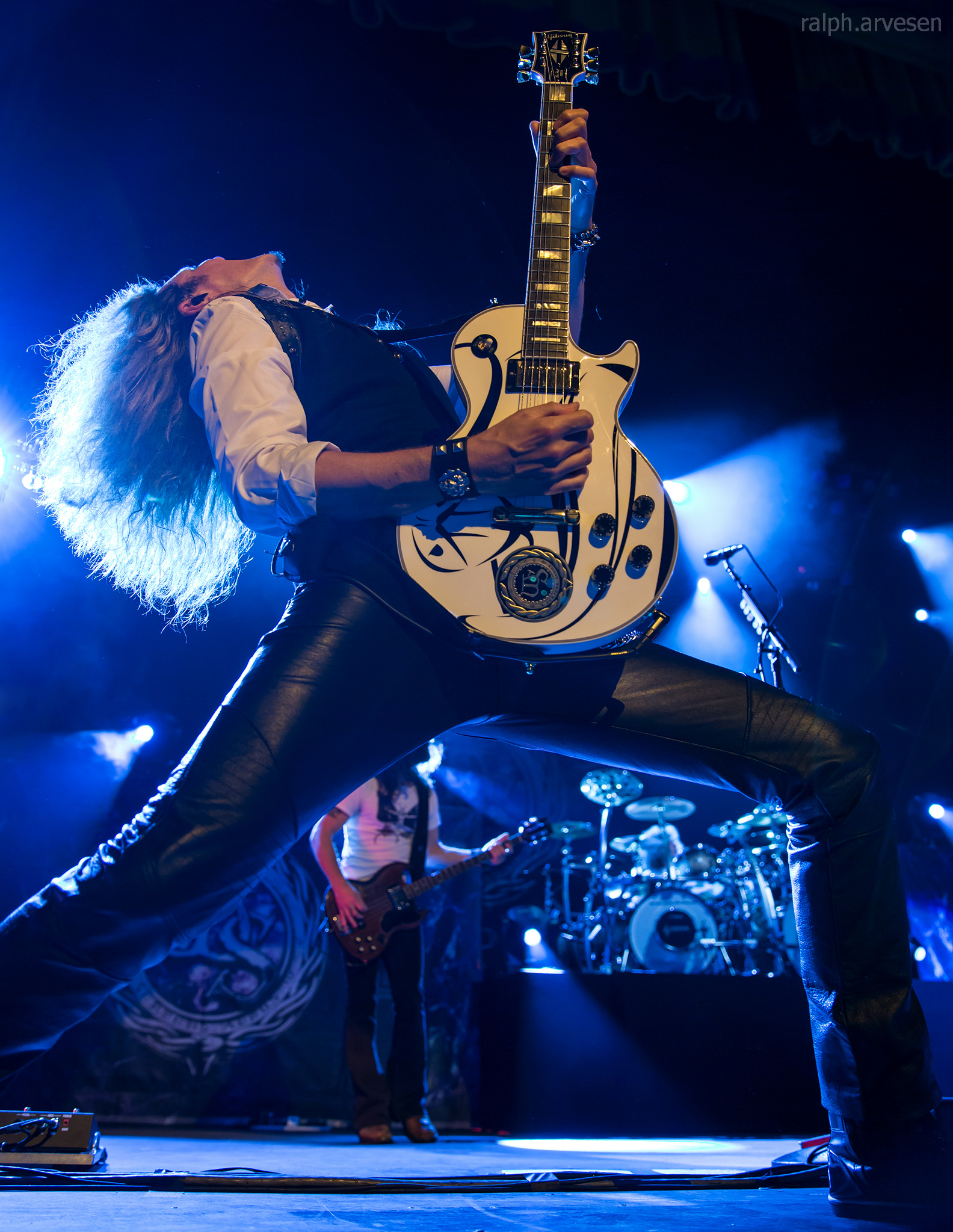
Hoekstra with Whitesnake in 2015

=== Solo albums ===
- Undefined (2000)
- The Moon Is Falling (2003)
- 13 Acoustic Songs (2007)

=== Joel Hoekstra's 13 ===
- Dying to Live (2015)
- Running Games (2021)
- Crash of Life (2023)
- From the Fade (2026)

=== Contributing albums ===
- Rock of Ages – Original Broadway Cast Recording (2009)
- Night Ranger – Somewhere in California (2011)
- Night Ranger – 24 Strings & a Drummer (Live & Acoustic) (2012)
- Night Ranger – High Road (2014)
- Jack Blades – Rock 'n Roll Ride (2012)
- Jeff Scott Soto – Damage Control (2012)
- Trans-Siberian Orchestra – Dream of Fireflies (On a Christmas Night) (2012)
- Amy Lee – Aftermath (2014)
- VHF – Very High Frequency (2014)
- Whitesnake – The Purple Album (2015)
- Michael Sweet – One Sided War (2016)
- Tony Mills – Streets of Chance (2017)
- Whitesnake – The Purple Tour (2017)
- Whitesnake – Flesh and Blood (2019)
- Chris Catena's Rock City Tribe – Truth in Unity (2020)
- Whitesnake – Restless Heart (1997; 2021 recording remixes only)
- Iconic – Second Skin (2022)
- Docker's Guild – The Mystic Technocracy – Season 2: The Age of Entropy (2022)
- Revolution Saints – Eagle Flight (2023)
- Michael Schenker – My Years with UFO (2024) (Hoekstra is guest guitarist in the song „Natural Thing“)
- Gordian feat Graham Bonnet - Eyes Grow Wide - closing guitar solo (2025)
