= Around the Sun (Jeff Watson album) =

Studio album by Jeff Watson
- Released: 1993
- Studio: The Camp Recording Studio
- Genre: Progressive rock, rock
- Label: Cleopatra, Dead Line Music
- Producer: Jeff Watson, Mark Needham

Jeff Watson chronology
Lone Ranger (1992)	Around the Sun (1993)

Professional ratings
Review scores
Source	Rating
AllMusic	3/5 stars

Around the Sun is a solo album by American guitarist Jeff Watson. Jeff Watson features two guest vocalists on this album; Steve Walsh from the band Kansas and Aaron Hagar. It was first released in 1993, then it was reissued in 1999.

== Track listing ==
All songs written by Jeff Watson except where noted

1. "Glass Revenge" - 4:02
2. "Life Goes On" (Steve Walsh, Jeff Watson) - 3:39
3. "Around the Sun" - 4:52
4. "Follow" - 5:59
5. "Anna Waits" - 5:00
6. "Tight Rope" - 3:25 (Jeff Watson, Spike Orberg)
7. "Leslie Ann" - 4:35
8. "Man's Best Friend" - 5:36
9. "Moment of Truth" - 4:19
10. "Shadows of Winter" - 5:52
11. "Serenity" - 4:53
12. "Ghost Town" - 6:45
13. "When My Ship Comes In" - 4:32

== Personnel ==
- Jeff Watson - guitars, backing vocals; bass (2–4, 6–9); drums (10–12); lead vocals (4,7,10,11,12)
- Aaron Hagar - vocals (1, 9)
- Steve Walsh - vocals (2, 3, 5, 6, 13)
- Bob Daisley - bass (1, 5)
- Spike Orberg - drums; backing vocals (2, 3, 6, 7); percussion (9)
- Bob McBain - keyboards (4)
- Curt Kroeger - percussion (4)
- Jesse Bradman - keyboards, backing vocals (5)
- Brad Russell - upright bowed bass (9)
