= Rubicon (American band) =

American funk rock band

Background information
- Origin: San Francisco, California
- Genres: Funk rock, blue-eyed soul, soft rock
- Years active: 1977–1979, 1990s
- Label: 20th Century Fox
- Past members: Jerry Martini; Greg Eckler; Brad Gillis; Max Haskett; Dennis Marcellino; Jim Pugh; Jack Blades; Johnny Colla; Chuck Crenshaw; J. P. Michaels; David Christians; Randy Newhouse

Rubicon was a California funk rock band, whose "I'm Gonna Take Care of Everything" spent 11 weeks on the Billboard Hot 100 in 1978, peaking at number 28.

== History ==
Rubicon was formed in San Francisco by Jerry Martini, who was an original member of Sly and the Family Stone. Other members of the group included Greg Eckler (vocals, drums), Brad Gillis (guitar), Max Haskett (lead vocals, horns), Dennis Marcellino (sax, vocals), Jim Pugh (keyboards), Jack Blades (bass), and Johnny Colla (saxophone/guitar). Their first album, the self-titled Rubicon, released in 1978, generated their only chart single. "I'm Gonna Take Care of Everything" also peaked on Canada's RPM 100 Singles at No. 31. They released a second album in 1979, titled America Dreams, before disbanding. Drummer Kelly Keagy was brought on as a touring drummer before the breakup. Keagy, Gillis, and Blades went on to form the successful band Night Ranger. Johnny Colla would become a founding member of Huey Lewis and the News.

Rubicon reformed in the early 1990s as a progressive rock band with Eckler (drums), Chuck Crenshaw (keyboards), J. P. Michaels (vocals, bass guitar), David Christians (vocals, lead guitar), and Randy Newhouse (guitar). This iteration of Rubicon produced one CD called Best of Rubicon, and a single "Whipping Boy", written by Michaels and Crenshaw.

Trumpeter/vocalist Haskett died on September 15, 1999, of pancreatic cancer, followed by Eckler on November 15, 2020, of heart failure.

== Discography ==
=== Studio albums ===
- Rubicon (1978)
- America Dreams (1979)

== See also ==
- California Jam II
