= ATBPO =

Studio album by Night Ranger
- Released: August 6, 2021
- Genre: Rock
- Length: 49:16
- Label: Frontiers
- Producer: Night Ranger

Night Ranger chronology
Don't Let Up (2017)	ATBPO (2021)

ATBPO is the thirteenth studio album by American hard rock band Night Ranger, released in August 2021 by Frontiers Music. "ATBPO" is an acronym for the old saying, "And the Band Played On".

== Track listing ==
ATBPO track listing
No.	Title	Length
1.	"Coming for You"	4:38
2.	"Bring It All Home to Me"	4:32
3.	"Breakout"	4:14
4.	"Hard to Make It Easy"	3:47
5.	"Can't Afford a Hero"	4:54
6.	"Cold as December"	4:54
7.	"Dance"	4:07
8.	"The Hardest Road"	5:27
9.	"Monkey"	4:01
10.	"A Lucky Man"	3:49
11.	"Tomorrow"	4:53
Total length:		49:16

== Personnel ==
Night Ranger

- Jack Blades – bass, lead vocals
- Kelly Keagy – drums, lead vocals
- Brad Gillis – guitars, vocals
- Eric Levy – keyboards, vocals
- Keri Kelli – guitars, vocals

== Charts ==
Chart (2021)	Peak position
German Albums (Offizielle Top 100)	89
Japanese Albums (Oricon)	35
Swiss Albums (Schweizer Hitparade)	13
UK Independent Albums (OCC)	36
UK Rock & Metal Albums (OCC)	15
US Billboard 200	40
US Top Hard Rock Albums (Billboard)	18
