= Keri Kelli =

American Guitarist

- Kelli in 2025

Background information
- Born: Kenneth Fear Jr. September 7, 1971 (age 55); Huntington Beach, California, US
- Genres: Heavy metal, hard rock, glam metal, glam rock
- Occupations: Musician, songwriter
- Instrument: Guitar
- Years active: 1987–present
- Website: Official website

Keri Kelli (born Kenneth Fear Jr.) is an American guitarist who has played with artists and groups including Alice Cooper, Slash, Jani Lane, Vince Neil and John Waite. In March 2013 he formed Project Rock together with James Kottak from the Scorpions. Project Rock consisted of Keri Kelli, James Kottak, Tim 'Ripper' Owens, Rudy Sarzo & Teddy Zig-Zag. Kelli is currently in the band Night Ranger.

== Biography ==
Kelli was born in Huntington Beach, California on September 7, 1971. He has founded several bands, including Saints of the Underground, Adler's Appetite (formerly Suki Jones), New World Idols, Rubber (formerly Blow), Big Bang Babies, and Empire (1987). He has played with other bands including Slash's Snakepit, Skid Row, Vince Neil Band, Ratt, Warrant, L.A. Guns, Pretty Boy Floyd, Dad's Porno Mag, The Newlydeads, Bulletboys, Love/Hate, Tuff, Tal Bachman, Angel City Outlaws (formerly Phucket), Alice Cooper, Liberty N' Justice and Night Ranger.

In July 2009, Keri opened Aces & Ales, an American craft beer bar and restaurant in Las Vegas, Nevada. In June 2013, he opened a second restaurant.

== Reception ==
A 1996 Los Angeles Times review of Rubber said, "Singer Keri Kelli has an actor’s knack, with unpredictable phrasing that brings immediacy to the songs as he moves from stick-out-your-tongue impertinence to full-on urgency."

== Discography ==
Empire

- Show Ya – (1987) – single / vinyl – cassette tape single

Big Bang Babies

- Big Bang Babies – (1992)
- Black Market – (1994)
- 3 Chords & the Truth – (1999)
- Hollywood Hairspray Vol.1 – (2002) – "Let's Go"
- The Glam That Stole Christmas Vol.1 – (2002) – "Winter Wonderland"

Rubber

- Rubber – (1996) – Cassette Tape (4 tracks)
- Safe Sex, Designer Drugs, and the Death of Rock N Roll – (1996) – Cassette Tape (5 tracks)

The Newlydeads

- Re-Bound – (1998) – 2 tracks from forthcoming album "Black & Shiny"
- Black & Shiny – (unreleased)
- Dead End – (2001) – some songs from "Black & Shiny"
- Dream from a Dirt Nap – (2006) – best of. some songs from "Black & Shiny"

Pretty Boy Floyd

- The Pink and the Black – (1998) – incl. "Saturday Night"(early version)
- A Tale of Sex, Designer Drugs, and the Death of Rock N Roll – (1998)
- Porn Stars – (1999)
- The World's Greatest Heavy Metal Anthems – (2000) – "Lether Boyz With Electric Toyz"
- Porn Stars (Japanese Edition) – (2000) – incl. 2 bonus tracks
- No Brakes -BIG M.F. Compilation- – (2000) – "Shout It Out Loud"
- The Ultimate – (2004)
- Dirty Glam – (2004) – re-issue of "Porn Stars" with some bonus demo tracks
- Vault II – (2003)
- Take It Down – (2007) (unreleased) – feat. Aerial Stiles. written by Keri Kelli / Steve Summers.

Dad's Porno Mag

- Dad's Porno Mag – (2000)

U.S. Crush

- U.S. Crush – (2000) – co-wrote "Bleed" & "Collision Course", Guitar on "Bleed"

Goliath

- The Gate – (2000) – guitar solo on "Demons"

Shameless

- Backstreet Anthems – (1999) – wrote lyrics for "Talk to Me", but wrong credit printed in original booklet.
- Backstreet Anthems (Japanese Edition) – (1999) – wrote lyrics for "Talk to Me" (credit is fixed)
- Talk to Me – (unreleased) – wrote lyrics and on vocals
- Queen 4 a Day – (2000)
- Splashed – (2002)
- Super Hardcore Show – (2003)
- Undressed: An Unmasked Tribute to Kiss- – (2003)
- Famous 4 Madness – (2007)
- Forever Ends Today – (2013) single incl. "Queen 4 A Day(remastered)"
- Splashed – (2013) – Cardboard Sleeve edition
- Life's a Gas – (2013) – single incl. "Live 4 Today"
- Queen 4 a Day (Remaster 2013) – (2013)
- Beautiful Disaster – (2013)

Website

Sonofabitch

- Greatest Hits – (2002)
- The Black Compilation – (2006)

New World Idols

- 5 Tracks Promotion CD – (unreleased)
- Agent Cody Banks (soundtrack) – (2003) – "Up Town Girl"(cover of Billy Joel) Keri (Vo., B. & G.), Chad Stewart (Ds.)

Warrant

- Under the Influence – (2001) – co-wrote "Sub Human" & "Face"

Jani Lane

- Back Down to One – (2002) – released by Jani himself (8 tracks)
- Back Down to One – (2003) – released from Z RECORDS (11 tracks)
- Monster Ballads X Mas – (2007) – plays guitar on "Have Yourself a Merry Little Christmas"

L.A. Guns

- Rips the Covers Off – (2004) – On the two live songs
- Hellraiser's Ball: Caught in the Act (CD Version) (2008)
- Electric Gypsy - Live (CD+DVD) (2019) The same as Hellraiser's Ball CD/DVD

Adler's Appetite

- Adler's Appetite – (2005)
- Adler's Appetite – (2005) – different booklet called "Black Rose Version"

Liberty N' Justice

- Soundtrack of a Soul – (2006) – co-wrote and play "Another Nail" (Sebastian Bach on vocals)
- Independence Day – (2007) – guitar on "Doubting Thomas"
- Light It Up – (2009) – guitar on "Every Reason To Believe"
- Hell Is Coming to Breakfast – (2012) – co-wrote "Sin (Original Acoustic Demo)", Guitar on "Stretch Armstrong"
- Cigar Chronicles – (2013) – co-wrote and guitar on "Sin"

Nicollette Knight

- Nicollette Knight – (2006) – play all instruments and recorded some unreleased songs of Big Bang Babies

Angel City Outlaws

- Hell Bent Forever: A Tribute to Judas Priest – (2008) – "Heading Out to the Highway"

Saints of the Underground

- Love the Sin, Hate the Sinner – (2008)

Alice Cooper

- Along Came a Spider – (2008)
- Theater of Death – Live at Hammersmith 2009 – Live album & video (2010)
- Keepin' Halloween Alive – 7" single (2010) C.side – "I Love the Dead(Live)" from "Theater of Death"(Live CD)
- Welcome 2 My Nightmare – (2011) "We Gotta Get Outta This Place" (The Animals cover) as bonus track

Stephen Pearcy

- Social Intercourse – (2002) – co-wrote "Freak", "In the Corner" and "Five Fingers"
- Fueler – (2004) – co-wrote and play "That Sick Thing" & "Spy Vs. Spy"
- Metal Mania Stripped Vol.2 – The Anthems – (2008) – plays acoustic guitar on "Round and Round"

Penny Lane

- Midnight Tales from the Funhouse : Part 1 – (2009) – produced, co-wrote and play on almost all songs

V.A.

- Shout at the Remix: A Tribute to Mötley Crüe- – (2000) – guitar on "Looks That Kill (Spahn Ranch remix)"
- Welcome to the Aerosmithonian: A Tribute to Aerosmith- – (2001) – guitar on "Sweet Emotion"
- Name Your Poison: A Tribute to Poison- – (2001) – guitar on "Talk Dirty to Me", "Look What the Cat Dragged In", "I Won't Forget You" and "Fallen Angel"
- It's So Easy: A Millennium Tribute to Guns N' Roses- – (2006) – guitar on "Night Train"
- Too Fast for Love: A Millennium Tribute to Mötley Crüe- – (2007) – guitar on "Dr. Feelgood"
- Misty Mountain Hop: A Millennium Tribute to Led Zeppelin – (2008) – guitar on "Ocean"
- Lick It Up: A Millennium Tribute to Kiss – (2008) – guitar on "Shout It Out Loud"
- Hell Bent Forever: A Tribute to Judas Priest – (2008) – "Desert Plains" Keri(G. & B.), Brent Fitz(Ds.), Vince Neil(Vo.)
- Wicked Garden: A Millennium Tribute to Stone Temple Pilots – (2009) – guitar on "Tripping on a Hole in a Paper Heart"
- Lit Up: A Millennium Tribute to Buckcherry – (2009) – guitar on "Crazy Bitch"
- Rock & Roll Train: A Millennium Tribute to AC/DC – (2011) – guitar on "Highway to Hell"
- No More Tears: A Millennium Tribute to Ozzy Osbourne – (2012) – guitar on "Crazy Train"
- Down at the Whiskey : A Tribute To Mötley Crüe's Greatest Hits 1981–2013 – (2013) – guitar on "Dr. Feelgood"
- Blackdog : A Tribute To LED ZEPPELIN's Greatest Hits – (2014) – guitar on "The Ocean"

New Skool Kings

- Here to Say – (2009) – produced

Metavenge

- Demo CD – (2009) – engineered

Aqua Cats

- Alkaline State – (2010) All music & Produced by Denny Lake & Keri Kelli. Engineered and Read guitar as "Keri Cool Cat".

Pushking

- The World As We Love It – (2011) – "Troubled Love" feat. with Alice Cooper. Also Keri is listed as co-producer for this song.

Vengeance

- Crystal Eye (Limited Edition Incl. 2 Bonus Tracks) – (2012) – co-wrote "Paint This Town"

Tuff

- What Comes Around Goes Around...Again! – (2012) – "I Hate Kissing You Goodbye"

Becca Williams (The Reapers)

- Grim Reaper Test – (2012) Keri Kelli as producer and additional instrumentation for Williams. Becca Williams, guitars. Timexx Nasty on vocals. Sean Elg on drums. Recorded August at For the Gods, OC, CA

John Waite

- Live All Access – (2013)
- Best – (2014)

Ray C.

- Undone – (2013) Produce, Mix and Lead guitar

Forever Young

- Never Say Goodnight – (2014) Mixed by Keri Kelli

Night Ranger

- Don't Let Up (2017)
- ATBPO (2021)

Jim Peterik & World Stage

- Winds of Change (2019) Lead guitar on "I Will What I Want"

== Videography ==
Big Bang Babies

- Home "Made" Video – (1992) Video

L.A. Guns

- Hellraiser's Ball: Caught in the Act – (2004) DVD

Alice Cooper

- Sweden Rock Festival 2006 – (2006) DVD "School's Out"
- Theater Of Death DVD (2010)

Pretty Boy Floyd

- London, England 2002 – DVD

Shameless

- Glamology Part 1 1989 – 2000 – DVD (2013)

Night Ranger

- 35 Years & A Night In Chicago - 2CD/DVD (2016)
