= Don't Let Up =

Studio album by Night Ranger
- Released: March 24, 2017
- Genre: Hard rock
- Length: 50:35
- Label: Frontiers

Night Ranger chronology
High Road (2014)	Don't Let Up (2017)	ATBPO (2021)

Don't Let Up is the twelfth studio album by American hard rock band Night Ranger, released on March 24, 2017. It peaked at No. 12 on the Billboard Top Hard Rock Albums chart on June 15, 2017. It is the first Night Ranger studio album to feature Keri Kelli on guitar, who replaced Joel Hoekstra after he left to join Whitesnake.

== Track listing ==
1. "Somehow Someway" (Jack Blades, Brad Gillis, Kelly Keagy, Keri Kelli) – 4:40
2. "Running Out of Time" (Blades, Gillis, Keagy) – 4:25
3. "Truth" (Blades, Gillis, Keagy, Kelli) – 4:26
4. "Day and Night" (Blades, Gillis, Keagy) – 5:21
5. "Don't Let Up" (Blades, Gillis, Keagy, Kelli) – 4:19
6. "(Won't Be Your) Fool Again" (Blades, Gillis, Keagy) – 5:20
7. "Say What You Want" (Blades, Gillis, Keagy) – 4:16
8. "We Can Work It Out" (Blades, Gillis, Keagy) – 4:02
9. "Comfort Me" (Blades, Gillis, Keagy, Kelli) – 5:10
10. "Jamie" (Blades, Gillis, Keagy) – 3:58
11. "Nothing Left of Yesterday" (Blades, Gillis, Keagy) – 4:38

== Personnel ==
- Jack Blades – bass, lead vocals
- Kelly Keagy – drums, lead vocals
- Brad Gillis – guitars, vocals
- Eric Levy – keyboards, vocals
- Keri Kelli – guitars, vocals

== Charts ==
Chart (2017)	Peak position
German Albums (Offizielle Top 100)	85
Swiss Albums (Schweizer Hitparade)	44
UK Rock & Metal Albums (OCC)	11
US Billboard 200	55
US Top Hard Rock Albums (Billboard)	12
