= Somewhere in California (album) =

Studio album by Night Ranger
- Released: June 21, 2011
- Genre: Hard rock
- Length: 54:22
- Label: Frontiers

Night Ranger chronology
Hole in the Sun (2007)	Somewhere in California (2011)	High Road (2014)

Professional ratings
Review scores
Source	Rating
Allmusic	3.5/5 stars
Classic Rock	Superior

Somewhere in California is the tenth studio album by American hard rock band Night Ranger, released on June 21, 2011. It is the first album since the departure of original guitarist Jeff Watson in 2007. The album introduces new guitarist Joel Hoekstra and keyboardist Eric Levy. Although the previous three releases are regarded as different and more experimental for Night Ranger, this album has been noted as somewhat of a return to the signature Night Ranger sound from the successful 1980s releases. The first single and video from the album is "Growin' Up in California".

== Track listing ==
1. "Growin' Up in California" (Jack Blades, Will Evankovich) – 4:25
2. "Lay It on Me" (Jack Blades, Brad Gillis, Kelly Keagy) – 4:36
3. "Bye Bye Baby (Not Tonight)" (Jack Blades, Brad Gillis, Kelly Keagy) – 4:34
4. "Follow Your Heart" (Jack Blades, Brad Gillis, Joel Hoekstra, Kelly Keagy) – 6:45
5. "Time of Our Lives" (Colin Blades, Jack Blades, Brad Gillis, Kelly Keagy) – 5:15
6. "No Time to Lose" (Jack Blades, Brad Gillis, Kelly Keagy) – 4:29
7. "Live for Today" (Jack Blades, Brad Gillis, Kelly Keagy) – 6:03
8. "It's Not Over" (Jack Blades, Brad Gillis, Kelly Keagy) – 4:34
9. "End of the Day" (Jack Blades, Jeff Carlisi, Brad Gillis, Kelly Keagy) – 4:07
10. "Rock n' Roll Tonite" (Jack Blades, Brad Gillis, Kelly Keagy) – 4:11
11. "Say It with Love" (Jack Blades, Brad Gillis, Joel Hoekstra, Kelly Keagy) – 5:17

A re-recorded extended version of the 1990 song "Coming of Age" by former supergroup Damn Yankees, featuring Jack Blades and Ted Nugent, is offered exclusively by Amazon.com's MP3 downloading service Amazon MP3. iTunes on the other hand, offers an exclusive download of a cover of AC/DC's hit song "Dirty Deeds Done Dirt Cheap" along with the album.

== Personnel ==
- Jack Blades – bass, lead vocals
- Kelly Keagy – drums, lead vocals
- Joel Hoekstra – guitars, vocals
- Brad Gillis – guitars, vocals
- Eric Levy – keyboards, vocals

== Charts ==
Chart (2011)	Peak position
Japanese Albums (Oricon)	33
US Billboard 200	179
US Top Hard Rock Albums (Billboard)	18
