= Man in Motion (Night Ranger album) =

Studio album by Night Ranger
- Released: September 26, 1988
- Studio: Fantasy Studios, Berkeley, California, Goodnight LA Studio, Los Angeles, California
- Genre: Hard rock; AOR; glam metal
- Length: 50:05
- Label: MCA
- Producer: Keith Olsen, Brian Foraker

Night Ranger chronology
Big Life (1987)	Man in Motion (1988)	Feeding Off the Mojo (1995)

Singles from Man in Motion
- 1. "I Did It for Love" Released: September 1988; 2. "Don't Start Thinking (I'm Alone Tonight)" Released: November 1988

Man in Motion is the fifth studio album by Night Ranger, released in 1988. This album was the first studio album recorded by Night Ranger after the departure of keyboardist Alan Fitzgerald, who was replaced by Jesse Bradman.

== Background ==
"Man in Motion" saw a change in the musical direction of the band, focusing on a more guitar driven sound. Unfortunately the change in direction did not result in much radio play and the album became the first Night Ranger album to fail to achieve gold or platinum status

Bassist and singer Jack Blades would leave the band in 1989 to form rock super group Damn Yankees with Tommy Shaw of Styx and Ted Nugent. Jeff Watson also left to join the band Mother's Army. Jack Blades discussed why he left Night Ranger, stating that the members of the band were going in different directions, with everyone writing separate songs and their egos clashing.

The band would not release another album until 1995's album Feeding Off the Mojo, which featured Gary Moon of Three Dog Night on bass and vocals. Jack Blades, Jeff Watson, and Alan Fitzgerald all returned to the band for 1997's album Neverland.

== Reception ==
Professional ratings
Review scores
Source	Rating
AllMusic	2/5 stars
Classic Rock	Superior
Collector's Guide to Heavy Metal	7/10

"Man in Motion" received mixed reviews and its singles were unable to gain much recognition. The first single off the album was "I Did It for Love", which topped out on the Billboard Top 100 at 75. The second single "Reason to Be" reached position 48 in 1989 on the Billboard Mainstream Rock Airplay chart. The third single, "Don't Start Thinking (I'm Alone Tonight)", failed to chart at all.

== Track listing ==
All credits adapted from the original release.

Side one
No.	Title	Writer(s)	Length
1.	"Man in Motion"	Brad Gillis, Jack Blades	4:26
2.	"Reason to Be"	Blades, Kelly Keagy	4:10
3.	"Don't Start Thinking (I'm Alone Tonight)"	Alan Fitzgerald, Blades, Keagy	4:42
4.	"Love Shot Me Down"	Blades	4:06
5.	"Restless Kind"	Blades, Keagy	4:40

Side two
No.	Title	Writer(s)	Length
6.	"Halfway to the Sun"	Blades	5:18
7.	"Here She Comes Again"	Bob Halligan Jr., Blades, Martin Briley, Michael Bolton	4:18
8.	"Right on You"	Blades, Keagy	4:12
9.	"Kiss Me Where It Hurts"	Gillis, Blades	4:33
10.	"I Did It for Love"	Russ Ballard	4:46
11.	"Woman in Love"	Blades	4:42

== Personnel ==
Night Ranger

- Jack Blades – bass, lead vocals
- Brad Gillis – guitars, vocals
- Jeff Watson – guitars
- Kelly Keagy – drums, lead vocals

Additional musicians

- Jesse Bradman – keyboards, vocals
- Alan Pasqua, Claude Gaudette, Eric Persing – additional keyboards
- Joyce Imbesi – keyboards on track 5
- John Purdell – additional keyboards, additional vocals
- Kevin Chalfant – additional vocals
- Mark Newman – computer programming

Production

- Keith Olsen – producer, engineer and mixing on tracks 1 to 4, 6 to 9, 11
- Brian Foraker – producer, engineer and mixing on tracks 5 and 10
- Jimmy Reitizel – additional arrangements on track 5
- John Hanlon, Mark Segal – engineers
- Ron Da Silva, Squeak Stone – assistant engineers on tracks 5 and 10
- Greg Fulginiti – mastering at Artisan Sound Recorders, Hollywood, California
- David Cole – executive producer on track 5 and 10
- Hugh Syme – art direction, design

== Charts ==
Chart (1988)	Peak position
Japanese Albums (Oricon)	10
US Billboard 200	81
