= Mother's Army =

American music group (1993–1998)

- Origin: Los Angeles, U.S.
- Genres: Hard rock
- Years active: 1993-1998
- Labels: Polydor
- Past members: Joe Lynn Turner; Jeff Watson; Bob Daisley; Aynsley Dunbar; Carmine Appice

Mother's Army was an American hard rock supergroup founded in 1993.

Their original line-up consisted of vocalist Joe Lynn Turner, guitarist Jeff Watson, bassist Bob Daisley and drummer Carmine Appice. For the last studio album, Aynsley Dunbar took over the drums.

Throughout the five years of its existence, Mother's Army has released three studio albums. The band split up in 1998.

== Discography ==
=== Studio albums ===
- Mother's Army (1993)
- Planet Earth (1997)
- Fire on the Moon (1998)
