= High Road (Night Ranger album) =

Studio album by Night Ranger
- Released: June 10, 2014
- Genre: Hard rock
- Length: 51:22
- Label: Frontiers

Night Ranger chronology
Somewhere in California (2011)	High Road (2014)	Don't Let Up (2017)

Professional ratings
Review scores
Source	Rating
Classic Rock	Good

High Road is the eleventh studio album by American hard rock band Night Ranger, released on June 10, 2014. It peaked at No. 105 on the Billboard 200 albums chart, No. 31 on the Billboard Top Rock Albums chart, and No. 9 on the Billboard Hard Rock Albums chart, all on June 28, 2014. The Best Buy edition of the album includes two additional songs "Mountain Song" and "Don't Even Know Your Name".

== Track listing ==
1. "High Road" (Colin Blades, Jack Blades, Brad Gillis, Kelly Keagy) - 3:54
2. "Knock Knock Never Stop" (Jack Blades, Brad Gillis, Kelly Keagy) - 3:41
3. "Rollin' On" (Jack Blades, Brad Gillis, Kelly Keagy) - 4:44
4. "Don't Live Here Anymore" (Jack Blades, Brad Gillis, Kelly Keagy, Eric Levy) - 5:39
5. "I'm Coming Home" (Jack Blades, Brad Gillis, Joel Hoekstra, Kelly Keagy) - 4:50
6. "X Generation" (Jack Blades, Brad Gillis, Kelly Keagy) - 4:56
7. "Only for You Only" (Jack Blades, Brad Gillis, Kelly Keagy, Eric Levy) - 4:38
8. "Hang On" (Jack Blades, Brad Gillis, Kelly Keagy) - 5:38
9. "St. Bartholomew" (Jack Blades, Brad Gillis, Kelly Keagy) - 4:26
10. "Brothers" (Jack Blades, Brad Gillis, Kelly Keagy, Eric Levy) - 4:30
11. "L.A. No Name" (instrumental) (Brad Gillis, Joel Hoekstra) - 4:26

== Personnel ==
- Jack Blades - bass, lead vocals
- Kelly Keagy - drums, lead vocals
- Brad Gillis - guitars, vocals
- Joel Hoekstra - guitars, vocals
- Eric Levy - keyboards, vocals

== Charts ==
Chart (2014)	Peak position
Japanese Albums (Oricon)	36
Swiss Albums (Schweizer Hitparade)	54
UK Rock & Metal Albums (OCC)	32
US Billboard 200	105
US Top Hard Rock Albums (Billboard)	9
US Top Rock Albums (Billboard)	31
