= Big Life (album) =

Studio album by Night Ranger
- Released: March 23, 1987
- Studio: Fantasy Studios, Berkeley, California, Chartmaker Studio, Malibu, California
- Genre: Hard rock; AOR; glam metal
- Length: 42:15
- Label: MCA
- Producer: Kevin Elson & Night Ranger, David Foster ("The Secret of My Success")

Night Ranger chronology
7 Wishes (1985)	Big Life (1987)	Man in Motion (1988)

Singles from Big Life
- 1. "The Secret of My Success" Released: March 1987 (US); 2. "Color of Your Smile" Released: April 1987 (UK); 3. "Hearts Away" Released: July 1987

Professional ratings
Review scores
Source	Rating
AllMusic	2/5 stars
Classic Rock	Superior
Collector's Guide to Heavy Metal	7/10

Big Life is the fourth studio album by Night Ranger, released in March 1987. It featured the single "The Secret of My Success", which was written for the 1987 film of the same name starring Michael J. Fox. The single flopped, stalling outside the Top 40, peaking at No. 64. It was a top twenty hit on the Mainstream Rock Chart though, hitting number 12, and was one of the most played videos in the spring of 1987 on MTV. "Hearts Away" was the second single/video and peaked at No. 90 on the Hot 100 chart. The third single/video, "Color of Your Smile" failed to chart in the U.S. at all.

This album would be the last to feature soon-to-depart original keyboardist Alan Fitzgerald until his return to the band a decade later for the Neverland album.

== Track listing ==
Side one
No.	Title	Writer(s)	Length
1.	"Big Life"	Jack Blades, Brad Gillis	5:16
2.	"Color of Your Smile"	Blades	4:13
3.	"Love Is Standing Near"	Alan Fitzgerald, Blades, Kelly Keagy	4:24
4.	"Rain Comes Crashing Down"	Blades	5:56

Side two
No.	Title	Writer(s)	Length
5.	"The Secret of My Success" (from the motion picture soundtrack of The Secret of My Success)	Blades, David Foster, Tom Keane, Michael Landau	4:26
6.	"Carry On"	Blades, Keagy	4:19
7.	"Better Let It Go"	Keagy, Blades	4:40
8.	"I Know Tonight"	Blades	4:03
9.	"Hearts Away"	Blades	4:58

== Personnel ==
Night Ranger

- Jack Blades – bass, lead vocals
- Brad Gillis – guitars, vocals
- Jeff Watson – guitars
- Alan Fitzgerald – keyboards, vocals
- Kelly Keagy – drums, lead vocals

Additional musicians

- David Foster – additional keyboards on "The Secret of My Success"
- Kevin Chalfant – additional vocals
- Bill Champlin – additional vocals on "The Secret of My Success"

Production

- Kevin Elson – producer, engineer, mixing
- David Foster – producer/arranger on "Secret of My Success"
- Wally Buck – engineer
- Rick Hulbrook, Tom Size – additional engineering on "The Secret of My Success"
- David Thoener – mixing
- Frank Pekoc – mixing assistant

== Charts ==
Chart (1987)	Peak position
US Billboard 200	28

== Certifications ==
Region	Certification	Certified units/sales
United States (RIAA)	Gold	500,000^{^}
^{^} Shipments figures based on certification alone.
