= Kelly Keagy =

American drummer

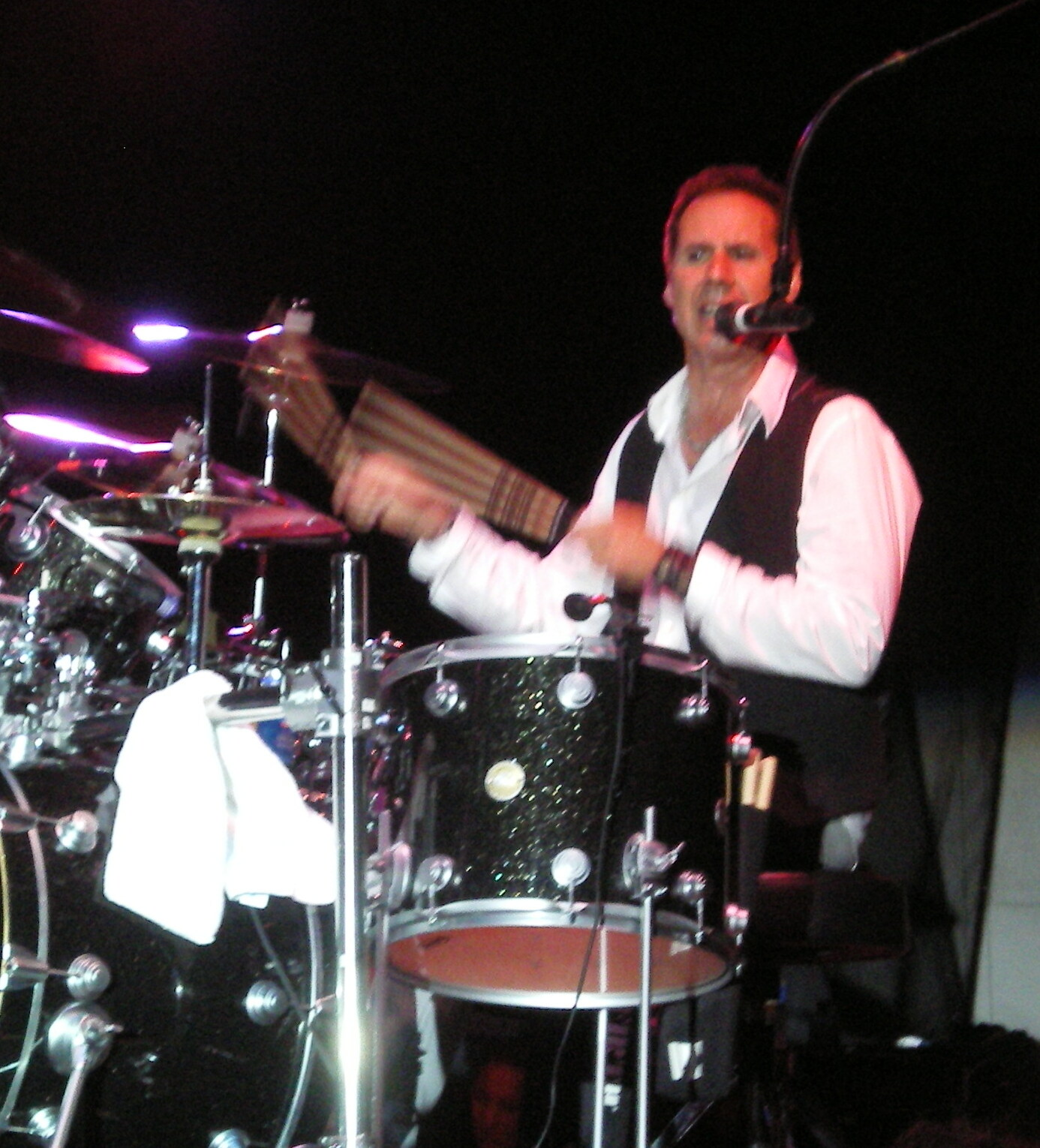
- Keagy in 2009

Background information
- Born: September 15, 1952 (age 72); Glendale, California, U.S.
- Occupation: Musician
- Instrument(s): Drums, vocals
- Years active: 1977–present
- Member of: Night Ranger
- Formerly of: The Mob

Kelly Dean Keagy (born September 15, 1952) is an American drummer and vocalist, best known for his work with the hard rock band Night Ranger. Keagy sang lead vocals on several of their hits, such as "Sister Christian", "Sing Me Away", and "Sentimental Street".

== Biography ==
=== Early years ===
Keagy started out his career as a drummer but over the years gained experience in many aspects of the music business. The day after Kelly graduated high school, he packed his bags and left home to pursue being a full-time drummer. After years of playing the club circuit, he became the touring drummer for the San Francisco band Rubicon. Along with fellow members Jack Blades and Brad Gillis, he formed the band Night Ranger in 1979.

=== Night Ranger ===
After the band gained some experience with local gigs in San Francisco, promoter Bill Graham booked Night Ranger as the opening act for such bands as Judas Priest, Santana, and the Doobie Brothers. They became one of the more popular mainstream hard rock bands of the mid-1980s. Night Ranger's first album, Dawn Patrol, released in 1982, reached No. 38 on the U.S. charts and sold over 1 million copies, yet it was 1983's Midnight Madness that established the band as a commercial force. Featuring the hits "(You Can Still) Rock in America" and "Sister Christian", the record peaked at No. 15 and sold over 2 million copies. The 1985 album 7 Wishes was even more successful, reaching No. 10 on the charts and selling over 3 million copies. In 1988, keyboardist Alan Fitzgerald left Night Ranger, shortly before the recording of Man in Motion. Then, in 1989, after the Man in Motion tour, front man Jack Blades left Night Ranger, with the group disbanding.

In 1991, Night Ranger reformed with Gary Moon replacing Jack Blades on bass and lead vocals. Then in 1996, the classic Night Ranger lineup of Jack Blades/Kelly Keagy/Brad Gillis/Jeff Watson/Alan Fitzgerald reunited. Fitzgerald departed in 2003, and Watson in 2007.

As of 2017, Night Ranger continues to tour and record new music with the current lineup of Jack Blades, Kelly Keagy, Brad Gillis, Kerri Kelli and Eric Levy. Their most recent studio release, Don't Let Up, came out in 2017.

=== The Mob ===
In 2005, Keagy joined guitarist Reb Beach, vocalist Doug Pinnick and keyboardist Timothy Drury to form the group the Mob. They released a self-titled album of the same name.

=== 2000s ===
In 2000, he performed on Jim Peterik's album Jim Peterik and the World Stage. In 2001, Keagy released the first of his two solo albums, performing drums and vocals on Time Passes. In 2007, he released his second solo work, I'm Alive. Keagy is a core member of the band Scrap Metal, along with Mark Slaughter and Gunnar Nelson.

== Equipment ==
Keagy currently plays DW drums and pedals, Evans drumheads, Vic Firth signature drumsticks, and Sabian cymbals, mostly using their HH series.

== Discography ==
=== Solo albums ===
- Time Passes (2001)
- I'm Alive (2007)

=== with Night Ranger ===
- Dawn Patrol (1982)
- Midnight Madness (1983)
- 7 Wishes (1985)
- Big Life (1987)
- Man in Motion (1988)
- Feeding off the Mojo (1995)
- Neverland (1997)
- Seven (1998)
- Hole in the Sun (2007)
- Somewhere in California (2011)
- High Road (2014)
- Don't Let Up (2017)
- ATBPO (2021)

=== with King of Hearts ===
- King of Hearts (1989)

=== with The Mob ===
- The Mob (2005)

=== Guest appearances ===
- Brad Gillis – Gilrock Ranch (1993)
- Jim Peterik and The World Stage – Jim Peterik and The World Stage (2000)
