= Night Ranger =

American hard rock band

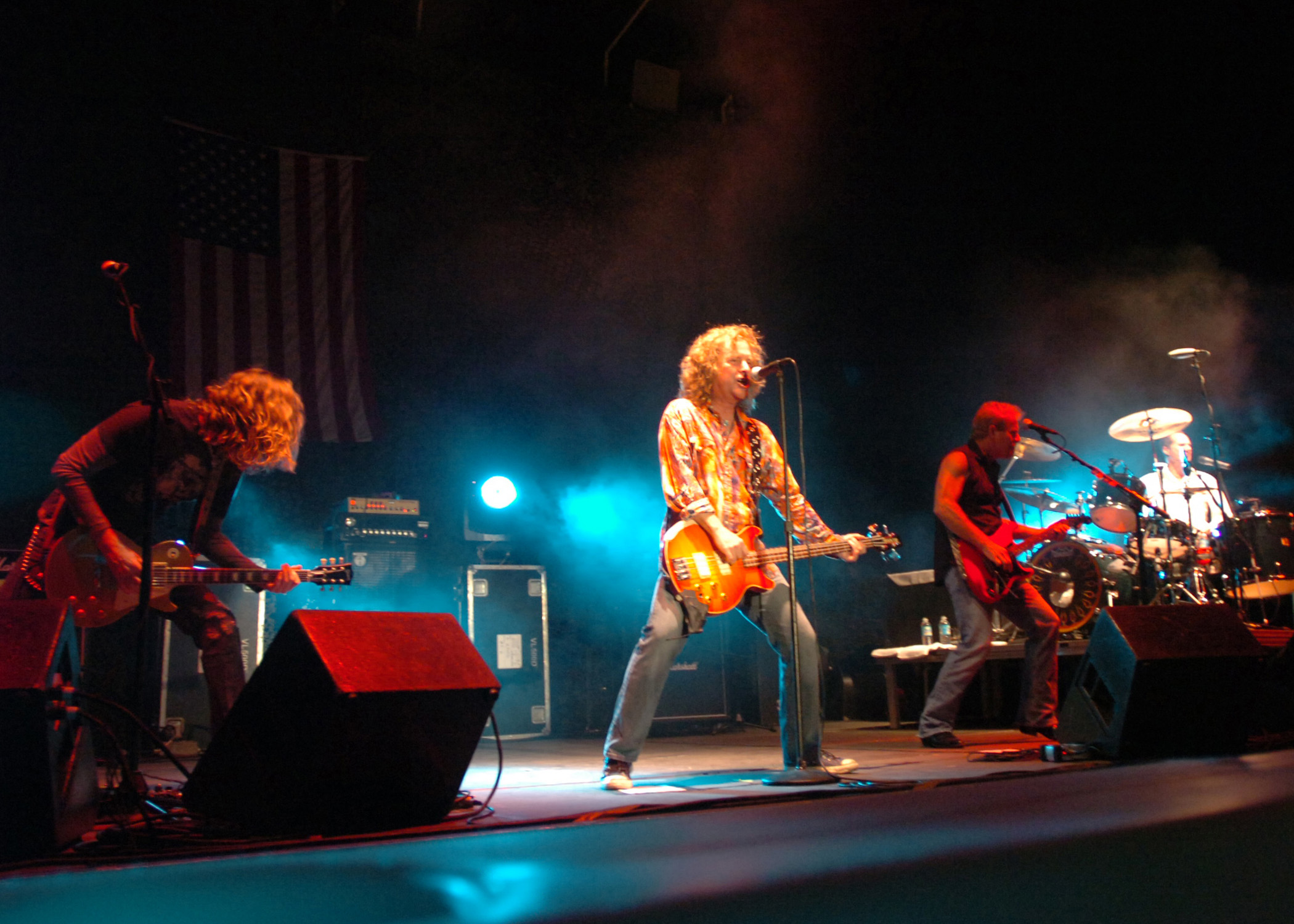
- Night Ranger in 2008

Background information
- Also known as: Stereo (1979–1980); Ranger (1980–1982); Night Ranger (1982–present)
- Origin: San Francisco, California, U.S.
- Genres: Hard rock; arena rock; glam metal
- Years active: 1982–1989; 1991–present
- Labels: MCA; Boardwalk; CMC International; Universal; Legacy; Frontiers
- Members: Jack Blades; Brad Gillis; Kelly Keagy; Eric Levy; Keri Kelli
- Past members: Alan Fitzgerald; Jeff Watson; Jesse Bradman; Gary Moon; David Zajicek; Michael Lardie; Reb Beach; Christian Matthew Cullen; Joel Hoekstra
- Website: nightranger.com

Night Ranger is an American hard rock band from San Francisco, California. The band was incorporated in 1982 after three years of lineup and name changes, and experienced a surge of popularity during the 1980s with the release of several successful albums and hit singles. Guitarist Brad Gillis and drummer Kelly Keagy have been the band's only constant members, though bassist Jack Blades performed on all but one of their albums. Other current members of the band include guitarist Keri Kelli and keyboardist Eric Levy.

The band's first five albums sold more than 10 million copies worldwide and the group has sold 17 million albums total. The quintet is best known for the power ballad "Sister Christian", which peaked at number five on the Billboard Hot 100 in June 1984, along with several other top 40 hit singles in the 1980s, including "Don't Tell Me You Love Me", "When You Close Your Eyes", "Sentimental Street", "Four in the Morning (I Can't Take Any More)", and "Goodbye".

After their success waned in the late 1980s, the band split up in 1989, and its members pursued other musical endeavors, including group and solo efforts. Brad Gillis and Kelly Keagy teamed up with bassist Gary Moon and released an album in 1995 under the Night Ranger moniker without the other original members, but the band reunited with Blades, Watson and Fitzgerald in 1996 to release two new albums in the latter half of the decade. Though there have been lineup changes since that time, the band continues to record and tour.

== History ==
=== Beginnings ===
The group's origin can be traced to Rubicon, a pop/funk group led by former Sly and the Family Stone saxophonist Jerry Martini. After Rubicon's demise in 1979, bassist Jack Blades formed a trio with two other Rubicon members, drummer Kelly Keagy and guitarist Brad Gillis. Performing under the name Stereo, the threesome added former Montrose keyboardist Alan Fitzgerald in 1980. Fitzgerald recommended enlisting a second virtuoso guitarist and Jeff Watson was added to the group. As Stereo, the band played small clubs around San Francisco such as the Palms in the Tenderloin neighborhood. By late that year, the band changed their name to "Ranger" and began opening for acts such as Sammy Hagar.

=== 1980s ===
By 1982, Ranger had done opening stints for ZZ Top and Ozzy Osbourne; the latter had employed Brad Gillis as a replacement guitarist for the recently deceased Randy Rhoads in the spring and summer of 1982. However, in November 1982 the band suddenly changed its name to Night Ranger (after one of their songs) due to a conflicting name trademark held by a country band, the Rangers. By this point, they had already recorded their debut album Dawn Patrol for Boardwalk Records, and had to reprint record jackets bearing the revised name "Night Ranger" only one week before release.

Dawn Patrol's first single, "Don't Tell Me You Love Me", received a boost through its MTV video airplay, and peaked modestly at number 40 on the Billboard Hot 100 chart. "Sing Me Away", with vocals by Keagy, fell short of the top 40 at a peak position of number 54, though it was featured on MTV.

Notable was Night Ranger's pioneering blend of melodic tendencies and ballads, juxtaposed with the hard rock tone that formed the base of their music. Gillis and Watson, becoming acclaimed heavy metal guitarists, featured prominently in magazines such as Guitar for the Practicing Musician, meanwhile overall the band held the same widespread appeal as arena rock acts such as Journey. Though some reviewers of the era derided the band for their decidedly more commercial sound among their contemporaries, Night Ranger's image and sound have since been credited with influencing forthcoming waves of glam metal and hard rock through the 1980s.

After Night Ranger's label, Boardwalk, had folded, producer Bruce Bird secured Night Ranger a deal with MCA on their Camel subsidiary in 1983. Night Ranger's popularity rose sharply with their second album, 1983's Midnight Madness, which pushed the band from opening act to headliner status by the summer of 1984. Apart from the album's first single "(You Can Still) Rock in America", Midnight Madness spun off two hit ballads: "When You Close Your Eyes" (number 14) and "Sister Christian" (number five), written and sung by Kelly Keagy for his younger sister Christine. "Sister Christian" proved to be the band's milestone—as well as a millstone since the song pigeonholed the group as a "Power Ballad" band after its release. According to a later interview with Gillis, "Sister Christian" was actually completed in 1982, but he said the band chose not to release it on Dawn Patrol because they were afraid of losing their hard rock credibility.

In 1985 Night Ranger continued headlining tours in support of their third album 7 Wishes, which followed a very loose concept of the band flying across the ocean in a WWII B-25 Mitchell bomber. Blades later reported that he and Gillis were fascinated by World War II planes. The video for "Sentimental Street" even placed them in an Amelia Earhart scenario, with the entire band lost at sea. Like Midnight Madness, 7 Wishes garnered three hit singles: "Sentimental Street" (number eight; sung by Kelly Keagy); Blades' mid-tempo rocker "Four in the Morning (I Can't Take Anymore)" (number 19), the title describing the time of night Blades wrote the song; and the pleasant, acoustic-flavored "Goodbye" (number 17), which had the band veering in an overtly folk-rock, even country, direction. According to a 2001 TNN interview, Blades wrote "Goodbye" in memory of his older brother, James, who had died from a heroin overdose several years before.

Between 1984 and 1987, Night Ranger branched out into soundtracks, recording or contributing songs to several teen-oriented films. In 1984, the band released "Interstate Love Affair" (later appearing on 7 Wishes) for Teachers, starring Nick Nolte. In 1985, they also contributed another 7 Wishes track, "This Boy Needs to Rock", to the soundtrack of Explorers. The band also received exposure on two Anthony Michael Hall vehicles, Sixteen Candles (1984) and Out of Bounds (1986). "Rumours in the Air" from Midnight Madness appeared on the former, while the latter featured "Wild and Innocent Youth", a rollicking Blades-Keagy composition that has still never been released on a Night Ranger album or compilation.

In 1987 Blades co-wrote the title theme to the Michael J. Fox film The Secret of My Success, which served as the lead-off single on the band's next album, Big Life that same year. Unlike the previous three Night Ranger albums that were produced by Pat Glasser, this one was produced by David Foster and featured more up-tempo songs than power ballads. Big Life featured some fairly mature Blades-Keagy songwriting, including the nuanced fan favorite "Rain Comes Crashing Down", inspired by a stormy California afternoon. "Carry On" was most reminiscent of classic Night Ranger, and was used as the B-side of "The Secret of My Success" single. None of the chosen Big Life singles hit the top 40. "Secret of My Success" stalled just short of hit-single status at number 64 on Billboard's Hot 100 despite heavy rotation on MTV in the spring of 1987. Night Ranger also openly quarreled with MCA over choosing "Hearts Away" as a single instead of one of their heavier songs. Their label expected another top-10 ballad, like "Sister Christian" or "Sentimental Street", but despite Keagy's passionate vocals, "Hearts Away" failed to catch on, peaking at number 90 on Billboard's Hot 100. The band embarked on a vigorous series of tour dates across North America and the Caribbean, featuring The Outfield as the opening act. A third single/video was released for "Color of Your Smile", but it failed to reach the charts due to limited airplay.

In early 1988, Fitzgerald left the band before recording began on their fifth album Man in Motion, citing his diminished role in the more guitar-driven direction the band was striving for on the new album. A majority of the keyboards on the album were performed by Jesse Bradman, who was also hired to perform during live shows on the album's tour. The band attempted a return to their earlier hard rock style to lift the group's sagging fortunes. However, none of the singles from the album gained significant radio airplay, as MCA once again chose to release ballads over harder-edged songs. "I Did It for Love" (written by Russ Ballard) fared poorly, even with a cameo appearance by popular actress Morgan Fairchild in the video. The band still views "Restless Kind" as one of their favorites, but it failed to chart. "Don't Start Thinking (I'm Alone Tonight)" and "Reason to Be" were similarly unsuccessful in early 1989. Man in Motion thus became the first Night Ranger album not to achieve gold or platinum status.

=== Early 1990s: "Moon Ranger" era ===
After a tour in 1988–89 supporting Man in Motion (including an opening slot for Kansas), the members of Night Ranger were feeling the negative effects of constant touring and recording for the past ten years and decided to split up.

Blades left to form the popular super-group Damn Yankees with Ted Nugent and Tommy Shaw of Styx. Gillis and Watson both released their first solo albums, while Watson also joined super-group Mother's Army.

In 1991 Keagy and Gillis began working with ex-Three Dog Night vocalist/bassist Gary Moon and guitarist/keyboardist David Zajicek was added in 1993. They recorded the album Feeding off the Mojo in 1995 with producer David Prater under the Night Ranger name. The album fared poorly both critically and amongst longtime fans. Said Brad Gillis in a 2017 interview:

"Getting together with Gary was an interim thing to keep the Night Ranger brand out there. We had that one record, Feeding off the Mojo. It really wasn't Night Ranger because Night Ranger is...like any other band, you've gotta have that classic voice that sings the songs."

=== 1996–1999: "Reunion" ===
In 1996, Blades returned to Night Ranger, which ultimately led to a reunion of all five original members. Two studio albums were released on CMC Records, 1997's Neverland and 1998's Seven, the title of which seems to disregard the Feeding Off The Mojo album in the band's discography. The new albums were not as successful as their early material in the United States, but the ballad "Forever All Over Again" from Neverland did become a minor Adult Contemporary hit in the States. The albums did become quite popular in Japan.

The band continued to tour between the members' various solo albums and projects, mostly on the summer festival circuit. Blades also began a stint as chief counselor for the Rock 'n Roll Fantasy Camp. In 1999, they joined other 1980s bands in the second installment of the Rock Never Stops Tour, which also happened to feature Blades' former Damn Yankees bandmate Ted Nugent.

=== 2000–2010: Changing lineups ===
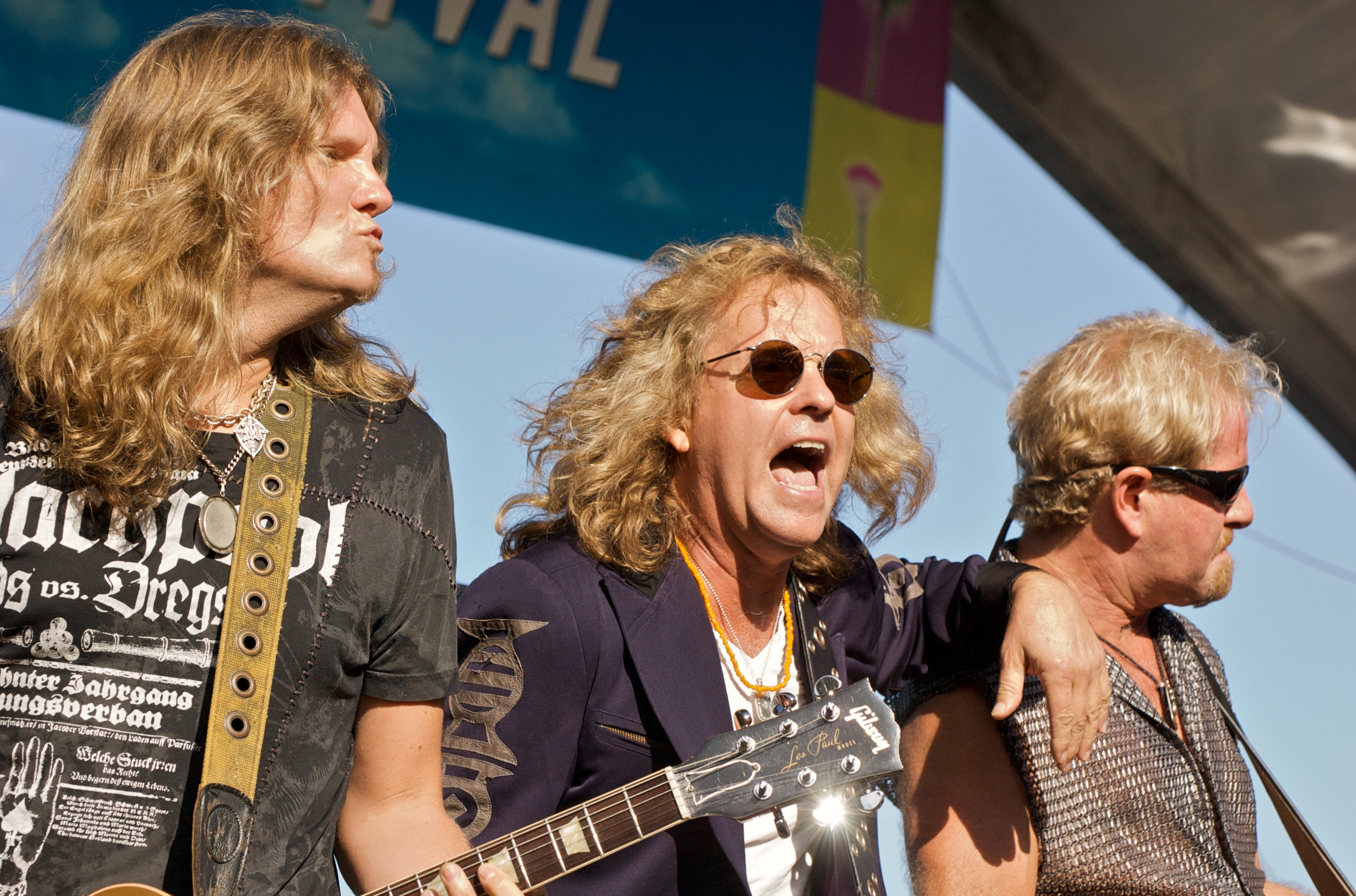
Night Ranger live at Sausalito Art Festival 2009

In 2003, Fitzgerald once again left the band and was replaced by Great White rhythm guitarist/keyboardist Michael Lardie. Fitzgerald went on to handle offstage keyboards for Van Halen as he had previously done in the 90's.

The band recorded their next album Hole in the Sun in 2007, which was released overseas in April of that year, but did not appear in the US until July 2008. After working on the album, Watson was fired from the band. Details of the separation have not been made public, but the band made a statement following a post by Watson regarding the split:

"We are shocked and saddened to learn of Jeff Watson's comments regarding his departure from Night Ranger. There are four sides to this story our three are the same; only Jeff's is different. While we don't want to get into details at this point in time, we are all truly sorry that our significant and continuing differences with Jeff could not be worked out. Still, we wish Jeff nothing but success in all of his future endeavors and are grateful for his positive contributions in the past."

Watson's replacement for the remainder of their 2007 tour was Winger/Whitesnake guitarist Reb Beach. After the tour, Lardie and Beach returned to their main bands. Christian Matthew Cullen replaced Lardie while Joel Hoekstra took over for Beach by early 2008. Hoekstra was also a member of Trans-Siberian Orchestra and performed in the Broadway production of Rock of Ages concurrently with his membership in Night Ranger.

In January 2008, the band played a special show in Guantanamo Bay, Cuba for U.S. Navy and Marine troops stationed on the island.

=== 2011–present ===
In early 2011, Cullen was replaced by Garaj Mahal keyboardist Eric Levy in time for the recording of the band's new album Somewhere in California. The song "Growin' Up in California" was released as a single and the band took part in a summer package tour that included Journey and Foreigner. Night Ranger guitarist Joel Hoekstra also did double duty for a stretch of the tour filling in for Mick Jones of Foreigner on several shows.

On March 25, 2012, they gave an a cappella performance of the Star-Spangled Banner before the NASCAR Sprint Cup race at Auto Club Speedway in Fontana, California.

In May 2012, the band celebrated the 30th anniversary of their debut album Dawn Patrol by recording 24 Strings and a Drummer as both a live DVD and album in an intimate, all-acoustic setting in front of a select number of fans at TRI Studios in San Rafael, California. The CD/DVD features some of their greatest hits, such as "(You Can Still) Rock in America" and "Sister Christian", in new acoustic arrangements. The live acoustic album consists of 12 songs plus a bonus track.

On September 1, 2012, they performed as the headlining act for the "River Days" festival in Portsmouth, Ohio. Keyboardist Eric Levy was forced to miss this performance due to his wife giving birth. Brandon Ethridge (from the musicals Rock of Ages and We Will Rock You) handled the keyboards for this performance.

In late 2012, guitarist Keri Kelli (whose resume includes stints with Alice Cooper, Slash, Skid Row, Vince Neil Band, Ratt, Warrant, L.A. Guns, Tal Bachman, John Waite, and others) filled in for Joel Hoekstra while he was playing with Trans-Siberian Orchestra. He did the same in late 2013.

They released their 11th studio album, High Road on June 10, 2014. A deluxe edition includes a bonus track and a DVD of music videos and behind-the-scenes extras. Hoekstra left the band in August to join Whitesnake alongside former Night Ranger touring guitarist Reb Beach. Keri Kelli was then formally hired as the permanent replacement for Hoekstra.

The band released a live DVD/double CD recording on December 2, 2016, on Frontiers Records celebrating the band's 35th anniversary. 35 Years and a Night in Chicago was recorded May 7, 2016, at the House of Blues in Chicago, Illinois. Included in the release was the new song "Day and Night". A second encore that night featured another new song, "Running Out of Time". Both songs were included on the band's next album Don't Let Up in March 2017, the first to include Keri Kelli on guitar. The single "Somehow Someway" preceded the album's release.

Night Ranger's latest studio album ATBPO was released on August 6, 2021.

== Musical style ==
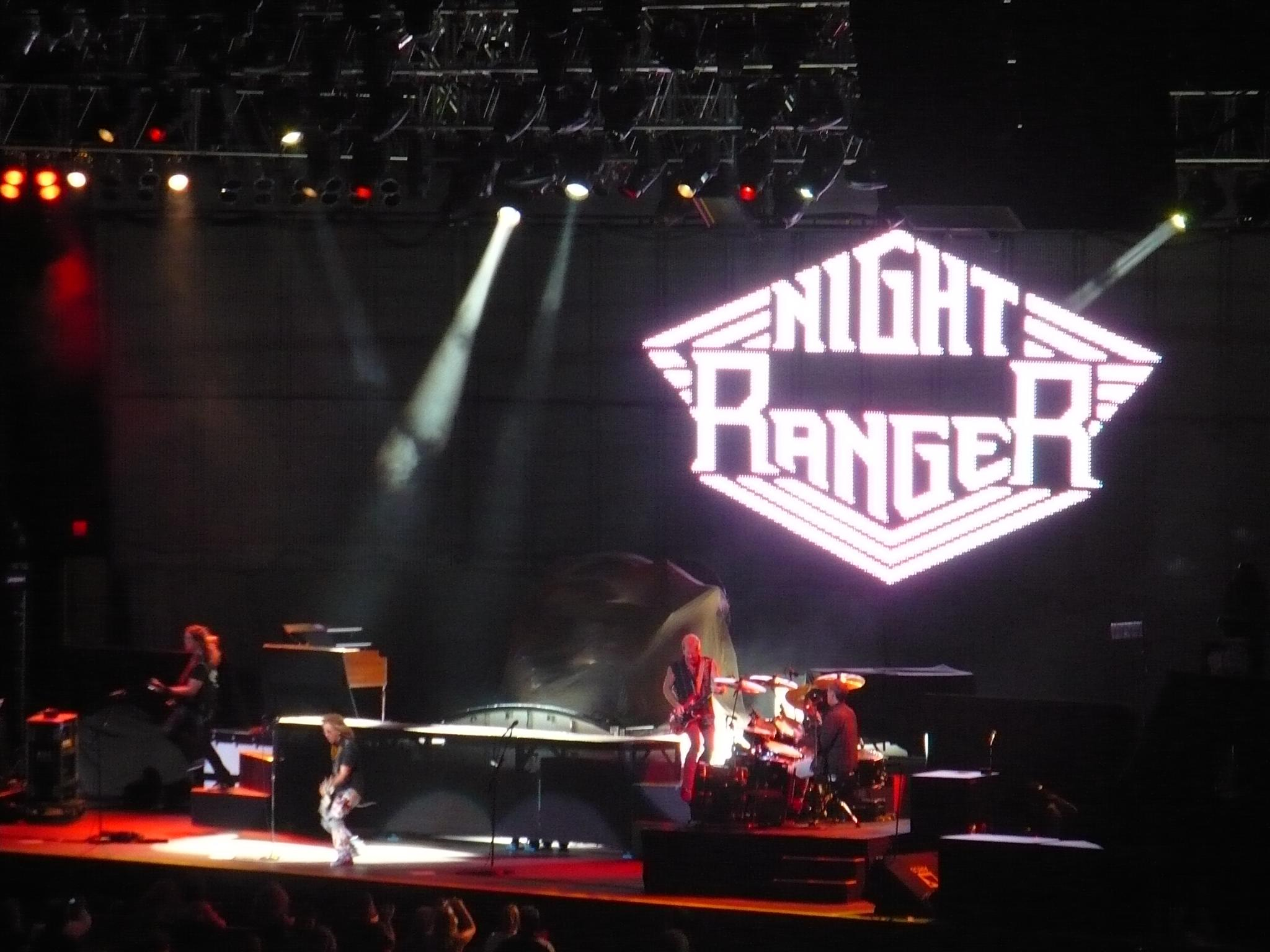
Night Ranger performing in 2009

Night Ranger's music is typically classified as hard rock, glam metal, and arena rock.

== Band members ==
Current members

- Kelly Keagy – drums, percussion, lead and backing vocals (1979–1989, 1991–present)
- Brad Gillis – lead and rhythm guitars, backing vocals (1979–1989, 1991–present)
- Jack Blades – bass, lead and backing vocals, rhythm and acoustic guitars (1979–1989, 1996–present)
- Eric Levy – keyboards, synthesizers, piano, backing vocals (2011–present)
- Keri Kelli – lead and rhythm guitars, backing vocals (2014–present; touring appearances in 2012 and 2013)

== Discography ==
=== Studio albums ===
- Dawn Patrol (1982)
- Midnight Madness (1983)
- 7 Wishes (1985)
- Big Life (1987)
- Man in Motion (1988)
- Feeding off the Mojo (1995)
- Neverland (1997)
- Seven (1998)
- Hole in the Sun (2007)
- Somewhere in California (2011)
- High Road (2014)
- Don't Let Up (2017)
- ATBPO (2021)
