= Jack Blades =

American musician (born 1954)

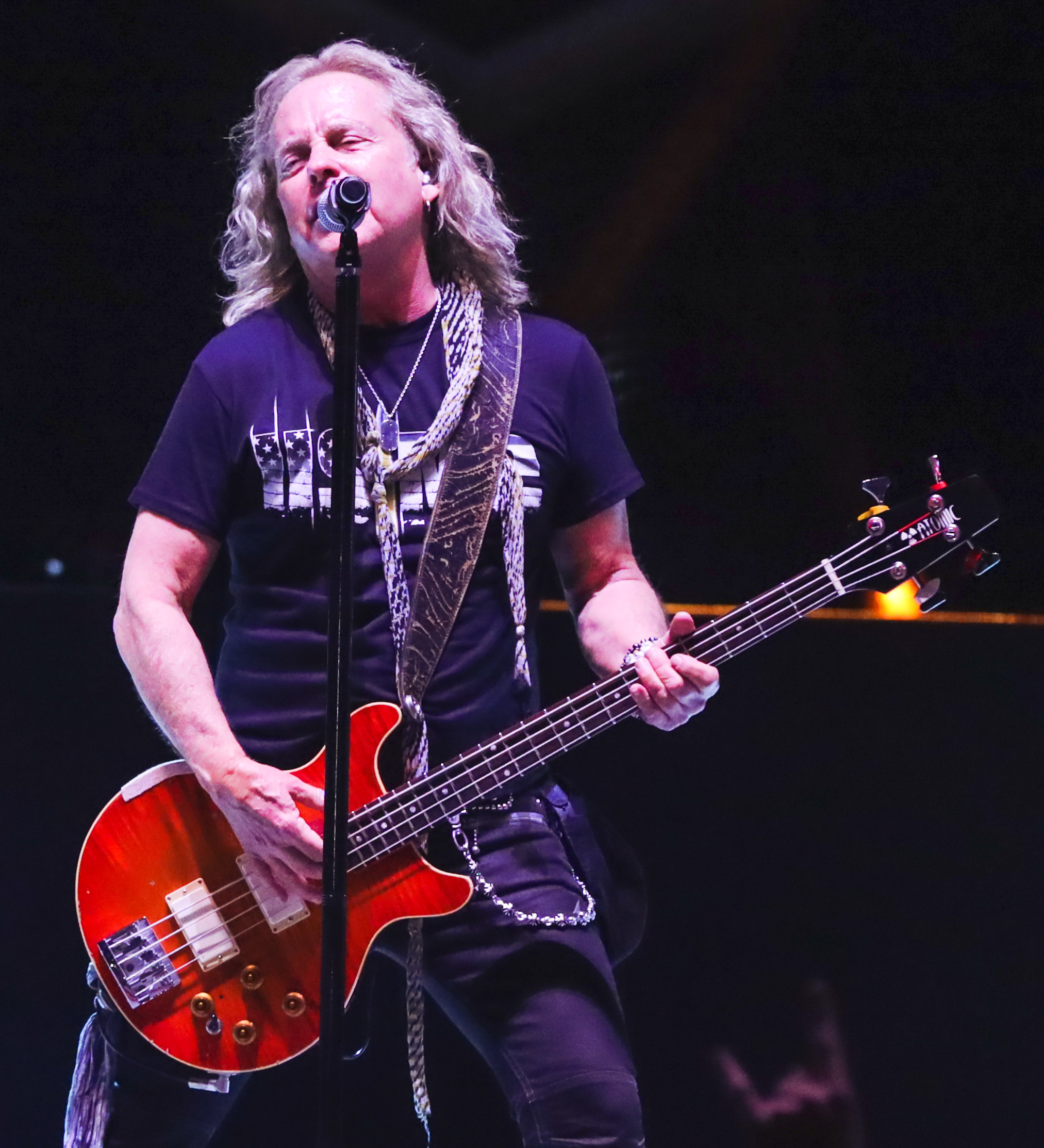
- Blades performing in 2022

Background information
- Born: Jack Martin Blades; April 24, 1954 (age 72); Palm Desert, California, U.S.
- Genres: Hard rock; heavy metal
- Occupation: Musician
- Instruments: Bass; guitar; vocals
- Years active: 1977–present
- Member of: Night Ranger; Shaw Blades; Tak Matsumoto Group
- Formerly of: Rubicon; Damn Yankees; Ted Nugent; Revolution Saints

Jack Martin Blades (born April 24, 1954) is an American rock musician. He has worked in the bands Rubicon, Night Ranger (as bassist and one of the lead vocalists), and Damn Yankees (as one of the founding members). He has also recorded with Tommy Shaw under the name Shaw Blades and has done work alongside the Tak Matsumoto Group. Blades' most recent efforts include a second solo album and three albums with Revolution Saints, which he was a member of until 2022.

== Personal life ==
Born in Palm Desert, California, Blades started playing guitar at eight years old when his parents gave him a plastic ukulele. He attended Arcadia High School (1968/69) in Scottsdale, Arizona, then graduated from Indio High School in 1972, where he was the senior class president. While attending College of the Desert in Palm Desert, he met and jammed with Pat Rizzo, then the sax player for Sly and the Family Stone, who introduced him to Jerry Martini, the original sax player for Sly. Blades went to college at San Diego State University as a pre-med student but dropped out in 1975 to move to San Francisco. Martini and Blades, as well as Brad Gillis, formed the band Rubicon.

One of Blades' sons, Colin, has co-written and performed songs with him and has also released his own solo material. Blades also has another son, James.

== Career ==
Blades has released two solo albums and has written or co-written songs for Aerosmith, Cher, Ozzy Osbourne, Alice Cooper, Roger Daltrey, and other artists. Blades has also produced or co-produced albums for Night Ranger, Shaw Blades, and several other artists including Great White, Ted Nugent, and Samantha 7, among others. Blades appears on Mötley Crüe's Dr. Feelgood album, which was released in 1989. In the 1990s, Blades co-wrote four Aerosmith songs with Steven Tyler, Joe Perry, and Tommy Shaw – "Shut Up and Dance" (1993), "Can't Stop Messin'" (1993), "Walk on Water" (1994), "What Kind of Love Are You On" (1998). In 1998, Blades was asked by Ringo Starr to play bass in Starr's VH1 Storytellers with Joe Walsh and Simon Kirke.

=== Rubicon ===
Former Sly and the Family Stone saxophonist Jerry Martini formed the funk band Rubicon with Blades as bass player and future fellow Night Ranger member Brad Gillis on guitar. The band recorded two albums on 20th Century Fox Records – Rubicon, and American Dreams. They had one hit single titled "I'm Gonna Take Care of Everything". They played Cal Jam 2, held at the Ontario Motor Speedway in California before 250,000 people. Rubicon broke up in 1979 and Blades formed the short-lived club band Stereo with Gillis and drummer Kelly Keagy, the latter of whom had joined as touring drummer for Rubicon.

=== Night Ranger ===
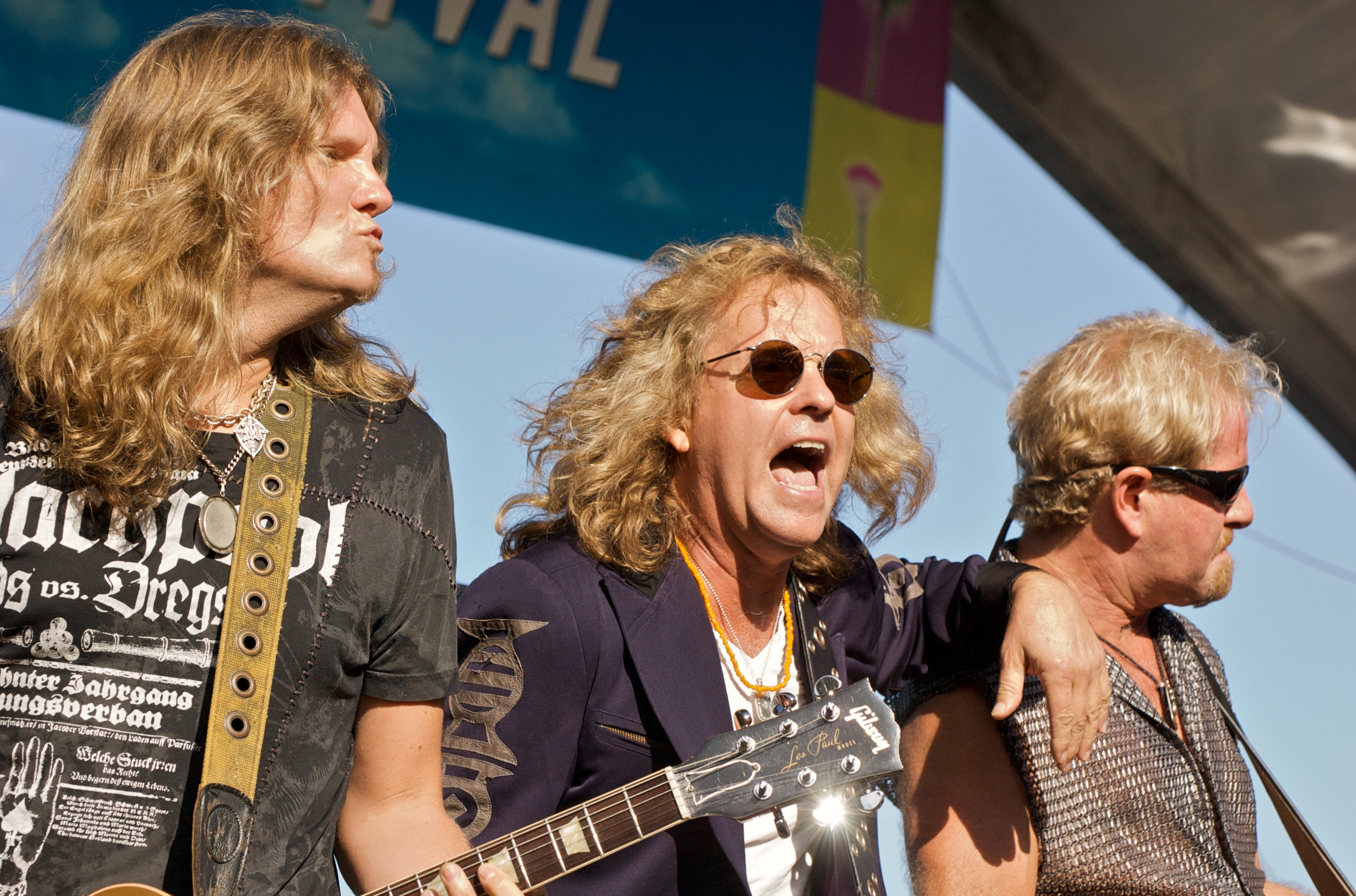
Blades (center) with Night Ranger in 2009.

Blades' roommate at the beginning of the '80s was Alan "Fitz" Fitzgerald, bass player for Montrose and Gamma and keyboard player for Sammy Hagar. He suggested they form a band. Fitz knew another guitar player in Sacramento, Jeff Watson, along with guitarist Gillis and Keagy, and Ranger was formed in 1980. The band recorded demos and played shows around the Bay area for two years. They were signed to Boardwalk Records and released their first album, Dawn Patrol in 1982. Prior to the release, it was discovered that there was a country band by the name of The Rangers. Blades had written the song "Night Ranger" for the album, so the band changed their name to Night Ranger to avoid any potential problems. Night Ranger went on through the '80s releasing albums that sold by the millions, as well as several hit singles. The band toured constantly both in the US and in Japan, where they continue to be popular today. In 1989, Blades left Night Ranger and formed the Damn Yankees. Blades re-formed Night Ranger with the original members in 1996. They recorded three albums – Neverland in 1997, Seven in 1998, and Hole in the Sun in 2008. Night Ranger continues to tour today.

=== Damn Yankees ===
In 1989, Damn Yankees was co-founded by Blades, Ted Nugent, and Styx guitarist Tommy Shaw. The band had multi-platinum success with two albums, Damn Yankees, Don't Tread, and a gold-selling single, "High Enough". They recorded and toured non-stop for four years. In 1996, Ted Nugent left the band to revive his solo career. Blades and bandmate Tommy Shaw continued to produce music as Shaw Blades. Although they have not released any new music since 1992 and have made sporadic appearances through the 2000s onstage, the band is considered to be on hiatus but "has met multiple times to meet and write over the years."

=== Shaw/Blades ===
After the Damn Yankees decided to take a break in 1994, Blades and Shaw decided to record together under the name Shaw Blades. They wrote and recorded the first album together, Hallucination, which was released in 1995. In 2007, they released Influence, which is a collection of cover songs that influenced them. Shaw Blades have toured acoustically across the US.

=== TMG (Tak Matsumoto Group) ===
In 2004, Blades recorded an album and toured Japan with Tak Matsumoto Group (TMG), formed by guitarist Tak Matsumoto of the Japanese band B'z. TMG scored a top 10 single ("Oh Japan ~Our Time Is Now~") and a No. 1 album (TMG I) on Oricon's domestic chart. With TMG, Blades performed "Never Good-Bye", the ending credits theme for the 2004 film Ultraman (a.k.a. Ultraman: The Next). The song appears on the 2005 soundtrack album for the movie and on TMG I. On February 28, 2024, in an interview with Rockpages.gr, Blades revealed that the band would be reforming. A week later, on March 8, the band officially announced its reformation, with a second album and a nationwide tour across Japan in the works.

=== Solo ===
Blades released his first solo album in 2004, Jack Blades. His second solo effort, Rock n' Roll Ride, followed in 2012.

=== Revolution Saints ===
In 2014, he formed the band Revolution Saints with Deen Castronovo of Journey and Doug Aldrich of Whitesnake. He performed on their first three albums, Revolution Saints, Light in the Dark, and Rise, but left in 2022, along with Aldrich.

=== Recent times ===
Blades continues to record new material with Night Ranger as they also still tour around the world. He also played at the Republican National Convention on August 29, 2012.

== Discography ==
=== Solo albums ===
- Jack Blades (2004)
- Rock 'n Roll Ride (2012)

=== with Rubicon ===
- Rubicon (1978)
- America Dreams (1979)

=== with Night Ranger ===
- Dawn Patrol (1982)
- Midnight Madness (1983)
- 7 Wishes (1985)
- Big Life (1987)
- Man in Motion (1988)
- Neverland (1997)
- Seven (1998)
- Hole in the Sun (2007)
- Somewhere in California (2011)
- High Road (2014)
- Don't Let Up (2017)
- ATBPO (2021)

=== with Damn Yankees ===
- Damn Yankees (1990)
- Don't Tread (1992)

=== with Shaw Blades ===
- Hallucination (1995)
- Influence (2007)

=== with Tak Matsumoto Group ===
- TMG I (2004)
- TMG II (2024)

=== with Revolution Saints ===
- Revolution Saints (2015)
- Light in the Dark (2017)
- Rise (2020)

=== Guest appearances ===
- California Jam II
- A Classic Rock Christmas
- Bat Head Soup: A Tribute to Ozzy
- Teachers
- Sixteen Candles
- Out of Bounds
- The Secret of My Success
- Nowhere to Run
- Nothing But Trouble
- Tommy Boy
- Ultraman
