= Brad Gillis =

American guitarist (born 1957)

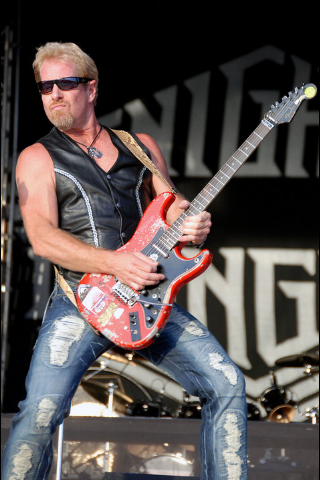
- Brad Gillis in 2012

Background information
- Born: Bradley Frank Gillis; June 15, 1957 (age 68); Honolulu, Hawaii
- Genres: Rock, hard rock, heavy metal
- Occupation: Musician
- Instruments: Guitar, vocals, bass
- Years active: 1977–present
- Labels: MCA, Frontiers
- Website: www.bradgillis.com

Bradley Frank Gillis (born June 15, 1957) is an American guitarist most famous for playing with the band Night Ranger. He grew up in Alameda, California. He was in the band Rubicon during the 1970s before Night Ranger. Since forming in 1979, Gillis and drummer Kelly Keagy are the only members to have appeared in every incarnation of the band and all studio releases. However, Keagy missed several shows for the first time in 2017. On Saturday, 8 May 2021, Gillis was absent from a Night Ranger show for the first time in the band's history (he was recovering from rotator cuff surgery). He has also played for Ozzy Osbourne and Fiona, and has released solo albums. Gillis' musical side projects include placing over 300 songs for ESPN's Sports Center, The X Games, Fox Sports, Tiger Woods Sony PlayStation Games, EA Sports, The Fuse Channel and many others. He has appeared in over a dozen music videos, with TV performances on American Bandstand, Solid Gold, Rock & Roll Tonight and thousands of live concerts. He also participated in the one-time collaboration, Hear 'n Aid, for the promotional single, "We're Stars," which helped raise $1 million for famine relief in Africa. He was one of several lead guitarists to contribute guitar solos for the cause, including Vivian Campbell, Buck Dharma, and Neal Schon. His first solo album Gilrock Ranch produced a top twenty single, "Honest to God", which was co-written and sung by Gregg Allman.

In 2025, Gillis had his guitar parts featured on a new, completely reworked mix of the Mephisto Odyssey track "Crash", released in December 2025. It also features new vocal stems by Wayne Static of Static X, who had previously appeared on the original version of the track.

== Career ==
=== 1978–1979: Rubicon ===
Jerry Martini formed the funk rock band Rubicon with future Night Ranger founding members Gillis and Jack Blades. Rubicon recorded two albums on 20th Century Fox Records – Rubicon, and American Dreams, scoring one minor hit single entitled "I’m Gonna Take Care of Everything". Rubicon played the 1978 California Jam II rock festival before 250,000 people. Future Ozzy Osbourne bandmate Rudy Sarzo saw Gillis's Cal Jam performance and was very impressed. Rubicon broke up in 1979 and Gillis formed the short-lived club band Stereo with future Night Ranger members Blades and Kelly Keagy.

=== 1982: Ozzy Osbourne ===
With the sudden death of guitarist Randy Rhoads in a plane crash while on tour in March 1982, Bernie Torme was quickly brought in as his replacement. After a handful of shows it became apparent that Torme's blues-based style was not a good match for Osbourne's style of music and Gillis was subsequently hired as his replacement. Osbourne, drinking heavily while still coming to terms with the loss of Rhoads, took his frustrations out on Gillis and treated him very poorly. As a result, Gillis left Osbourne's band after completing the 1982 Diary of a Madman tour and he returned to Night Ranger. Gillis can be heard playing guitar on Osbourne's 1982 Speak of the Devil live album and on the DVD of the same title.

== Equipment ==
Over the course of his career, Gillis has used several different models of guitars by various brands. He has been a longtime user of his 1962 Fender Stratocaster and 1971 Gibson Les Paul, and in the 1980s played Hamer and Jackson Soloists, which he still periodically uses today. He also has an extensive collection of over 100 various vintage guitars, most notably Les Pauls, Flying V's, and Martin and Gibson acoustics. Today he uses his Fernandes Brad Gillis model, along with his 1962 Stratocaster, PRS 513 model and an Atomic Guitars Red, White and Blue American flag guitar. Gillis uses Taylor acoustic guitars in the studio and live with his band Night Ranger. Gillis's amplifiers are mainly Mesa Boogie but also uses Soldano, Marshall and vintage Fender amps in the studio. Gillis uses original Floyd Rose non fine tuner tremolo bridges, Nady built-in wireless systems and metal picks by Star Access Guitar Picks.

== Brad Gillis Guitars and the "Bubba" Replica ==
In recent years, Gillis collaborated with Art of Guitar product developer Jim Cara to launch Brad Gillis Guitars, a venture dedicated to producing exact technical replicas of his famous "Bubba" guitar—the naturally distressed 1962 Fender Stratocaster he began playing upon joining Ozzy Osbourne's band in 1982. The partnership began when Cara approached Gillis with a prototype replica of the iconic instrument. Gillis subsequently worked closely with Cara to educate him on the inner workings and specific aesthetics of the original guitar, including its unique booster preamp and first-generation non-fine-tuner Floyd Rose tremolo system.

In an interview with Vintage Guitar magazine, Gillis discussed the project's authenticity, stating that Cara's builds were the only replicas he authorized, noting that the craftsmanship was so precise they were virtually indistinguishable from his original stage-worn instrument. The technical partnership and the creation of the replica line were also featured in the PBS documentary Jim Cara: Guitar Builder to the Stars, which documented the specific engineering challenges in recreating the "Bubba" aesthetics and performance specs for the modern market.

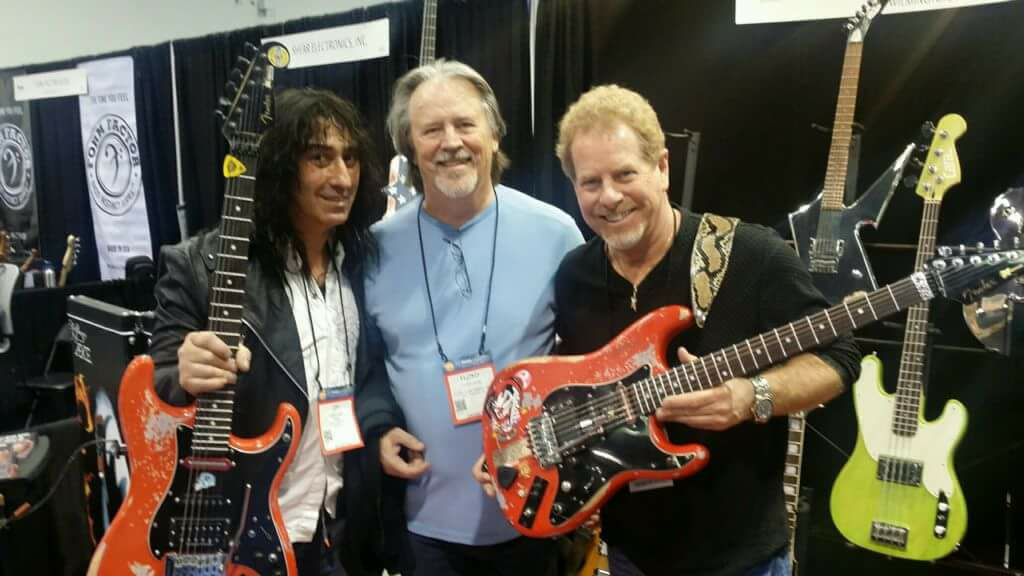
2014 NAMM Introduction of Gillis Original Floyd Rose Saddles

Cara worked with Doug Kennedy Machining to create the Holy Grail original Saddles that Floyd Rose originally made out of his own garage. These parts are unavailable and only used on Brad Gillis personal Guitars and High-End player replicas. These saddles were introduced to Floyd Rose at the 2014 NAMM Show in Anaheim California. They were also featured in the March 2017 issue of Music Trades magazine.

=== Original Floyd Rose Saddles Manufactured and Used by Brad Gillis ===
You will notice the Camel hump above the string perch as well as a river sliced though the saddle to give a complete Half-Moon bend around the saddle. This extra length enables critical pitch changes that Gillis has developed.

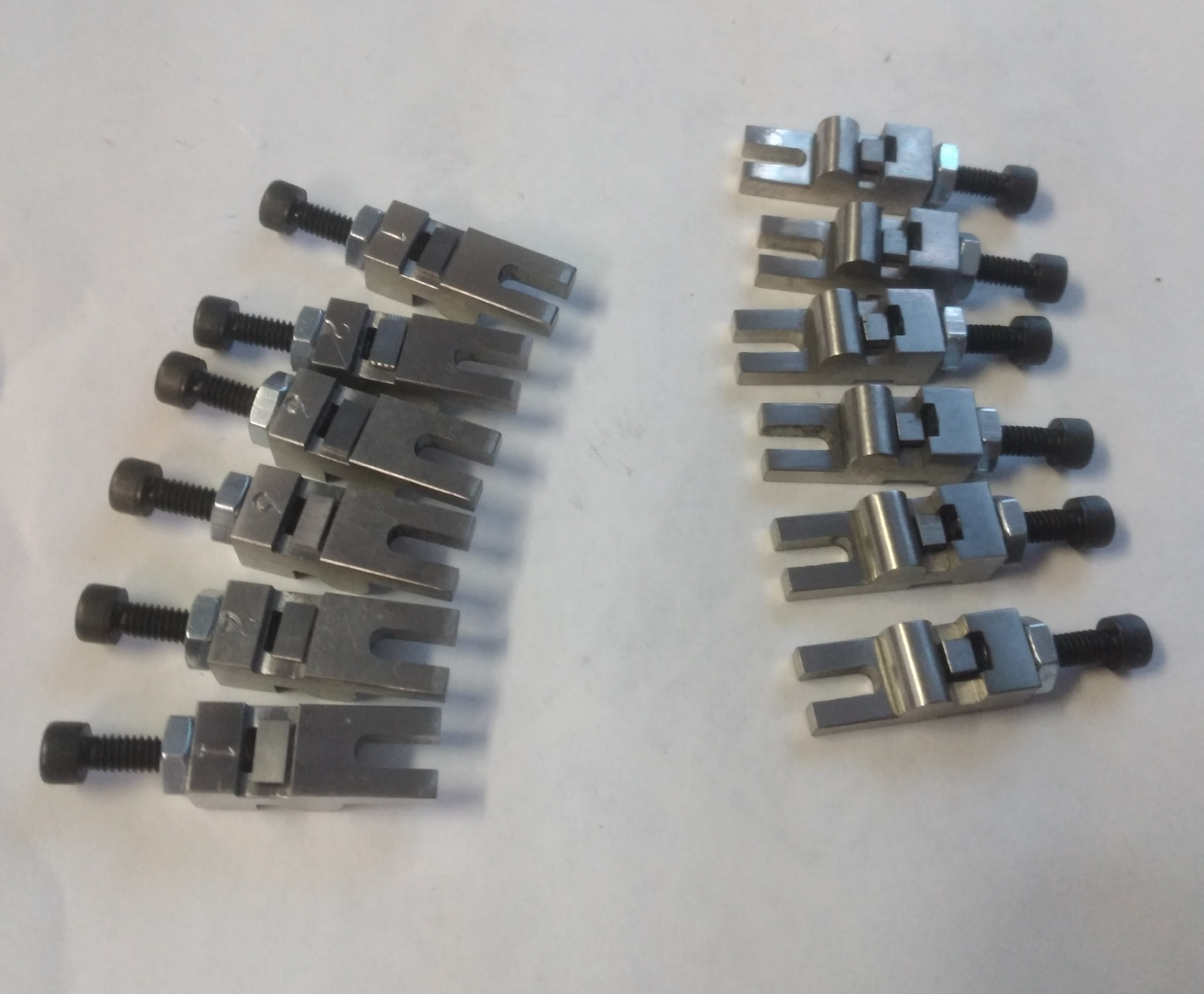
Gillis Manufacturing - Original Floyd Rose Garage Saddles

=== Fernandes Guitar Replicas ===
Brads association with Fernandes Guitars produced an official Brad Gillis model in the 1980w. Brad still uses extremely modified versions of the Fernandes in live performances. Owners of these Fernandes guitars often contact the Gillis company to have them converted to current Vintage Specs

== Discography ==
=== Solo albums ===
- Gilrock Ranch (1993)
- Alligator (2000)

=== with Rubicon ===
- Rubicon (1978)
- America Dreams (1979)

=== with Night Ranger ===
- Dawn Patrol (1982)
- Midnight Madness (1983)
- 7 Wishes (1985)
- Big Life (1987)
- Man in Motion (1988)
- Feeding off the Mojo (1995)
- Neverland (1997)
- Seven (1998)
- Hole in the Sun (2007)
- Somewhere in California (2011)
- High Road (2014)
- 35 Years and One Night in Chicago (2015)
- Don't Let Up (2017)
- ATBPO (2021)
- Night Ranger - 40 Years And A Night (With Contemporary Youth Orchestra)(2023)

=== with Ozzy Osbourne ===
- Speak of the Devil (1982)

=== with Hear 'n Aid ===
- Stars (1985)

=== with Fiona ===
- Heart Like a Gun (1989)

=== with Vicious Rumors ===
- Warball (2006)

=== Guest appearances ===
- TMN – Rhythm Red (1990)
- Derek Sherinian – Blood of the Snake (2006)
- Vicious Rumors – Razorback Killers (2011)
- Queensrÿche – Frequency Unknown (2013)
- Mephisto Odyssey - Crash (2025)

=== Instructional videos ===
- Star Licks Productions (1986)
