= Jeff Watson (guitarist) =

American musician

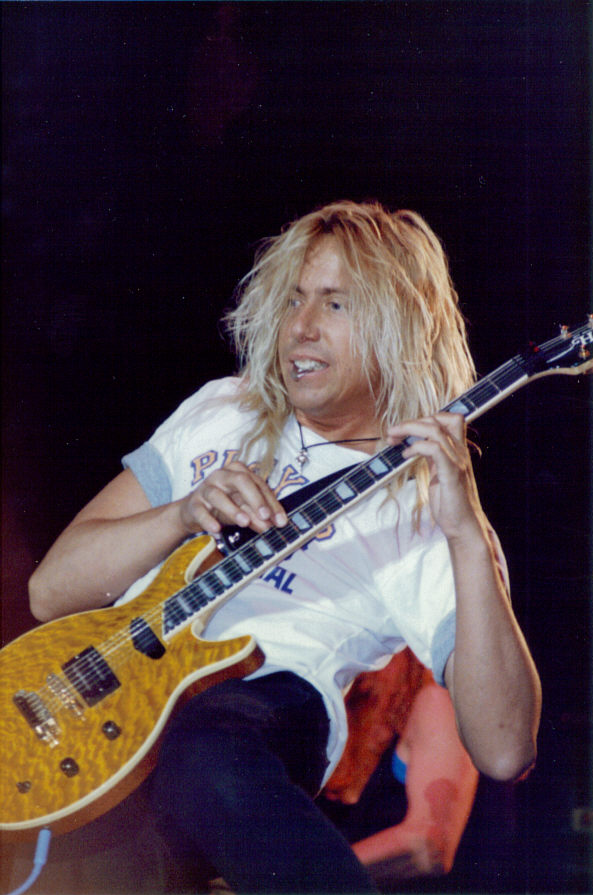
- Watson in 1993

Background information
- Born: Jeffrey Victor Watson; November 5, 1956 (age 69); Sacramento, California, U.S.
- Genres: Rock, hard rock
- Occupations: Musician, songwriter
- Instrument: Guitar
- Years active: 1982–present
- Formerly of: Night Ranger, Mother's Army

Jeffrey Victor Watson (born November 5, 1956) is an American guitarist originally known as one of the founding members and lead guitarist of the hard rock band Night Ranger, in which he has played as co-guitarist with guitarist Brad Gillis. Watson developed his signature eight-fingered tapping technique during his time in the band.

Watson appeared as a special guest on Douglas Docker's Docker's Guild project. He has also released solo albums. In 2007, he was fired by the three other members of Night Ranger through a letter from their attorney. During 2009, he was part of Dennis DeYoung's travelling band.

== Discography ==
=== Solo albums ===
- Lone Ranger (1992)
- Around the Sun (1993)

=== Night Ranger ===
- Dawn Patrol (1982)
- Midnight Madness (1983)
- 7 Wishes (1985)
- Big Life (1987)
- Man in Motion (1988)
- Neverland (1997)
- Seven (1998)
- Hole in the Sun (2007)

=== Mother's Army ===
- Mother's Army (1993)
- Planet Earth (1997)
- Fire on the Moon (1998)

=== Guest appearances ===
Year	Artist	Album
1987	Tony MacAlpine	Maximum Security
1989	Guitar's Practicing Musicians	Compilation
1991	Steve Morse	Southern Steel
1993	Chris Isaak	San Francisco Days
1995	Chris Isaak	Forever Blue
2002	Steve Wolverton	Guitar Farm
2003	Michael Schenker Group	Arachnophobiac
2004	Eric Martin	Destroy All Monsters
2012	Docker's Guild	The Mystic Technocracy – Season 1: The Age of Ignorance
2016	D-Metal Stars	Metal Disney – track "I See the Light"

=== Instructional ===
In 1986, Watson released an instructional guitar video titled Jeff Watson: Star Licks Master Series for Star Licks Productions.
