= Ariel =

Ariel may refer to:

== Arts and media ==
=== Film and television ===
- Ariel Award, a Mexican Academy of Film award
- Ariel (1988 film), a Finnish film by Aki Kaurismäki
- Ariel (1992 film), a Russian film directed by Yevgeni Kotov
- Ariel (2025 film), a meta-narrative film directed by Lois Patiño
- ARIEL Visual and ARIEL Deluxe, a 1989 and 1991 anime video series based on the novel series by Yūichi Sasamoto
- "Ariel" (Firefly episode), a 2002 episode of Firefly
- "Ariel" (Once Upon a Time), a 2013 episode of Once Upon a Time
- Ariel (The Little Mermaid), a fictional character from Disney's 1989 animated film The Little Mermaid
- Ariel (TV series), a 2024 television series inspired by The Little Mermaid
- Ariel, a fictional planet visited in an episode of Space: 1999

=== Literature ===
==== Journals and magazines ====
- Ariel (newspaper), the in-house magazine of the BBC
- Ariel: The Book of Fantasy, a periodical published in the 1970s in book form
- Ariel (campus newspaper), a former campus newspaper at the University of Minnesota
- Ariel, a comedic newspaper by Israel Zangwill

==== Novels ====
- Ariel (novel), a 1941 science fiction novel by Alexander Beliaev
- Ariel (novel series), a 1986 science fiction novel series by Yūichi Sasamoto
- Ariel, a 1983 post-apocalyptic fantasy by Steve Boyett

==== Poetry ====
- "Ariel" (poem), 1965, by Sylvia Plath
  - Ariel (poetry collection), a 1965 collection of poetry by Sylvia Plath containing the eponymous poem
- T. S. Eliot's Ariel poems, a series of poems by T. S. Eliot

==== Other literature ====
- Ariel (The Tempest), a character in the play The Tempest by William Shakespeare
- Ariel (essay), a 1900 work by José Enrique Rodó
- Ariel, a 1923 biography of Percy Bysshe Shelley by André Maurois

=== Music ===
==== Performers ====
- Ariel (Australian band)
- Ariel (DJ), DJ and record producer
- Ariel (Russian band)

==== Albums ====
- Ariels (album), 2004, by Bent
- Ariel, an EP by Alpha

==== Songs ====
- "Ariel" (song), 1977, by Dean Friedman
- "Ariel", by Anathema from Distant Satellites
- "Ariel", by Babes in Toyland from Nemesisters
- "Ariel", by Diane Birch from Bible Belt
- "Ariel", by Braid from Frame & Canvas
- "Ariel", by the Cure from The Top
- "Ariel", by Rainbow from Stranger in Us All

==== Classical works ====
- Ariel, a 1971 vocal work by Ned Rorem
- Ariel, a ballet by Roberto Gerhard

== Naval vessels ==
- Ariel-class gunboat, a class of Royal Navy gunboats
- HMS Ariel, numerous Royal Navy ships and a training shore establishment
- USS Ariel, various US Navy ships

== Places ==
- Ariel (Israeli settlement), in the central West Bank
- Lake Ariel, Pennsylvania, US, a village and lake
- Ariel, Washington, US, an unincorporated community
- Ariel (moon), a moon of Uranus

== Transport ==
=== Cars and motorbikes ===
- Ariel (American automobile)
- Ariel Motor Company, a modern British car company
- Ariel Motorcycles, a former manufacturer of motorcycles, bicycles, and cars, including a car of the same name

=== Ships ===
- Ariel (clipper), a British clipper ship
- Ariel (schooner), a 4-masted schooner built by Matthew Turner
- ST Ariel, a tugboat
- HMS Ariel, a list of ships of the Royal Navy
- USS Ariel, a list of ships of the US Navy

=== Other uses in transport ===
- List of GWR broad gauge locomotives, Great Western Railway Broad Gauge 2-2-2, 'Ariel' 1837
- Sud-Ouest Ariel, a light helicopter built in France

== Other uses ==
- Ariel (angel) (Hebrew: אֲרִיאֵל, romanized: ʾÁrīʾēl), angel featured primarily in Jewish and Christian mysticism and apocrypha
- Ariel (name), a given name (including a list of people and characters with the name)
- Ariel (detergent), a fabric care brand
- ARIEL, an ESA space mission to study exoplanet atmospheres
- The Ariel, a pair of apartment buildings on Broadway, New York City
- Ariel programme, a British satellite research programme
- Ariel School, an independent school in Ruwa, Zimbabwe
- Ariel University, an Israeli university
- Operation Ariel, the British military evacuation from western France in World War II
- Dorcas gazelle, also known as an Ariel gazelle
- Ariel (moon), a moon of Uranus

== See also ==
- Aerial (disambiguation)
- Airiel, a band
- Ari (lion)
- Ari (name)
- Aril, the coating of a plant seed
- Arial, a typeface
- Arielle (given name)
