= Ariella =

Ariella is the female version of the gender neutral Hebrew name Ariel. Ariela is an alternative spelling. Ariel means "Lion of God" in Hebrew.

Ariella may refer to:

- Ariella Arida (born 1988), Filipino actress, Miss Universe Philippines 2013
- Ariella Azoulay (born 1962), author, art curator, filmmaker, theorist of photography and visual culture
- Ariella Käslin (born 1987), Swiss artistic gymnast
- Ariela Massotti (born 1985), Brazilian actress
- Ariella Rush (born 1956), American professional ballroom dancer

In fiction:

- Ariella I of Furstan-Festil, sister and lover of King Imre in the Deryni novels by Katherine Kurtz
- Supergirl (Ariella Kent), the Supergirl of the 853rd century

== See also ==
- Ariella (gastropod), genus of minute sea snails
- Arella
- Ariel (disambiguation)
- Arielle (disambiguation)
- Arielli
- Uriella
