= Aeriel =

Aeriel may refer to:

- Aeriel Stiles, guitarist and songwriter with American hard rock band Pretty Boy Floyd

== See also ==
- Aerial (disambiguation)
- Ariel (disambiguation)
