= Aerial =

Aerial (from Latin: āerius and Ancient Greek: ἀήρ, 'air') or Aerials may refer to:

== Arts and entertainment ==
=== Music ===
- Aerial (Canadian band)
- Aerial (Scottish band)
- Aerial (Swedish band)
- Aerial (album), by Kate Bush, 2005, and the title track
- "Aerials" (song), by System of a Down, 2002

=== Other uses in arts and entertainment ===
- Aerial (magazine), a poetry magazine
- Aerials (film), a 2016 Emirati science-fiction film

== Other uses ==
- Antenna (radio), or aerial
- Television antenna, or aerial
- Aerial (dance move), in Lindy Hop or Boogie Woogie
- Aerial (skateboarding), a type of skateboarding trick
- Aerial, Georgia, a place in the United States

== See also ==
- Air (disambiguation)
- Arial, a sans-serif typeface
- Ariel (disambiguation)
- Airiel, an American shoegaze band
- Airborne (disambiguation)
- Area (disambiguation)
- Aviation
- Flight
- Aerobatics
