= Pretty Boy Floyd (disambiguation) =

Pretty Boy Floyd (1904–1934) was an American bank robber.

Pretty Boy Floyd may also refer to:

- Pretty Boy Floyd (American band), a glam metal band formed in 1987
- Pretty Boy Floyd (Canadian band), a hard rock band 1987–1990
- Pretty Boy Floyd (film), a 1960 biographical film about the bank robber
- "Pretty Boy Floyd", a song by Woody Guthrie from Dust Bowl Ballads, 1964 RCA reissue

== People with the nickname ==
- Jimmy Mataya, American pool player
- Floyd Mayweather Jr. (born 1977), American boxer
