= Arielle =

Arielle may refer to:

- Arielle (given name), list of people with the name
- MS Arielle, a cruise ship now under the name MV Ocean Star Pacific

== See also ==
- Ariel (disambiguation)
