= A Tale of Sex, Designer Drugs, and the Death of Rock n' Roll =

EP by Pretty Boy Floyd
- Released: 1998
- Genre: Glam metal, hard rock
- Label: Perris Records
- Producer: Kerilynn Kelly; Kristy "Krash" Majors

Pretty Boy Floyd chronology
Leather Boyz with Electric Toyz (1989)	A Tale of Sex, Designer Drugs, and the Death of Rock n' Roll (1998)	Porn Stars (1999)

A Tale of Sex, Designer Drugs, and the Death of Rock n' Roll is a 1998 EP released by the American rock band Pretty Boy Floyd. It was the second release since their 1989 debut album. On this EP, Keri Kelli joined as second guitarist and Keff Ratcliffe replaced Vinnie Chas on bass.

"Everybody Needs a Hero" is a cover of a song by Keri Kelli's previous band Big Bang Babies.

A re-recorded version of "Good Girl Gone Bad" appears on Pretty Boy Floyd's next album Porn Stars.

The EP cover is a parody of the 1995 film The Usual Suspects.

== Track listing ==
1. "Shut Up" (Keri Kelli)
2. "Junkie Girl" (Kelli)
3. "Everybody Needs a Hero" (Big Bang Babies cover) (Kelli)
4. "Do You Love Me" (Kelli)
5. "Good Girl Gone Bad" (Kristy "Krash" Majors)

== Personnel ==
Pretty Boy Floyd

- Steve "Sex" Summers – vocals
- Kristy "Krash" Majors – lead guitar
- Keri Kelli – rhythm guitar
- Keff Ratcliffe – bass
- Kari Kane – drums

Production

- Kerilynn Kelly – production, engineering, mixing
- Kristy "Krash" Majors – executive production
- Kevin Perttula – photography
