= Lion of God =

Lion of God may refer to:

- Ariel (name), a Hebrew given name meaning "Lion of God"
  - Ariel (angel), an angel in Judaism and Christianity
- Asadullah, an Arabic given name meaning "Lion of God"
  - Hamza ibn Abd al-Muttalib (c. 568–625), Arab Muslim military commander
  - Ali ibn Abi Talib (c. 600–661), 4th Rashidun caliph and 1st Shia imam
- Lion of God Ministry, a Latter Day Saint denomination
