= Stormy Atmosphere =

Progressive metal band

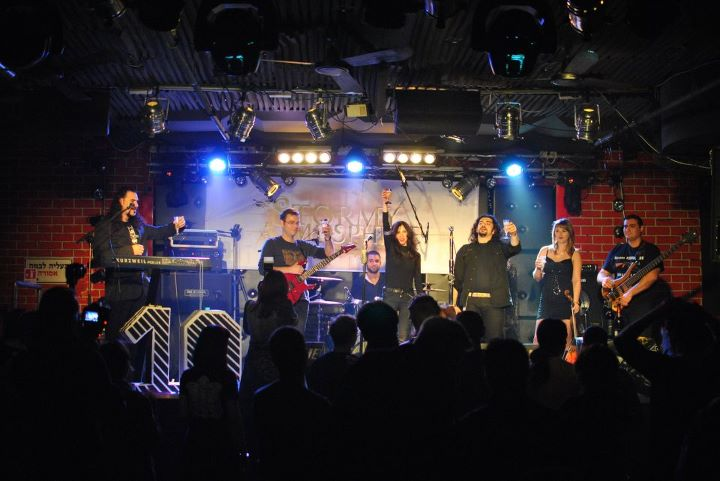
- 10-year anniversary show at Sublime Club, 2012

Background information
- Origin: Israel
- Genres: Progressive metal
- Members: Dina Tishler; Teddy Shvets; Edi Krakov; Igor Berg; Jess Shapiro; Aviv Zohar
- Website: stormyatmosphere.wix.com/stormyatmosphere

Stormy Atmosphere is a progressive metal band from Israel.

== Biography ==
Founded as a school rock-band in 1999 by Edi Krakov (keyboards, composing) and Teddy Shvets (vocals, lyrics), Stormy Atmosphere stepped into the progressive genre in 2002. Since then it has been self-promoted by the band members, setting shows and festivals with other local bands and several booking agencies. In 2009, the band released their debut album Colorblind.

In 2012, Stormy Atmosphere made it to the finals of the Israeli "Metal Battle" contest; the winning band went on to represent Israel that year at the annual Wacken Open Air festival. Later the same year, the band took part in the "ProgStage" festival in Israel, featuring Pain of Salvation and The Flower Kings, among other progressive bands. In December 2014, Stormy Atmosphere went on tour across Slovakia and Poland, with Mike Terrana and his band as the headliners. The concerts were in Nitra, Warsaw, Domecko and Krosno.

In April 2015, the band was invited to Georgia, to perform at Tbilisi JAM! Fest 2015, where they performed alongside Slot, Diary of Dreams, Vader, and many other bands. Stormy Atmosphere members were also asked to be a jury for the local "Metal Battle 2015" contest. In May 2015, Stormy Atmosphere signed up with Metal Scrap Records. The band's second album Pent Letters was released worldwide under the label on September 14, 2015. As a part of a promotion of the new album, Stormy Atmosphere made a tour across Ukraine between September 9 and October 4. They played in five cities: Kyiv, Kharkiv, Odesa, Kirovohrad and Kryvyi Rih. During the tour Stormy Atmosphere was supported by several local bands and a Greek band Sunlight. In October 2015, Stormy Atmosphere participated in the Melodic Alliance festival, in Tel Aviv, along with fellow Israeli metal acts Desert and Scardust, as well as international artists Airborn, Switchblade, Winter's Verge, and headliner Elvenking. In December 2016 the band participated in Melodic Alliance 2, this time with Serenity, Civil War, and, once again, Desert, who arranged the festival In December 2017 Stormy Atmosphere played three shows in Canada – two in Toronto and one in Ottawa. In December 2019 Stormy Atmosphere participated in a Hag HaOrPhanedLand Show, which occurred at the Reading 3, performing on the same stage with Orphaned Land. In September 2023 Stormy Atmosphere made a comeback show in a "Beit Hayotser", together with Vessel as an opening act, and Lousine Gevorkyan as a guest star

== Band members ==
- Dina Tishler – female vocals
- Teddy Shvets – male vocals, lyrics
- Edi Krakov – keyboards, composing
- Igor Berg – lead guitar
- Jess Shapiro – bass
- Aviv Zohar – drums

== Discography ==
=== Colorblind (2006–2009) ===
In 2006, Stormy Atmosphere members decided to record their first album, Colorblind. The main idea of the album is to show that since everyone has different perspectives, the real truth is hidden from the most. Some of the songs on the album were written during the band's early years, while others were made specifically for the album. Three years later, the band released the album, which was reissued in 2012 by the record label MALS, and in again in 2021. Colorblind has been noted and reviewed by several metal magazines and webzines in Israel and worldwide.

=== Pent Letters (2009–2015) ===
In 2009, Stormy Atmosphere began working on the second album, Pent Letters, a concept album, telling one story across all the songs. Tom Englund appears in the album as a guest star. The album was completed in October 2014 and released worldwide in September 2015 under Metal Scrap Records.

== Videography ==
No.	Year	Title	Type	Directed	Album
1.	2014	Historical Adventure	Music video	Guy First	Pent Letters
2.	2015	Gothic Dread	Lyric video	BVS Studio	Pent Letters
3.	2015	The Menippeah	Lyric video	BVS Studio	Pent Letters
4.	2018	Outcome	Music video	Michael Cao	Pent Letters
5.	2020	Hour	Music video	Jess Shapiro	Pent Letters
6.	2023	First Year	AI music video	Jess Shapiro	Pent Letters
7.	2023	Rewarlution	Music video	Jess Shapiro	New (not released yet)
