= Aeriel Stiles =

- Origin: Hollywood, California, United States
- Genres: Hard rock, glam metal
- Years active: 1982–present
- Labels: MCA; Mausoleum; Delinquent Records; Perris Records

Aeriel Stiles is an American guitarist from Hollywood, California.

== History ==
In 1985, Stiles joined the band Kery Doll, taking the bassist slot to score a gig. Two months later, Stiles moved to guitar and the band shortened the name to Doll. In 1986, the bass player Michael Hannon left to form Salty Dog and Doll dissolved.

Stiles co-founded the American glam metal band Pretty Boy Floyd and was the guitarist from 1986–1988, and 1991–1994. Stiles wrote 8 of the 11 songs that ended up the Pretty Boy Floyd debut Leather Boyz with Electric Toyz (1989) with the exception of the single “Rock and Roll (Is Gonna Set the Night on Fire)”, the Mötley Crüe cover “Toast of the Town” and “Slam Dunk” (Kevin DuBrow, Harry Perris) (released for the 1991 movie Switch and issued as a Japanese bonus track). Stiles has writing credit on most of their last album Public Enemies (2017) on tracks 2-8, 10-13 and 15. He also played guitar for several years for The Richard Berry Group. Richard Berry is best known as the songwriter of "Louie Louie" and "Have Love Will Travel." They often played as the house band for the L.A. Doo Wop Society, backing other famous singers of the genre.

== Stratosphere ==
In 1995 Aeriel Stiles created a band called "Stratosphere". The band was then forced to take nearly a year hiatus when Stiles suffered a back injury which required surgery. Afterwards, Stiles recorded an additional 10 songs at his home studio. They narrowed the 15 tracks down to 10 and released the CD "Time" in 1997. The band recruited drummer Jay Rezendes and bassist John Binkley in time to appear on the cover art, but the "Time" CD was already finished prior.

Stratosphere began playing regular shows in the L.A. area. Aeriel Stiles was nominated by Rock City News magazine for best guitarist for three consecutive years. Their live shows were a retro-hippie stage set which featured many lighting effects, including the use of invisible fluorescent paints which made Jeff Alpin's artwork banners and scrims reveal hidden images when the black lights came on. The band played its final live shows in 2002. The band eventually disbanded before its second CD was completed.

In 2003, Stiles, Purcell, and Rabatin formed the Psychedelic Blues Experience as a working cover band for about a year. In 2005, Stiles and Purcell joined up again and formed Throttlehold, an original metal band in the vein of Tool but with electronica elements. Stiles relocated to Nashville in 2006 and is in the process of forming another group.

== Recent times ==
From 2002 to 2007, Stiles created, performed and produced funny comedy songs and parodies for FOX Interactive, Flowgo, Madblast, Atom Films, and Loony Music. He has had the number one Internet file on all those networks at one time and often several times. His baby-voiced parodies have been downloaded in excess of 200 million times.

In 2007, he played on, re-arranged and produced a new track for Steve Summers of Pretty Boy Floyd called "Take You Down" which was written by Summers and Keri Kelli.

In 2007-2008, Stiles composed and produced 36 pieces of music, including the title track, for the film Sugar Boxx which will be released in June/July 2009. The film was written and directed by Cody Jarrett.

In 2008, Stiles composed the music and contributed voice-overs to the video game: Mr. Biscuits - The Case of the Ocean Pearl

In 2008, Stiles collaborated with vocalist Kery Doll and former Doll drummer Philip Geldray (a.k.a. Philip Dare) to play on and produce the Kery Doll song: "A child shall lead them." In 2011, they re-recorded several of the older Kery Doll songs and new material for a new release called Rock 'N Roll Freak Show, which included several Kery Doll former members, including Michael Hannon (a.k.a. Michael Alice), Steven Darrow (Guns N' Roses, Hollywood Rose), Kim Renee, Eloy, Keri Kelli, (Alice Cooper), as well as former Pretty Boy Floyd bassist Vinnie Chas. And included a duet version of 'Til Death Do Us Part featuring Bering Strait vocalist Lydia Salnikova.

Stiles currently works as a songwriter and producer in Nashville, Tennessee, doing production for radio jingles, songwriter demos and master tracks for film and television. He also teaches a comedy and humorous songwriting workshop at SongU.com. He has started a new as yet unnamed group with vocalist Rob Hill (who had previously recorded songs with Troy Stetina and Mark Tremonti (Creed) for an unreleased project).

== Endorsements ==
Aeriel Stiles is the demonstration guitarist for the effects pedals at the web sites for Guyatone & Maxon effects. He plays with his favorite pedals, Guyatone's metal monster, and Maxon's OD9 and SD9. Stiles also endorses Fisher Saturn V guitars.

== Discography ==
=== With Doll ===
- Demo Tape (1986)
- Rock 'N Roll Freak Show (2011)

=== With Pretty Boy Floyd ===
- Leather Boyz with Electric Toyz (1989) US No. 130 - uncredited writer on tracks 1, 3, 4 & 6-10, guitar on track 11
- The Vault (2002) - guitar, writer
- The Vault II (2003) - guitar, writer
- Tonight Belongs to the Young - Remastered demos (2003) - guitar, writer
- Public Enemies (2017) - writer on tracks 2-8, 10-13 and 15

=== With Rattlin' Bones ===
- Rattlin' Bones (1995)

=== With Stratosphere ===
Time (1997)
