= Solomon Kane =

Fictional character

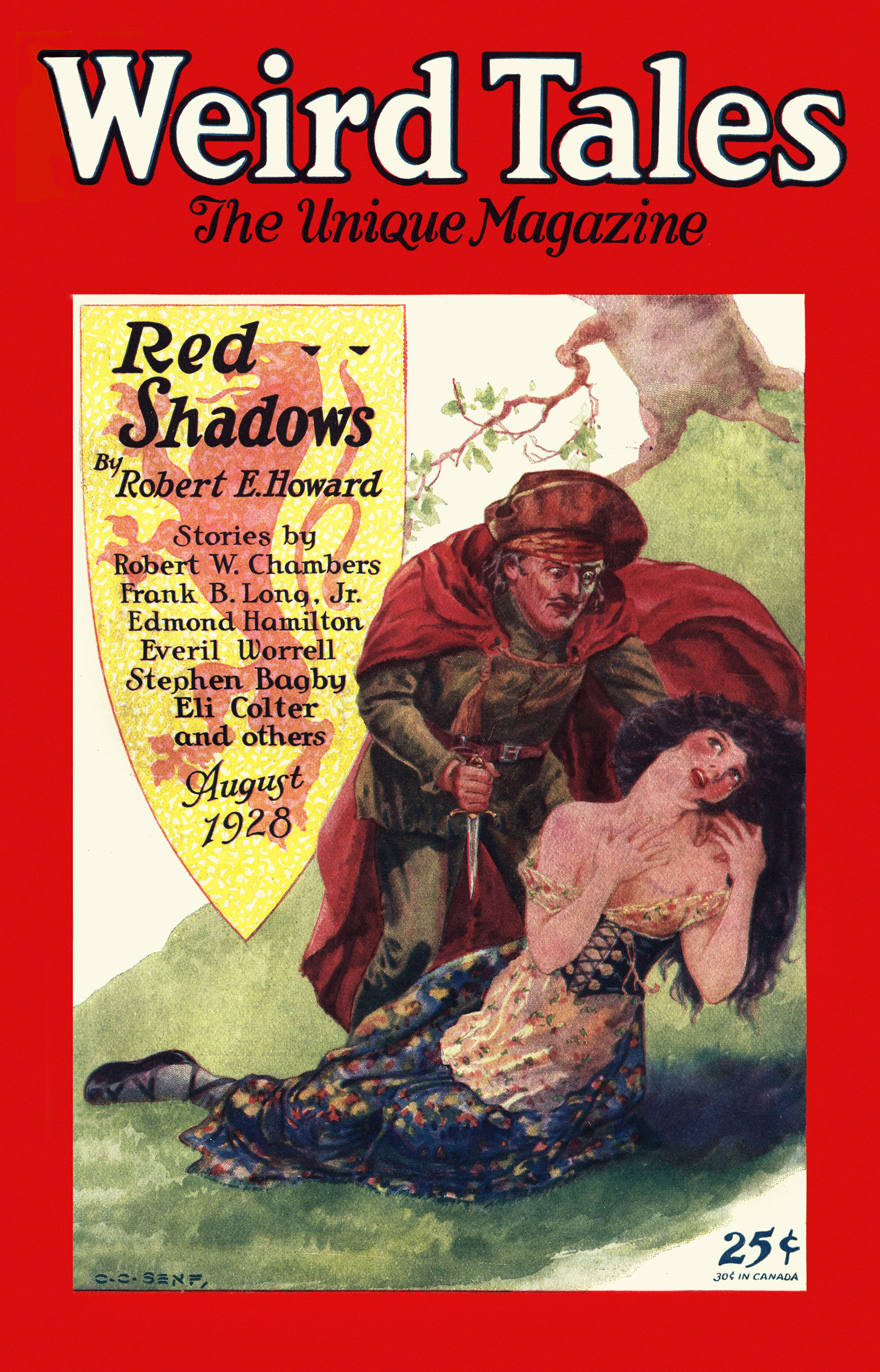
- Weird Tales, August 1928, the first appearance of Kane
- First appearance: "Red Shadows"
- Created by: Robert E. Howard
- Portrayed by: James Purefoy

In-universe information
- Species: Human
- Gender: Male
- Occupation: Adventurer
- Affiliation: Allies: N'Longa; John Silent; Enemies: Le Loup; The Fishhawk
- Weapon: Rapier; Dirk; Musket; Flintlock pistols; The Staff of Solomon
- Religion: Puritanism/Protestantism
- Origin: Kingdom of England
- Nationality: English

Solomon Kane is a fictional character created by the pulp-era writer Robert E. Howard. A late-16th-to-early-17th century Puritan, Solomon Kane is a somber-looking man who wanders the world with no apparent goal other than to vanquish evil in all its forms. His adventures, published mostly in the pulp magazine Weird Tales, often take him from Europe to the jungles of Africa and back.

When Weird Tales published a story featuring Conan the Barbarian, the editors introduced it by writing that "Its author, Robert E. Howard, is already a favorite with the readers of this magazine for his stories of Solomon Kane, the dour English Puritan and redresser of wrongs".

Solomon Kane was portrayed by James Purefoy in the film Solomon Kane in 2009. He has also been featured in a series of comics published by Marvel from 1973 to 1994, from 2008 to 2009 at Dark Horse Comics, and beginning again in 2025 with Titan Comics.

== Personality and character ==
In his story "Moon of Skulls", Robert E. Howard described Kane as "He was a man born out of his time — a strange blending of Puritan and Cavalier, with a touch of the ancient philosopher, and more than a touch of the pagan, though the last assertion would have shocked him unspeakably. An atavist of the days of blind chivalry he was, a knight errant in the somber clothes of the fanatic. A hunger in his soul drove him on and on, an urge to right all wrongs, protect all weaker things, avenge all crimes against right and justice."

Solomon Kane is a deeply devout Puritan. He is characterized by his fanaticism, unshakable faith, and religious zeal. His forename references King Solomon, who was righteous and wise. His morality is starkly black and white, allowing for no grey areas of uncertainty. To Kane, the wicked are wicked, and the righteous are righteous, with little between. His surname, Kane, is a reference to Cain, the Bible’s first murderer, and a hint towards Kane's dangerous nature and willingness to take other men's lives. Like Conan the Barbarian, Kane shows a keen sense of chivalry and propriety, defending the innocent and the weak from their wicked oppressors.

Kane lives on an endless odyssey to destroy evil and darkness in the name of God Almighty. He also seems to have little regard for his own life and safety, giving away years of his life to pursue and track down evildoers who deserved punishment. He is the archetypical wandering hero, seeking no reward for his actions.

== Appearance and equipment ==
Solomon Kane is a tall, sombre, and gloomy man with pale skin, gaunt face, and cold eyes. Kane is a Puritan Englishman, of the 16th century, who is often depicted with the stereotypical garb of his time and culture. He is dressed entirely in black. He wears a slouch hat, leather gloves, riding boots, a doublet, and cloak.

Kane is proficient in many different types of weapons, and his arsenal is incredibly varied. His main weapon is a Spanish rapier, since Kane is a master duelist and swordsman. In his off-hand, he often wields a dirk, a thrusting dagger of Scottish origin. Kane is also equipped with a brace of flintlock pistols. He also, on one occasion, uses a musket.

=== The Staff of Solomon ===
During one of his later adventures, his friend N'Longa, an African shaman, gave him a juju staff for protection against evil and to be wielded as a weapon. In "The Footfalls Within", it is the mythical Staff of Solomon.

It is an artifact that belonged to the Biblical monarch of Ancient Israel, Solomon. Before this, when the world was young, Atlantean and pre-Adamite priests in silent cities beneath the seas used the staff to fight evil, millions of years before mankind was born. The staff was older than the Earth and unimaginably powerful, more than even N'Longa knew. With the staff, Moses did wonders before the Pharaoh and carried it with him when his people fled Egypt. For centuries it was the Scepter of Israel (from Numbers 24:17), and Solomon used it to combat magicians or capture djinn. The staff may be Aaron's rod, Moses' rod, or the Rod of Asclepius.

It is carved from a wood that no longer exists on Earth. The staff is covered with ancient hieroglyphs and sharply pointed at one end, with the head of a cat on the other. The cat's head is a representation of Bast, and the priests of Bast used the staff in Ancient Egypt. The cat's head was carved out of an unknown pre-existing decoration and was added long after the staff was created.

Using the staff, Kane can communicate over distances with N'Longa. It has also been used to slay vampires and evil spirits. Having carried it for an extended period, it has endowed Kane with the ability to sense otherworldly beings. When Kane is taken prisoner by slavers, Yussef the Hadji recognizes it and says it is older than the world itself and holds mighty magic.

== Characters ==
=== N'Longa ===
He is an ancient shaman of pre-colonial Africa who is driven to study magic. He has traveled the world in ancient times as a slave, secretly studying under various sorcerers and holy men of the Middle and Near East. In Judea, he acquired the Staff of Solomon, which he later gave to Solomon Kane to aid him in his wanderings. N'Longa's magical powers derive from his ability to send his spirit out of his body. He can take over the bodies of the living and dead through this method to communicate with Solomon Kane through the Staff of Solomon, and he also summons vultures by sending his spirit to parley with them.

=== Le Loup ===
Meaning "The Wolf," Le Loup is a French criminal mastermind who, among many crimes, slaughtered an entire village. Kane found the dying girl who was the sole survivor, swearing to avenge her and her people. Kane tracks Le Loup for several years, eventually finding him in Africa. Justice is served after Kane kills him in a duel. This adventure is also where Kane first encounters N'Longa.

=== Jonas Hardraker ===
Hardraker is known on all coasts of the civilized world as a ruthless pirate. He is tall, rangy, and broad-shouldered, with a lean, cruel, hawk-like face, (possibly the reason he is known as "The Fishhawk"). Solomon Kane hunted him for two years after Hardraker sank a ship carrying the daughter of an old friend of Kane's, the old friend going insane after hearing of his daughter's death. Kane finally confronted and killed Hardraker in England, where Hardraker was smuggling alcohol in partnership with Sir George Banway.

== Works ==
Most of the Solomon Kane stories were first published in Weird Tales. Some stories were first published in a collection, also entitled Red Shadows, released posthumously. The order of publication, however, does not coincide with the order in which the stories were written.

Title	Date	Publication	Form	Summary
"Red Shadows"	1928, August	Weird Tales	Story	Alternatively titled "Solomon Kane". This was the first Solomon Kane story ever published. In France, Kane finds a girl attacked by a gang of brigands led by a villain known as le Loup. As she dies in his arms, Kane determines to avenge her death, and the trail leads from France to Africa, ending in Kane's first meeting with N'Longa.
"Skulls in the Stars"	1929, January	Weird Tales	Story	In England, Kane is on his way towards the hamlet of Torkertown and must choose one of two paths. One route leads through a moor, while the other leads through a swamp. He's warned that the moor route is haunted and all travelers who take this road die, so Kane decides to investigate.
"Rattle of Bones"	1929, June	Weird Tales	Story	In Germany, Kane meets a traveler named Gaston L'Armon, who seems familiar to Kane, and together they rent rooms at the Cleft Skull Tavern.
"The Moon of Skulls"	1930, June (Part 1)	Weird Tales	Story	Kane goes to Africa on the trail of an English girl named Marylin Taferal, kidnapped from her home and sold to Barbary pirates by her cousin. When Kane discovers the hidden city of Negari, he encounters Nakari, "The Vampire Queen of Negari".
"The Moon of Skulls"	1930, July (Part 2)	Weird Tales	Story	Kane goes to Africa on the trail of an English girl named Marylin Taferal, kidnapped from her home and sold to Barbary pirates by her cousin. When Kane discovers the hidden city of Negari, he encounters Nakari, "The Vampire Queen of Negari".
"Hills of the Dead"	1930, August	Weird Tales	Story	In Africa again, Kane's old friend N'Longa (the witch doctor from "Red Shadows") gives the Puritan a magic wooden staff, (later revealed as the Staff of Solomon), which will protect him during his travels. Kane enters the jungle and finds a city of vampires.
"The Footfalls Within"	1931, September	Weird Tales	Story	In Africa again, Kane encounters Arab slave traders busily engaged driving slaves to market. He rushes to save a girl whom the slavers are mistreating, but is himself overwhelmed and taken prisoner.
"Wings in the Night"	1932, July	Weird Tales	Story	While in Africa, Kane comes across an entire village wiped out, with all of the roofs having been ripped off, as if by some creature attempting to get inside from above.
"Blades of the Brotherhood"/"The Blue Flame of Vengeance"	1968	Red Shadows, Grant	Story	On the English coast, Kane battles the Fishhawk and his fellow pirates in a historical action tale with no fantasy elements. Writer John Pocsik was commissioned by Arkham House founder August Derleth to "edit" Howard's prose and to add a weird element for his 1964 anniversary anthology Over the Edge. REH scholar L. Sprague de Camp and author Fritz Leiber are both reported to have thought highly of the "new" version. Pocsik went on to pen several other Kane pastiches, only one of which, "The Fiend Within", saw print in Ariel (with "Solomon Kane" changed to "Jonathan Flint").
"The Right Hand of Doom"	1968	Red Shadows, Grant	Story	Kane plays a minimal role in this story. A condemned wizard, Roger Simeon, seeks revenge on John Redly, the man who betrayed him.
"The One Black Stain"	-	-	Poem	Wherein Solomon Kane speaks out against Sir Francis Drake, objecting to his execution of Sir Thomas Doughty in 1578 Patagonia, South America (actual historical people and events).
"The Return of Sir Richard Grenville"	-	-	Poem	Kane fights side-by-side with the ghost of Sir Richard Grenville, at whose 1591 death Kane had been present.
"Solomon Kane's Homecoming"	1936, Fall (republished in 1976)	Fanciful Tales of Time and Space	Poem	After years of wandering, Kane comes back to England "to live forever in my place." Then he hears "the howling of the ocean pack" and leaves again. This work contains a dialog exchange between Kane and a local man: "Where is Bess? Woe that I caused her tears."/"In the quiet churchyard by the sea she has slept these seven years." Most fans of the character have assumed that Bess is Queen Elizabeth I of England and consequently date the incident to 1610 but this is wrong. In the Howard fragment, "Hawk of Basti," Kane says of this monarch, "She herself has lied to and betrayed the folk of my faith...," an historian described Elizabeth as "a huge boulder in the path of Puritanism, unavoidable, insurmountable, immovable," and she is buried in Westminster Abbey which does not fit the description of Bess' burial place. Some fans consider "Bess" to be the love interest of Solomon Kane. There is no other mention of Bess in the stories, but given the character of Kane, a story has been read between the lines: Bess and Kane have shared a love, but the wayfaring nature of Kane has forced him to pursue his adventures. Perhaps he has planned to come home to start a family with Bess, but upon hearing of her death, breaks all connections to home and leaves again without returning.
"Death's Black Riders"	1968, Spring	The Howard Collector #10	Fragment	Just a few lines completed. Kane meets a shadowy ghost rider on the road.
"The Castle of the Devil"	1968	Red Shadows, Grant	Fragment	In the Black Forest, Kane tells John Silent, an English mercenary, how he cut down a boy from the local Baron's gibbet. Both men head to the Baron's castle for a reckoning. The final Howard sentence is the following: "Your speech is wild and Godless," said Kane. "But I begin to like you." (page 64 of Bantam edition, Skulls in the Stars)
"The Children of Asshur"	-	Red Shadows	Fragment	Kane comes across a lost city of Assyrians. Howard completed parts I through III (Part III ends on page 129 of Bantam edition, The Hills of the Dead)
"Hawk of Basti"	-	Red Shadows	Fragment	Kane's old acquaintance, Jeremy Hawk, was once the king of an African lost civilization, and wants to resume that role. The final Howard sentence is the following: Then calling to a man who had the appearance of a chief, he ordered him to walk between himself and Kane. (page 33 of Bantam edition, The Hills of the Dead)
Notes
Ramsey Campbell has completed Howard's three sizable fragments in English, and several compilations contain some of these collaborations. The 1978 and 1979 Bantam editions and 1996 Baen edition (ISBN 0-671-87695-3) in which Campbell's continuation and completion of Howard's fragments are printed do not delineate the exact spot at which the author changes. Comparing these to the 2004 Ballantine edition, The Savage Tales of Solomon Kane, gives us that information.; Javier Martin Lalanda has completed Howard's fragments in Las Aventuras De Solomon Kane, the complete Spanish edition of the Kane stories.; Gianluigi Zuddas has completed Howard's fragments in Solomon Kane, Fanucci, Rome, 1979, the complete Italian edition of the Kane stories.

== Adaptations ==
=== Audio ===
There are currently three audio-book recordings of Solomon Kane stories and poems, all currently available for purchase and download through Audible. There is one free audio drama production:

- The Savage Tales of Solomon Kane, an unabridged audio-book of the collected Solomon Kane stories released by Tantor Audio and narrated by Paul Boehmer, originally available on CD (ISBN 1400142288).
- A 2019 unabridged recording in French released by Hardigan Audio and read by Nicolas Planchais.
- A 2013 recording of the poem "Solomon Kane's Homecoming", released by Spoken Realms Audio and read by Glenn Hascall.

=== Film ===
A film adaptation was produced by Davis-Films with M. J. Bassett writing and directing. The film was produced by Samuel Hadida, Paul Berrow, and Kevan Van Thompson. Shooting started in Czech Republic in January 2008, with James Purefoy (Rome's Mark Antony) as Kane. Max von Sydow plays Kane's father, and Pete Postlethwaite, Alice Krige and Jason Flemyng are among the supporting cast. Patrick Tatopoulos, creature designer for Godzilla, Underworld, Silent Hill, I Am Legend and others, conceptualized the monsters Kane fights in his battles with the forces of evil. The film was released in France on December 23, 2009, in the UK on February 19, 2010 and in the US on September 28, 2012.

=== Comics ===
- Marvel Comics published several comic books featuring Solomon Kane in the 1970s and 1980s.
- It was announced at the 2006 Comic Con that Paradox Entertainment has completed a publishing deal with Dark Horse Comics for a Solomon Kane comic series, to be written by Scott Allie, drawn by Mario Guevara, and colored by Dave Stewart. As of 2012, three mini-series were published: Solomon Kane, Solomon Kane: Death's Black Riders, and Solomon Kane: Red Shadows.
- Andrew Cain, a fictional 19th century monster hunter in the Italian comic book Zagor was inspired by Kane.
  - Chronologically, Andrew Cain appears:
    - in editions of Zagor published by Slobodna Dalmacija: 50 Morska strava, 51, Witch hunter, 52 Kraken.
    - in editions of Zagor published by Ludens: 103 Cain's Return, 104 Atlantis, 105 The Hidden Fortress.
- Titan Comics is publishing Solomon Kane mini-series written and drawn by Patrick Zircher:
  - Solomon Kane: The Serpent Ring (2025)
  - Solomon Kane: The Lion Errant (2026)

=== Role-playing game ===
Pinnacle Entertainment Group has published a role-playing game based on the character utilizing the Savage Worlds rules system, titled The Savage World of Solomon Kane. In addition to game rules, the book features a background and summaries of Howard's original stories and an original adventure campaign featuring a group of wanderers following the path of Kane and revisiting places changed by Solomon's actions. Pinnacle Entertainment Group also published several companion campaign books that expand on the Solomon Kane universe. The total roster of books include:

- The Savage World of Solomon Kane (Savage Worlds, S2P10400) October 29, 2007. (ISBN 978-0979245589)
- Travelers' Tales (Solomon Kane Adventure, S2P10401) August 18, 2008. (ISBN 978-0981528168)
- The Savage Foes of Solomon Kane (Savage Worlds, S2P10402) May 17, 2010. (ISBN 978-0982642702)
- The Path of Kane (Solomon Kane, Savage Worlds, S2P10403) November 14, 2011. (Out of Print—Limited Availability) (ISBN 978-0982817582)

=== Board game ===
Mythic Games has developed a narrative adventure board game simply titled Solomon Kane based on Robert E. Howard's original stories and characters. The game was funded via the crowdfunding platform Kickstarter in July 2018 and has been in development since, with initial release slated for summer 2020.

The game is a co-op style board game where players represent the virtues that drive Solomon Kane forwards in his quest against darkness. Kane's various adventures are told in the game through one or more acts, which break down into smaller chapters of gameplay. These are scenarios with multiple possible outcomes and branching story arcs, where the players also have a chance of diverging from the original stories of Robert E. Howard and instead explore a number of "what if" scenarios written by Mythic Games.

=== Sculptures, toys, and miniatures ===
Fernando Ruiz Miniatures (FerMiniatures) sells a sculpted miniature of Solomon Kane that can be painted and displayed or used in a role-playing game. This miniature presents Kane in puritan attire, equipped with a rapier sword, a dagger, pistols and the mythical Staff of Solomon, given to him by the shaman N’Longa.

Mezco Toyz has created a Solomon Kane action figure for its One:12 Collective product line. This 17 cm action figure is outfitted in a nobleman’s shirt and vest, duster coat, adventurer pants, and Viking boots. His utility belt and removable chest harness can hold his various weapon sheaths. It also features interchangeable hair, interchangeable facial expressions, the Staff of Solomon, multiple daggers and sheaths, a flintlock pistol, and a dirk sword.

The Figures Toy Company created a toy action figure for Solomon Kane in 2014. This 8 inch figure includes a hat, sword and flintlock pistol.

Randy Bowen Designs created a cold cast bronze sculpture of Solomon Kane in 1998. It is based on the image from Robert E. Howard's "The Savage Tales of Solomon Kane". The statue 1/9th scale is fully painted. The sculpture comes with interchangeable hands, either holding a sword or the Staff of Solomon stick. It comes on a black display base and is numbered from a limited edition run of 550.

== Copyright and trademark ==
Trademark on the name Solomon Kane and the names of Robert E. Howard's other principal characters are claimed by Paradox Entertainment of Stockholm, Sweden, through its US subsidiary Paradox Entertainment Inc. Paradox also claims copyrights on the stories written by other authors under license from Solomon Kane Inc. Since Robert E. Howard published his Solomon Kane stories at a time when the date of publication was the marker, the owners had to use the copyright symbol, and they had to renew after a certain time to maintain copyright, the exact status of many of Howard's Solomon Kane works are in question. However, as the first three stories were published before 1930, they are unambiguously in the public domain in the United States.

Project Gutenberg, for example, holds only some of Robert E. Howard's stories while Project Gutenberg Australia has a more complete selection, implying that the stories are unambiguously free from copyright under Australian law, which only lasts 50 years after the author's death, while the possibility of copyright renewal disbars many from Project Gutenberg's inclusion criteria in the United States.

Subsequent stories written by other authors are subject to the copyright laws of the relevant time.

== Solomon Kane stories by other authors ==
=== Tales of the Shadowmen ===
Tales of the Shadowmen is an anthology series edited by Jean-Marc Lofficier and Randy Lofficier, where characters from French and international speculative fiction exist in the same universe. Tales of the Shadowmen, Volume 3: Danse Macabre includes a story entitled "The Heart of the Moon" by Matthew Baugh which features Solomon Kane as one of a group of adventurers visiting Féval's vampire metropolis, Selene. Tales of the Shadowmen, Volume 4: Lords of Terror includes a story entitled "The Anti-Pope of Avignon" by Micah Harris featuring Solomon Kane as the central protagonist supporting the Huguenot cause in Avignon.

=== The Wold Newton Family ===
In Philip José Farmer's Doc Savage: His Apocalyptic Life, Farmer identifies Solomon Kane as being a direct ancestor of adventurer Doc Savage. This book is part of a larger literary conceit that the (real) meteorite which fell in Wold Newton, Yorkshire, England, on December 13, 1795, was radioactive and caused genetic mutations in the occupants of a passing coach. As luck would have it many of these occupants were also already of heroic stock. See the Savage Family Tree.

=== Observable Things ===
Paul Di Filippo's "Observable Things", as narrated by a young Cotton Mather, tells of Solomon Kane coming to the aid of the colonists in New England during King Philip's War.

== Book editions ==
Howard's stories, poems, and fragments featuring Solomon Kane have been published several times as a collection in book form. Not every publication has been a complete collection.

- Red Shadows, Donald M. Grant, 1968 (all but Death's Black Riders, assembled by the Howard estate's literary agent, Glenn Lord, in what he considered internal chronological order.
- Rattle of Bones & Other Terrifying Tales, Clover Press, LLC, October 2020. (ISBN 978-1951038298)
- The Solomon Kane Omnibus, Benediction Classics, Oxford, 2010. (ISBN 978-1849027328)
- Three-volume set, all but Death's Black Riders:
  - The Moon of Skulls, Centaur Press, November 1969.
  - The Hand of Kane, Centaur Press, October 1970.
  - Solomon Kane, Centaur Press, February 1971.
- Two-volume set, all but Death's Black Riders, with introductory essays by Ramsey Campbell, who also completed the three sizable fragments for this collection:
  - Solomon Kane: Skulls in the Stars, Bantam Books, December 1978.
  - Solomon Kane: The Hills of the Dead, Bantam Books, March 1979.
- Solomon Kane, Baen Books, November 1995. (ISBN 0-671-87695-3) (This edition contains the same texts & Ramsey Campbell material as the Bantam set.)
- The Savage Tales of Solomon Kane, Wandering Star, November 1998. (British edition)
- The Savage Tales of Solomon Kane (2004) Howard, Robert E.; Illus. Gianni, Gary. New York: Ballantine Books. ISBN 0-345-46150-9. (North American edition)
- The Right Hand of Doom & Other Tales of Solomon Kane, Wordsworth Editions, 2007. (ISBN 978-1-84022-611-9)
- Las Aventuras de Solomón Kane, Ultima Thule, Ed. Anaya, Spain, November 1994. (A complete collection of stories, poems, and fragments featuring Solomon Kane, in Spanish translation.)
- Ten (?) volume set from Wildside Press, the publisher of Weird Tales, as a complete collection of Howard's entire Weird Tales catalog.
  - Shadow Kingdoms: The Weird Works of Robert E. Howard Volume One, Wildside Press, 2004. (ISBN 0-8095-6236-7)
  - Moon of Skulls: The Weird Works of Robert E. Howard Volume Two, Wildside Press, 2006. (ISBN 978-0-8095-1084-9)
  - People of the Dark: The Weird Works of Robert E. Howard Volume Three, 2006.(ISBN 978-0-8095-5680-9)
  - Wings in the Night: The Weird Works of Robert E. Howard Volume Four, 2006. (ISBN 978-0-8095-1134-1)
  - Valley of the Worm: The Weird Works of Robert E. Howard Volume Five, 2006. (ISBN 978-0-8095-1135-8)
  - The Garden of Fear: The Weird Works of Robert E. Howard Volume Six, 2006. (ISBN 978-0-8095-1136-5)
  - Beyond the Black River: The Weird Works of Robert E. Howard Volume Seven, 2007. (ISBN 978-0-8095-1137-2)
  - Hours of the Dragon: The Weird Works of Robert E. Howard Volume Eight, 2008. (ISBN 978-0-8095-7151-2)
  - Black Hounds of Death: The Weird Works Of Robert E. Howard Volume Nine, 2008. (ISBN 978-0-8095-7154-3)
  - A Thunder of Trumpets: The Weird Works of Robert E. Howard, Volume Ten, 2010. (ISBN 978-0-8095-7170-3)
