= Bullets & Lipstik =

Bullets & Lipstik may refer to:

- Bullets & Lipstik (album), an album by Pretty Boy Floyd
- Bullets & Lipstik (EP), an EP by Pretty Boy Floyd
