= Vicky Hamilton =

American record executive

- Born: Vicky Hamilton; April 1, 1958 (age 68); Charleston, West Virginia
- Years active: 1978–present
- Website: www.vickyhamilton.com

Vicky Hamilton (born April 1, 1958) is an American record executive, personal manager, promoter and club booker, journalist, playwright, screenwriter, documentary filmmaker, and artist.

She is noted for managing the early careers of Guns N' Roses, Poison and Faster Pussycat, as well as working as a management consultant for Mötley Crüe and Stryper, and credited for developing their careers.

== Early life ==
Hamilton was born in Charleston, West Virginia, to Woodrow Arthur Hamilton and Clara Virginia Hamilton. She was the youngest of three girls. Her sisters are Sharon Lee Hamilton and Brenda Ann Hamilton.

Hamilton's father was a coal miner, a sailor and then an engineer for BF Goodrich. While she was in the 5th grade, her father was transferred to Fort Wayne, Indiana. She graduated from New Haven High School, New Haven, Indiana in 1976, and attended Fort Wayne Art Institute before dropping out to work in the music industry.

=== 1980s ===
Hamilton booked and promoted many glam and metal bands throughout the 1980s. Her first music industry job was as a record store clerk in Indiana. While working at the record store, she became a concert review writer for the Three Rivers Review and a concert booker for Summer in the city, all in Fort Wayne. An art school dropout, Hamilton began to manage bands in 1979. Dynasty, Ebenezer, and Destin were the first acts she managed. While interviewing Tom Petty for Three Rivers Review, Petty told Hamilton she was a California girl. That convinced her to move to Los Angeles, California in 1981.

After a short run as a cocktail waitress at the Palomino Club, and then Gazzarri's, she was hired by Gary Gersh to work as a record store clerk at Licorice Pizza record store. The store was across the street from the famous Whisky a Go Go club. While at Licorice Pizza, she met Nikki Sixx of Mötley Crüe, and began helping the band; soon after, she was hired as a management consultant by then manager Allan Coffman. Hamilton did display merchandising all over Los Angeles for the Greenworld-distributed "Too Fast For Love" record, and helped promote Mötley Crüe to the record labels. Once they were signed to Elektra Records, however, the band got new management, and Hamilton was out of a job.

She then became a management consultant for Christian rock band Stryper, but parted with the band over "spiritual differences." She then started managing Poison soon after they moved to LA, while continuing to promote concerts at The Roxy Theatre and Whisky a Go Go. After a falling out with Poison once they signed with Enigma Records, she began managing Guns N' Roses and Darling Cruel.

==== Guns N' Roses ====
Early in 1984, Vicky got a call from Axl Rose while she was working as an agent for rock acts at Silverlining Entertainment. Rose said he wanted to bring her a demo of his band, Hollywood Rose, but she asked him to mail it to her, as she did not have a way to play it in her office. Rose responded, "I have a ghetto blaster. I'll bring it and play it for you." One hour later, Rose and Izzy Stradlin played Hamilton the demo, and Hamilton booked the band, sight unseen.

Hamilton was also booking Slash's band, Black Sheep, and she introduced Slash to Axl when Hollywood Rose opened for Black Sheep and Stryper at the Music Machine, in West LA. Shortly after Chris Weber (guitarist of Hollywood Rose) departed for New York City, Slash became the Hollywood Rose's guitarist, joined by Steven Adler on drums and Duff McKagan on bass. This formed the original lineup of Guns N' Roses. Hamilton took on a management role as the band moved into a rehearsal space near Howie Hubberman's guitar shop, Guitars R Us.

Slash convinced Vicky to let Axl hide out at her apartment until his legal troubles with the police blew over. Over the next six months, nearly all of the band (with the exception of McKagan, who lived with his girlfriend) moved into Hamilton's one-bedroom apartment at 1114 North Clark St. in West Hollywood. Jennifer Perry was Hamilton's roommate.

Hamilton booked many live shows for the band, got them a lawyer and took many meeting with major record companies. Vicky convinced Howie Hubberman to invest $25,000 in gear, clothes and rehearsals for the band. As a result of her efforts and the band's talent, a major bidding war ensued among labels to sign the band, and on March 26. 1986, Guns N' Roses signed a deal with Geffen Records. However, Guns N' Roses had not repaid the loan to Hubberman, and he sued; the matter was settled out of court.

Hamilton took an A&R consulting job at Geffen Records soon after agreeing to let the label find the band major management. She went on to manage Darling Cruel, Faster Pussycat, The Lostboys, and Salty Dog, securing them all major record deals. Hamilton later took a full-time A&R job at Geffen Records, and brought in deals for Salty Dog, Rick Parker, Half Way Home, I, Napoleon, and The Graveyard Train. Hamilton worked at Geffen Records from 1988 to 1992.

In an interview with Legendary Rock Interviews, Steven Adler was asked,

- LRI "What did Vicky Hamilton do to really set the table for Guns N' Roses?"
- Steven Adler "What didn't she do? (laughs). I love Vicky Hamilton. There are probably four or five people--tops--that I will be mentioning by name at the Hall of Fame, and they are certainly among the people who truly deserve to be thanked. I love Vicky and Marc so much because they truly, truly believed in our band and put their own asses on the line for us. The Vicky thing was devastating to me personally. It was just like this reunion bullshit with Axl in that I had no say in it whatsoever. I didn't want to see Vicky leave as our manager, not at ALL, but a couple, a couple of the other guys did. They were concerned and saying, 'Well, she's a woman, and people are thinking she's not doing as good of a job as a man could do.' I did not feel that way, and I was very hurt when we could not take her with us as our career went forward."
- LRI: "Were you there when Kim Fowley was with Axl and the others and was suggesting that Vicky was too "pretty" to be a manager?"
- Steven: "Yes I was, and while Kim Fowley might not have been that big of an influence personally on Axl, he was an influence as far as what he had accomplished in the business. Axl agreed with Kim, and I didn’t. I knew that she was great and she still is. It was beyond ridiculous to say that a woman couldn’t have impact on our careers, because as I knew full well that Teresa Ensenat and Vicky Hamilton were every bit as important as Tom Zutaut to our success. Axl was all worried about having women involved in our careers when two of the three main people involved in us making it were women! It made no f****ing sense to me that he couldn’t see that while some women were crazy as f**k, some of them are freakin geniuses. Vicky Hamilton is not only crafty, but smart as a whip, and knew better than anyone how to guide our career."

=== Rock and Roll Hall of Fame ===
On April 14, 2012, Guns N' Roses was inducted into the Rock and Roll Hall of Fame Steven Adler thanked Vicky for what she meant to him and the band. Slash thanked Hamilton saying "Vicky tried to manage us with all her heart and soul."

==== The 1990s ====
Hamilton continued to manage many bands and artists. Working at Lookout Management/Vapor Records where she managed American recording artist The Freewheelers and TVT Recording artist, Portable. She also took an interest in painters and developed a relationship with lowbrow artist Ron English, representing him for special projects and album jackets. She also represented graffiti artist Street Phantom, whom she bailed out of jail. He went on to do the album jackets for Rage Against the Machine, and The Battle of Los Angeles. While managing The Freewheelers, who were label mates with Johnny Cash, they were invited to open for the man in black at the House of Blues. Backstage after the show in 1996, Hamilton told label president Rick Rubin and artist Tom Petty how much she enjoyed Johnny's performance and particularly Johnny's sidekick and wife, June Carter Cash. Rubin suggested Hamilton make a record with June, and this started a friendship between Carter-Cash and Hamilton. Vicky shopped the idea of making a record with June to many major labels and was shocked that no one wanted to do it. This led Hamilton to start her own label, Small Hairy Dog, in 1999. Small Hairy Dog joint ventured with Risk Records to produce Press On. In 2000 the album won a Grammy for best traditional folk record. In addition to starting her own label, Hamilton followed her friend Gary Gersh to Capitol Records as an A&R consultant, where she worked until 1999. Hamilton started her own management company, Aesthetic V in 2001. She manages, consults and represents several musical acts and visual artists.

== 1990s ==
From 1988 to 1992 she worked in A&R at Geffen Records, as well as Lookout Management. She was with Vapor Records from 1994 to 1996, and as an A&R consultant at Capitol Records from 1997 to 1999. She started her own record label, Small Hairy Dog, in 1997, a joint venture with Risk Records in 1998. The only artist signed to the label was June Carter Cash whose album Press On won a Grammy Award for Best Traditional Folk Album in 2000.

== Later work ==
Hamilton booked acts for Bar Sinister in Hollywood from 2001 to 2010, and profiled A&R people for the A&R Registry from 2005 to 2010. She also taught at the Musician's Institute from 2007 to 2009.

Hamilton has co-written two screenplays and a musical play. The musical play, Glitter Beach (co-written with Robbie Quine, who is writing the music) has been picked up by director Daniel Henning, who is overseeing the rewrites. It was slated to be ready for production in 2014. Hamilton is also making a documentary about the music business called "Until The Music Ends" with partner Bill Watson (Midnight Train Media). The film was set to debut in 2014. Hamilton is also working on an autobiography as well as working on Until The Music Ends, and starting a Vblog that is called Aesthetic V.

== TV and video appearances ==
- Vicky was interviewed on Axl Rose the Prettiest Star DVD UK release
- Two Metal Head video magazines Volume one and two

Biography Channel:

- Guns N' Roses
- Bret Michaels

VH1:

- Driven, Mötley Crüe
- Behind the Music, Guns N' Roses
- Do it for the Band, Women of the Sunset Strip
- When Metal Ruled The World
- Grunge and Glam
- Popaganda-The Art and Crimes of Ron English
- Hollywood Rocks! The Ultimate Documentary

BBC:

- Born To Be Wild /the Golden age of Rock in America Welcome to the Jungle.

== Book references ==
- My Appetite for Destruction Steven Adler
- The Band That Time Forgot by Paul Stenning, 2004
- Watch You Bleed: The Saga of Guns N' Roses by Stephen Davis
- Slash by Slash with Anthony Bozza
- Record Store Days by Gary Calamar and Phil Gallo
- Hollywood Rocks by Cleopatra
- Johnny Cash The Life by Robert Hilburn
- Louder Than Hell by Jon Wiederhorn and Katherine Turman
