= Leather Boyz with Electric Toyz =

Studio album by Pretty Boy Floyd
- Released: October 5, 1989
- Studios: Kajem/Victory, Philadelphia, Pennsylvania, U.S.
- Genre: Glam metal
- Label: MCA
- Producer: Howard Benson

Pretty Boy Floyd chronology
Leather Boyz with Electric Toyz (1989)	A Tale of Sex, Designer Drugs, and the Death of Rock n' Roll (1998)

Singles from Leather Boyz with Electric Toyz
- 1. "Rock and Roll (Is Gonna Set the Night on Fire)" / "Toast of the Town" Released: 1989; 2. "I Wanna Be with You" / "Rock and Roll Outlaws" Released: 1989

Professional ratings
Review scores
Source	Rating
AllMusic	3/5 stars

Leather Boyz with Electric Toyz is the debut album by the American band Pretty Boy Floyd. It reached No. 130 on the United States Billboard chart in 1989. It was released on MCA Records and was produced by Howard Benson.

The band produced videos for the songs "Rock and Roll (Is Gonna Set the Night on Fire)" and "I Wanna Be with You”.

== Track listing ==
1. Leather Boyz with Electric Toyz - 4:48
2. Rock and Roll (Is Gonna Set the Night on Fire) - 3:13
3. Wild Angels - 5:08
4. 48 Hours - 2:59
5. Toast of the Town* - 3:18
6. Rock and Roll Outlaws - 2:33
7. Only the Young - 3:51
8. The Last Kiss - 2:39
9. Your Mama Won't Know - 3:42
10. I Wanna Be with You - 3:57
11. Slam Dunk - 2:57 (Kevin DuBrow, Harry Perris) (released for the 1991 movie Switch and issued as a Japanese bonus track)
- *This is a cover of a Mötley Crüe song that appeared as the b-side to their debut single, "Stick to Your Guns", released on their Leathür Records label in 1981.

Original guitarist Aeriel Stiles wrote 8 of the 11 songs on Leather Boyz with Electric Toyz, with the exception of "Rock and Roll (Is Gonna Set the Night on Fire)" (Kristy Majors), the Mötley Crüe cover "Toast of the Town", and "Slam Dunk". He played guitar on "Slam Dunk", after rejoining the band in early 1991.

== Bonus ==
The 2003 bonus re-issue featured some extra tracks, a couple of which had been recorded as part of Kristy Majors solo project.

1. Slam Dunk (Kevin DuBrow, Harry Perris)
2. She's My Baby (Majors, Summers)
3. Two Hearts (Majors, Summers)
4. Over the Edge (Majors)
5. I Just Wanna Have Something to Do (Ramones cover)

== Limited Edition ==
A very limited-release 2011 re-issue featured a cover of Department of Youth, by Alice Cooper, originally released on Welcome to my Nightmare in 1975.

== Personnel ==
Pretty Boy Floyd

- Steve "Sex" Summers – lead vocals
- Kristy "Krash" Majors – guitars, backing vocals
- Vinnie Chas – bass, backing vocals
- Kari Kane – drums, backing vocals

Additional musicians

- Aeriel Stiles - guitar on track 11
- Howard Benson – keyboards
- Matt Bradley – vocals
- Phil Balvano – vocals
- Jennifer "Miss Frosty" Hoopes, Paris Hampton, Maura Eagan, Candice Gartland, Elizabeth Goldner, Katharine Lundy – backing vocals

Production

- Produced By Howard Benson
- Recorded, Engineered & Mixed By Howard Benson & Bill Jackson
- Assistant Engineers: Brian Stover, Brooke Hendricks, George Schureman, Jeff Chestek, Mike Cohn
- Glen LaFerman – photography
- Paula Janecek – artwork, design, layout design
