= Harris (band) =

American rock band

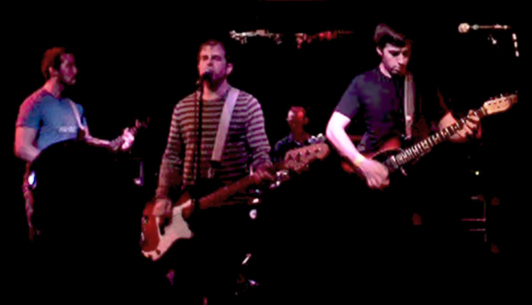
- Harris performing "No Place Like Space" at the Middle East Upstairs in Cambridge, Massachusetts in February 2009. L–R: Matt Scott, Mike Nastri, Rob Lynch, Jon Day.

Background information
- Origin: Lowell, Massachusetts
- Genres: Rock
- Years active: 2000–2009
- Past members: Rob Blatt; Jon Day; Rob Lynch; Mike Nastri; Jim Reed; Matt Scott; Mike Seluk; Andrew Sutherland
- Website: harriscore.com

Harris was an American rock band formed in Lowell, Massachusetts in 2000. The group independently released one studio album, The Light Is Seeping Through the Cracks, along with numerous EPs, before disbanding in April 2009.

== History ==
Harris was formed by vocalist/bassist Mike Nastri and guitarist Matt Scott in 2000 while they attended UMass Lowell. After releasing several EPs, Harris independently recorded, produced, and released their only full-length album, The Light Is Seeping Through the Cracks, in 2005. The album's release was followed by a self-booked tour of the United States and Canada, which was met with mixed reviews. Harris toured Europe in the summer of 2008, and amicably disbanded in April 2009 due to the members' increasing family and career obligations. Their final recording, Snake Says Woof, was released on April 18, 2009 at their last show, which took place at the Middle East Downstairs nightclub in Cambridge, Massachusetts.

== Music ==
Harris's music was rooted in rock but was made up of diverse styles, with influences such as The Police. The Boston Herald described the band's music as a dynamic mix of "smooth sounds and harsher, heavier clashes". "We try to mix as many genres as we possibly can and try to come out with a coherent, original sound," drummer Rob Lynch described. Harris had a shared writing process among its five members, who would switch instruments in order to share ideas. Harris frequently played in the Boston area, and was described by Northeast Performer as a "comforting presence in local rock."

== Members ==
- Rob Blatt – drums (2000–2002)
- Jon Day – guitar (2002–2009)
- Rob Lynch – drums, percussion (2002–2009)
- Mike Nastri – vocals, bass (2000–2009)
- Jim Reed – keyboard, vocals (2003–2009)
- Matt Scott – guitar (2000–2009)
- Mike Seluk – guitar (2000–2002)
- Andrew Sutherland – keyboard (2000–2003)

== Discography ==
=== Studio albums ===
- The First Few Year (2001)
- New Morning Pulse (2003)
- The Light Is Seeping Through the Cracks (2005)
- Tales from the Split, Vol. 1 (2007 - DV's records) (Split LP with the French band Spudgun)
- Snake Says Woof (2009 - DV's records)

=== EPs ===
- The Early Year (2000)
- Live: Long Beach Arena, March 7, 1987 (2001)
- The Hottastic Sessions (2002)
- New Morning Pulse (Urinine, 2003)
