= Size Really Does Matter =

Studio album by Pretty Boy Floyd
- Released: 2004
- Recorded: Synical Teknologies; North Hollywood, CA.
- Genre: Glam metal
- Length: 38:08
- Label: Deadline Records
- Producer: Lesli Sanders; Brian Haught

Pretty Boy Floyd chronology
Live at the Pretty Ugly Club (2001)	Size Really Does Matter (2004)

Alternative cover
- TB Records Version (2004)

Professional ratings
Review scores
Source	Rating
Allmusic	4/5 stars

Size Really Does Matter is the third album of the American band Pretty Boy Floyd. It is their first studio record not to feature guitarist Kristy "Krash" Majors and drummer Kari Kane.

Although the album was not commercially successful, it received positive reviews from music critics such as Allmusic.

Notably the album features no songs written by former guitarist Ariel Stiles or Kristy Majors. Stiles has been quoted as saying that he "was very happy to see Steve create some new music with new people"

The song Dead is a cover of Lesli's old band, The Distractions.

727 is written for drummer Dish's sister who died in a car accident on 27 July 2002. This was written by Lesli Sanders

The album was co-produced by bassist, Lesli Sanders and Brian Haught.

== Track listing ==
All songs written by Lesli Sanders, Steve Summers, Tchad Drats, Dish

1. Dead
2. Suicide
3. I've Got Nothing
4. Earth Girls
5. Things I've Said
6. Another Day (In The Death Of America)
7. 2Heads2Faces
8. Fuck The Rock
9. 727
10. It's Alright

== Band ==
- Steve "Sex" Summers - vocals
- T'Chad - guitars
- Lesli Sanders - bass
- Dish - drums

== Credits ==
- Brian Haught - producer, engineer, mixing
- Lesli Sanders - producer, concept, artwork
- Dan Kincaid - engineer
