= Airbourne =

Airbourne or Air Bourne may refer to:

- Airbourne (band), an Australian hard rock band
  - Airbourne (album) their self-titled album (2026)
- Airbourne or Eastbourne Airbourne, an air show in Eastbourne, United Kingdom
- Air Bourne, a finishing move and the former nickname of professional wrestler Matt Sydal, who performed as Evan Bourne

== See also ==
- Airborne (disambiguation)
