= Urinine Records =

American independent record label

URININE Records was an independent record label started by Sid Sowder in Indianapolis in 1994. The record label shared its name with his zine. In the years that followed, the record label would move with Sowder to Kansas City and ultimately to Boston. He folded the label on July 4, 2004 citing the increased commercialization of the indie music scene.

== Tribute albums ==
URININE released a series of tribute albums to bands unpopular in the indie rock scene at the time. The first was a tribute to Creedence Clearwater Revival that included "Lodi" as performed by Pound WI, "Lookin' Out My Back Door" performed by Squidboy, "Who'll Stop the Rain" performed by Ruined in a Day, and "Fortunate Son" performed by Sohcahtoa. The Ruined in a Day cover was particularly curious as the band never actually sung the song's namesake chorus. In 2000 URININE released "The Wrong Way Home: A Tribute to Supertramp" which included Panoply Academy Corps of Engineers performing a medley of "Dreamer" and "Crime of the Century," Free Range Pilgrim performing "Breakfast in America," Not Funny Anymore performing "Bloody Well Right," and Hell on Wheels performing "The Logical Song." The latter became a surprise hit in the band's native Sweden, despite the fact that the band had never heard the song before being presented the original by Sowder. In 2001 "Sweet 16s Turned 31: a Tribute to Bob Seger" was released featuring [DARYL] performing "Mainstreet," The Hillary Step performing "Against the Wind," Saraswati performing "Feel Like a Number" and Sweep the Leg Johnny performing "Night Moves." Although Sweep The Leg Johnny was known for its math rock style, the band's cover was understated and quiet, allowing vocalist Steve Sostak to sing rather than perform in his usual yelping style. The final tribute album was entitled "No Escape: A Tribute to Journey" and included The Ohms performing "Anytime," Houston performing "Send Her My Love," wafflehouse performing "Separate Ways (Worlds Apart)," and Traindodge performing "Only the Young." "Anytime" was originally to be performed by Shiner however during the mix down, frontman Allan Epley decided to scrap what had been recorded and instead re-record the song himself using only drummer Jason Gerken's drum tracks. Epley chose the name The Ohms for this one-off project.

== Complete listing of releases ==
- URN 7-001 Sohcahtoa 7-inch
- URN 7-003 Teevie/Pooteye split 7-inch
- URN 7-007 In Ano/Sohcahtoa split 7-inch
- URN CD-001 various artists "The 144 Minute CD"
- URN CD-002 The Sunflower Conspiracy/Airiel Project One "theresalwaysanendingbeforeabeginning" split CD-EP
- URN CD-003 various artists "Throwing Nickels: a CCR Tribute"
- URN CD-004 21 Union Square CD-EP
- URN CD-005 Free Range Pilgrim "Tracing Paper" CD-EP
- URN CD-006/Fact 1 Airplane Lady "1" CD
- URN CD-007 Pound WI/Sohcahtoa split CD-EP
- URN CD-008 Hell on Wheels "Alphaphozz & the Betahustle" CD-EP
- URN CD-009 The Believe It Or Nots "There's a Great Future in Plastics" CD-EP
- URN CD-010 various artists "The Wrong Way Home: A Tribute to Supertramp" CD-EP
- URN CD-011 The Hillary Step "The Second Time Means Nothing" CD
- URN CD-012 Park Ave. "When Jamie Went to London... We Broke Up" CD
- URN CD-013 [DARYL] "Communication:Duration" CD-EP
- URN CD-014 various artists "Sweet 16s Turned 31: a Tribute to Bob Seger" CD-EP
- URN CD-015 The Capsules "Reverser" CD
- URN CD-016 Namelessnumberheadmen "When We Leave, We Will Know Where We've Been" CD
- URN CD-017 various artists "No Escape: A Tribute to Journey" CD-EP
- URN CD-018 Hospital Grade "Written Axe to Trigger" CD
- URN CD-019 Harris "New Morning Pulse" CD-EP
- URN CD-020 The Capsules "Someone for Everyone" CD

== After URININE ==
In 2013 Sid Sowder began releasing music again as part of the "Too Much Rock Single Series." As of 2020 Too Much Rock has released 10 7-inch vinyl singles. "Too Much Rock Single Series".

== See also ==
- List of record labels
