= Maryland (automobile) =

Motor vehicle built by Sinclair-Scott in Maryland, United States (1907–1910)

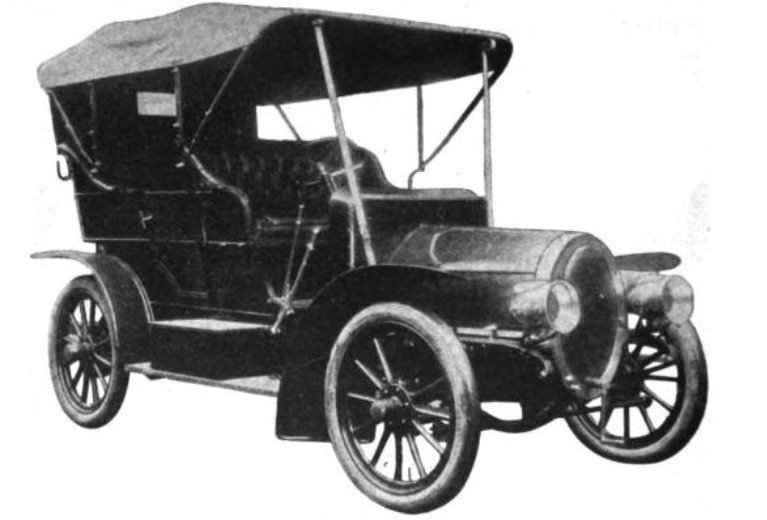
- 1906 Ariel; early Maryland touring cars were technically identical to this.

Overview
- Manufacturer: Sinclair-Scott Company
- Production: 1907–1910
- Assembly: Baltimore, Maryland

Body and chassis
- Body style: Roadster; Touring car; Limousine (from 1908); Town car (from 1909)
- Layout: Front-engine, rear-wheel drive
- Related: 1905-1907 Ariel

Powertrain
- Engine: Overhead camshaft inline-four engine

Dimensions
- Wheelbase: 2,794.0 mm (110 in) (early cars); 2,946.4 mm (116 in) (later cars)

The Maryland automobile was built by the Sinclair-Scott Company of Baltimore, Maryland, between 1907 and 1910.

== History ==
Sinclair-Scott was a maker of food canning machinery and in the early 1900s started to make car parts. One of their customers, Ariel, failed to pay and in recompense Sinclair-Scott took over production, moved the factory to Baltimore, and marketed the car as the Maryland.

The car was powered by a 30-hp four-cylinder, overhead camshaft engine. The Ariel design was initially unchanged, and the Maryland was originally available as a four-seat roadster or a five-seat touring car. The wheelbase was later lengthened from the initial 100 inches (2,500 mm) to 116 inches (2,900 mm). Limousines became available in 1908 and town cars in 1909. Prices ranged from $2,500 to $3,200, (equivalent to $87,491 in 2024).

Production stopped in 1910 after 871 Marylands had been made, as producing the cars was not profitable. The company returned to the manufacture of food-canning machinery.
