= Molten Young Lovers =

Studio album by Airiel
- Released: October 12, 2017
- Genre: Dream pop; shoegaze
- Length: 62:00
- Label: Shelflife

Airiel chronology
The Battle of Sealand (2007)	Molten Young Lovers (2017)

Professional ratings
Review scores
Source	Rating
AllMusic	3.5/5 stars
Primal Music	4/5 stars

Molten Young Lovers is the second studio album by American shoegaze band Airiel. It was released October 13, 2017 on Shelflife Records. It was the follow-up to their 2007 debut album, The Battle of Sealand, and the second release on their current label after the 2012 Kid Games EP. The album was issued in digital, CD (in Japan), and double vinyl formats.

In the decade since their previous album, the band's lineup changed considerably, and for this album, consisted of Jeremy Wrenn (guitars and vocals), Andrew Marrah (guitar), Spencer Kiss (drums) and Matt Blanton (bass).

== Track listing ==
Molten Young Lovers track listing
No.	Title	Length
1.	"This Is Permanent"	5:36
2.	"Cloudburst"	4:57
3.	"Your Lips, My Mouth"	4:50
4.	"Molten Young Lovers"	4:39
5.	"Mind Furnace"	2:31
6.	"Sharron Apple"	5:22
7.	"Song of You"	4:50
8.	"Inside Out"	6:31
9.	"Keep You"	6:10
10.	"Red Car"	4:35
11.	"You Sweet Talker"	4:24
12.	"The Painkillers"	5:26
