= Airborne =

Airborne or Airborn may refer to:

== Arts and entertainment ==
=== Films ===
- Airborne (1962 film), an American drama film
- Airborne (1993 film), an American comedy–drama film
- Airborne, a 1998 action film starring Steve Guttenberg
- Airborne (2012 film), a British horror film

=== Gaming ===
- Airborne!, a 1985 computer game by Silicon Beach Software
- Asphalt 8: Airborne, a 2013 video game
- Medal of Honor: Airborne, a 2007 video game

=== Literature ===
- Airborn (novel), by Kenneth Oppel, 2004
- Airborn (Hijos del aire), a 1979 poetry collection by Octavio Paz with Charles Tomlinson

=== Music ===
- Airbourne (band), an Australian hard rock band, initially styled as Airborne
- Airborn (band), Italian power metal band
- Airborn, an alternate version of the Platinum album by Mike Oldfield released in North America in 1980
- Airborne (Curved Air album), 1976
- Airborne (Don Felder album), 1983
- Airborne (The Flying Burrito Brothers album), 1976
- Airborne, a 2012 album by Erik Wøllo
- "Airborne", a song by Amplifier from the 2004 album Amplifier
- "Airborne", a song by Cinerama from the 2002 album Torino
- "Airborne", a song by Jaga Jazzist from the 2001 album A Livingroom Hush

=== Other uses in arts and entertainment ===
- Airborne a G.I. Joe: A Real American Hero character
- "Airborne", a 2007 episode of House season 3

== Other uses ==
- Airborne (dietary supplement), an American brand
- Airborne forces, a type of military ground combat units
- Airborne (horse) (1943–1962), British Thoroughbred racehorse

== See also ==
- Airbourne (disambiguation)
- Airborne transmission, of an infectious disease
- Takeoff, the phase of flight when an aerial vehicle leaves the ground and becomes airborne
