= The Light Is Seeping Through the Cracks =

Studio album by Harris
- Released: September 2005
- Genre: Rock
- Length: 52:30
- Label: Harris
- Producer: Harris

The Light Is Seeping Through the Cracks is a studio album released by American rock band Harris in September 2005. The album was independently recorded, produced, and released by the band. The album's release was followed by a self-booked tour of the United States and Canada.

== Track list ==
All songs written and produced by Harris.

1. "Solid Ground" (2:39)
2. "Like Origami" (3:36)
3. "Last Sentiment" (3:02)
4. "Carousel" (3:27)
5. "New Color" (5:15)
6. "Some Kind of Gospel" (4:15)
7. "Worse Company" (5:15)
8. "Pace of Change" (4:54)
9. "Not What We Used to Be" (3:00)
10. "Too Young to Go" (5:34)
11. "Silent Treatment" (3:16)
12. "Captain" (8:17)

== Personnel ==
=== Harris ===
- Jon Day – guitar
- Rob Lynch – drums, percussion
- Mike Nastri – vocals, bass
- Jim Reed – keyboards, vocals
- Matthew Scott – guitar

=== Additional musicians ===
- Eli Cohn – strings (track 8)
- Bob Mallory – strings (track 8)
- Michael Matta – string arrangement (track 8)

=== Production ===
- Matt Azevedo – mastering
- Jon Day – engineering (tracks 1–7, 9–12)
- Rick Kwan – engineering (track 8)
- Dan McCarthy – artwork
