= Porn Stars (album) =

Studio album by Pretty Boy Floyd
- Released: 1999
- Genre: Hard rock, Glam metal
- Label: Cleopatra Records
- Producer: Pretty Boy Floyd

Pretty Boy Floyd chronology
A Tale of Sex, Designer Drugs, and the Death of Rock n' Roll (1998)	Porn Stars (1999)	Live at the Pretty Ugly Club (2001)

Professional ratings
Review scores
Source	Rating
Allmusic	3/5 stars

Porn Stars is a studio album by the band Pretty Boy Floyd. It features re-recordings of six tracks from their debut album Leather Boyz With Electric Toyz, a re-recording of one track from Tonight Belongs To The Young, and a re-recording of one track from their EP A Tale of Sex, Designer Drugs, and the Death of Rock N Roll. The production on this recording is notably far more raw than their debut.

The album features five new tracks with two being covers, "Shout It Out Loud" by KISS and "Department Of Youth" by Alice Cooper. Pretty Boy Floyd guitarist Keri Kelli later joined Alice Cooper's band.

== Track listing ==
1. "Good Girl Gone Bad" – 3:43
2. "Rock & Roll Outlaws" – 2:34
3. "Shy Diane" – 4:16
4. "Shout It Out Loud" (KISS cover) – 2:44
5. "Leather Boyz With Electric Toyz" – 4:08
6. "I Wanna Be With You" – 4:25
7. "Saturday Night" – 4:58
8. "48 Hours" – 3:06
9. "Summer Luv" – 4:42
10. "Your Mama Won't Know" – 4:07
11. "Restless" – 4:25
12. "Set the Nite on Fire" – 3:36
13. "Department of Youth" (Alice Cooper cover) – 2:59

=== Bonus tracks ===
A Japanese edition with the same cover was released in 2000. It featured two bonus tracks.

1. Shut Up
2. Junkie Girl (mislabeled as Stupid Girl on Japan edition)

== Band ==
- Steve "Sex" Summer – vocals
- Kristy "Krash" Majors – lead guitar
- Keri Kelli – rhythm guitar
- Keff Ratcliffe – bass
- Kari Kane – drums

== Credits ==
- Pretty Boy Floyd – production
- Howard Benson – production
- Darian Rundall – engineering
- Lou Hemsey – mastering
- Kevin Perttula – photography
