= The Battle of Sealand =

Studio album by Airiel
- Released: August 21, 2007
- Genres: Dream pop; shoegaze
- Length: 63:22
- Label: Highwheel Records
- Producer: David Golitko

Airiel chronology
The Battle of Sealand (2007)	Molten Young Lovers (2017)

Professional ratings
Review scores
Source	Rating
AllMusic	3.5/5 stars
Pitchfork	(5/10)
Stylus Magazine	(B)

The Battle of Sealand is the debut studio album by American shoegaze band Airiel. It was released August 21, 2007, on Chicago-based Highwheel Records. The album was named after the Principality of Sealand.

According to an article on the Sealand News website, the members of the band were named official lords of Sealand in recognition of naming their album after the self-proclaimed micronation. On September 30, 2007, it was announced that Airiel would be the first rock band to perform at Sealand; however, the concert did not take place.

The band lineup for the album's recording included guitarist Chris DeBrizzio, bassist/vocalist Cory Osborne, drummer John Rungger and guitarist/vocalist Jeremy Wrenn. German electronic musician, remixer and Tangerine Dream member Ulrich Schnauss made a guest appearance on the track "Sugar Crystals".

== Track listing ==
1. Introduction – 3:28
2. Thinktank – 4:21
3. Thrown Idols – 3:32
4. Sugar Crystals – 5:16
5. You Kids Should Know Better – 7:59
6. Mermaid in a Manhole – 4:36
7. Stay – 6:16
8. Peoria – 5:13
9. The Release – 2:48
10. Red Friends – 5:10
11. The Big Mash-Up – 14:43
12. Sealand – 2:17 [hidden track]
