= Pretty Boy Floyd (Canadian band) =

Canadian hard rock band

- Origin: Vancouver, British Columbia, Canada
- Genres: Hard rock, glam metal
- Years active: 1987 – 1990
- Past members: Tommy Floyd; Pete Parker; Steve Bratz; Sandy Hazard

Pretty Boy Floyd was a Canadian hard rock band from Vancouver, British Columbia, Canada.

== History ==
This Canadian hard rock band released an EP and an LP, both named Bullets & Lipstik.

They were most successful in the United Kingdom, where Bullets & Lipstik was a Top 10 hit on the indie charts in 1988.

During their career, the band opened for Skid Row, Hurricane, Savatage, Teenage Head, and Jailhouse. The Canadian Pretty Boy Floyd got into a legal battle with the American Pretty Boy Floyd. The Canadians owned the rights to the name, but could not proceed legally as the American Pretty Boy Floyd had filed for the American trademark. The American PBF could not use the name "Pretty Boy Floyd" on the Karate Kid III soundtrack and was forced to use the acronym "PBF". When the American band was signed to MCA Records, Kerrang magazine mistakenly printed the Canadian band's picture with the heading "Floyd Signs To MCA" The band renamed itself Tommy Floyd (after the lead singer) following the departure of guitarist Pete Parker. Tommy Floyd added two guitars and retained the original PBF rhythm section for a short period prior to regrouping with a new solo line up.

Singer/songwriter and founder Tommy Floyd went on to launch the music management company Outlaw Entertainment International, working with members of Salty Dog, Dangerous Toys, and Celtic Frost. Outlaw Recordings helped former PBF guitarist Pete Parker in the launching of his blues-based trio, Billy Butcher.

== Line-up ==
- Tommy Floyd - lead vocals
- Pete Parker - guitar
- Steve Bratz - bass guitar
- Sandy Hazard - drums

== Discography ==
- Bullets & Lipstik (EP) Hanover Records (1988)
- Bullets & Lipstik (CD/LP) Bellaphon Records 1989
- Bullets & Lipstik (Cassette/LP) Music Line Records 1989
