= Arielle Nobile =

American film director

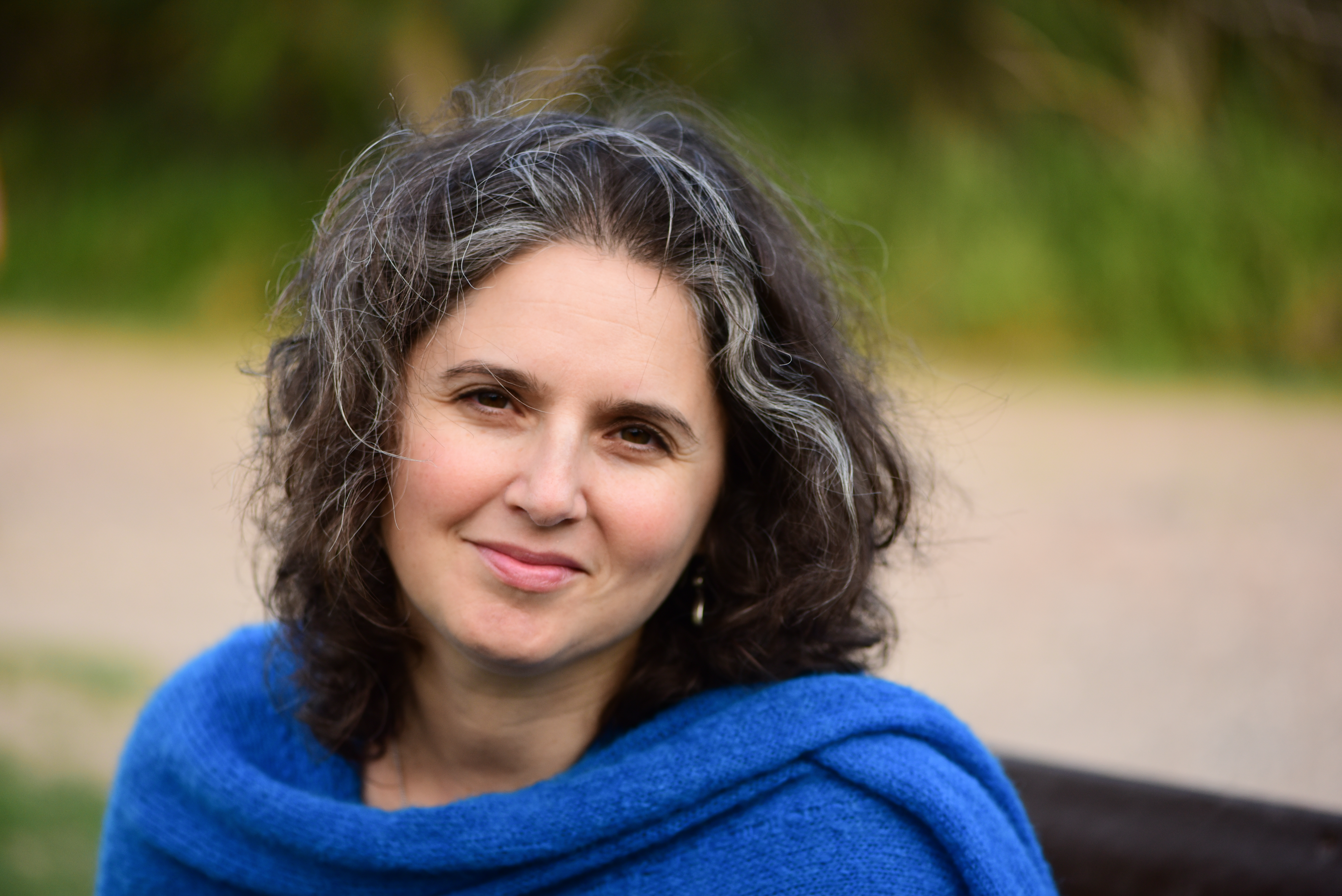

Arielle Nobile (born November 26, 1979) is an American film director and producer known primarily for her documentary work.

She has won multiple awards for her film Belonging In The USA: The Story of Michael D. McCarty. These include Best Documentary from Borderscene Film Festival, Award of Merit from the Impact Doc Awards, Excellence award from Docs Without Borders Film Festival, Hugo Television Award and Honorable Mention from the San Francisco Black Film Festival.

In 2012, Nobile also directed and produced Belonging In The USA: The Story of Alicia & Antonio, 813 Lake Street, and Belonging In Boulder: Unexpected Stories From Your Neighbors, which won a Hugo Television Award of Merit.

== Early life ==
Nobile was born in Evanston, IL, and grew up in Wilmette, IL, USA. Nobile is the daughter of Michelle Williams, a fiber and bead artist, and art teacher, and Jeff Williams, an attorney.

At age 9, Nobile began studying at Piven Theatre Workshop and then, during high school, went on to become a part of the Young People’s Company at Piven. Nobile then went on to a teaching apprenticeship at Piven Theatre Workshop; upon graduating from New Trier High School in 1997, she relocated to New York City.

== Career ==
Nobile attended the experimental theater wing of New York University Tisch School of the Arts, earning a Bachelor of Fine Arts degree (BFA) in Drama in 2001. After graduating from college Nobile returned to Illinois and taught at Piven Theatre Workshop. She then went on to study directing at The Second City in Chicago, IL, followed by teaching there.

After many years as an actor, Nobile founded the company Legacy Connections Films in 2005, a film company that produces broadcast-quality documentary films for families throughout the world.

In 2018 Nobile was named one of the Ten Filmmakers to Watch by Independent Magazine. In 2022, Nobile was invited to TedX Wilmette to share how The Simple Art of Listening Can Be Revolutionary. In 2022 Nobile accepted the role of Dean of Equity and Inclusion for Purposeful Planning Institute.

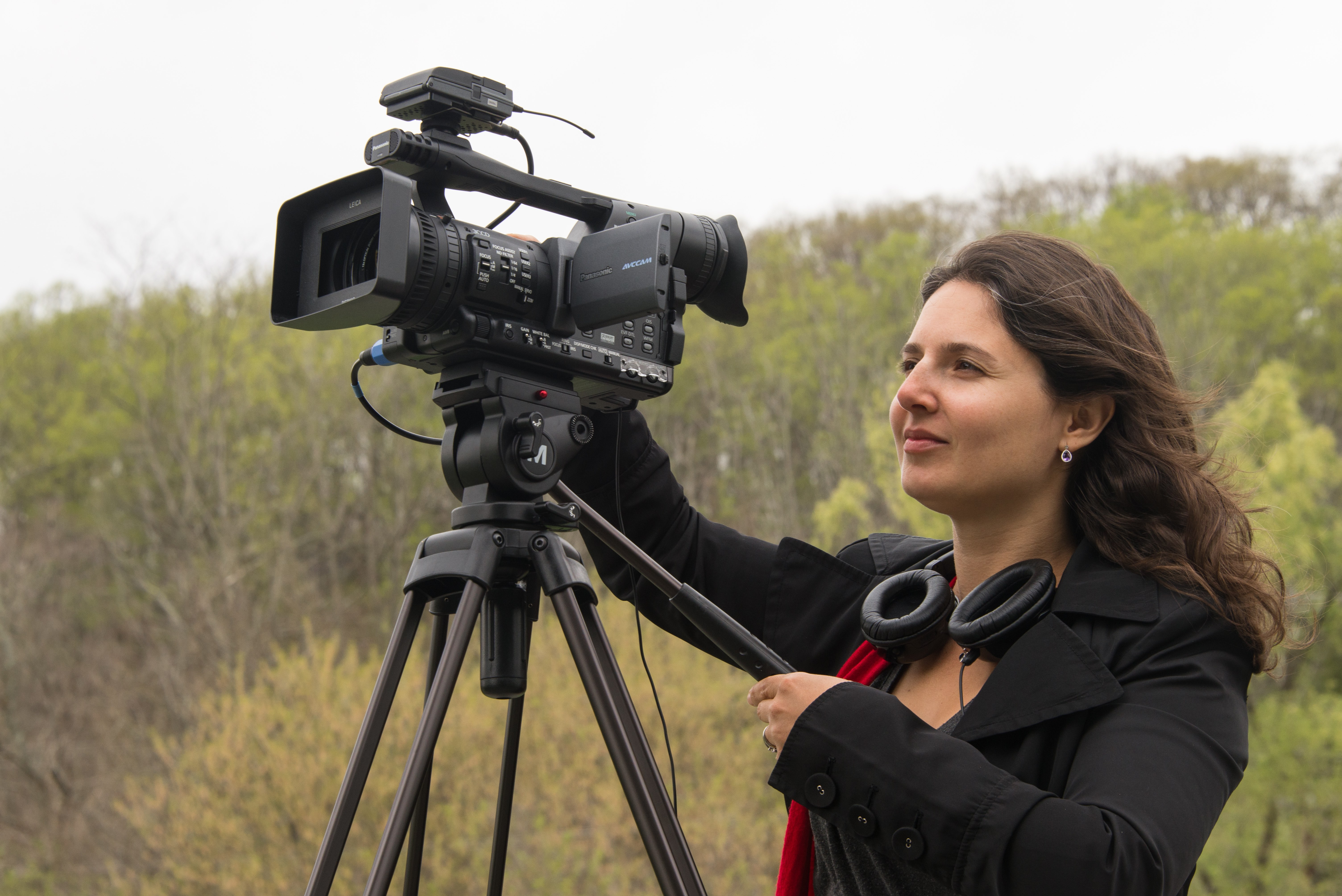

=== Belonging In The USA ===
During the 2016 presidential election, Nobile noticed, along with many others, the divisiveness that was happening in the USA. This partly inspired Nobile to start the documentary film series Belonging In The USA: Stories From Our Neighbors. “I could not sit by and do nothing,” said Nobile, “I would not allow myself to fall into the pit of the “us vs. them” polarization trap.”

The series was created as a way to connect humanity through the life stories of freedom fighters. Each film in the documentary series is framed by historical and cultural influences, wisdom garnered as a result of lived experience, and what belonging means to each subject in their own life context.

The first film in the series, Belonging In The USA: The Story of Michael D. McCarty, premiered in February 2019 at the Pan African Film Festival in Los Angeles, CA. It tells the story of professional storyteller Michael D. McCarty. The story of a man who, even in the face of great obstacles, spreads joy wherever he goes. Michael shares his varied life experiences. Including times as an aspiring scientist, Black Panther Party member, FBI target, soldier, drug addict, health nut, and storyteller.

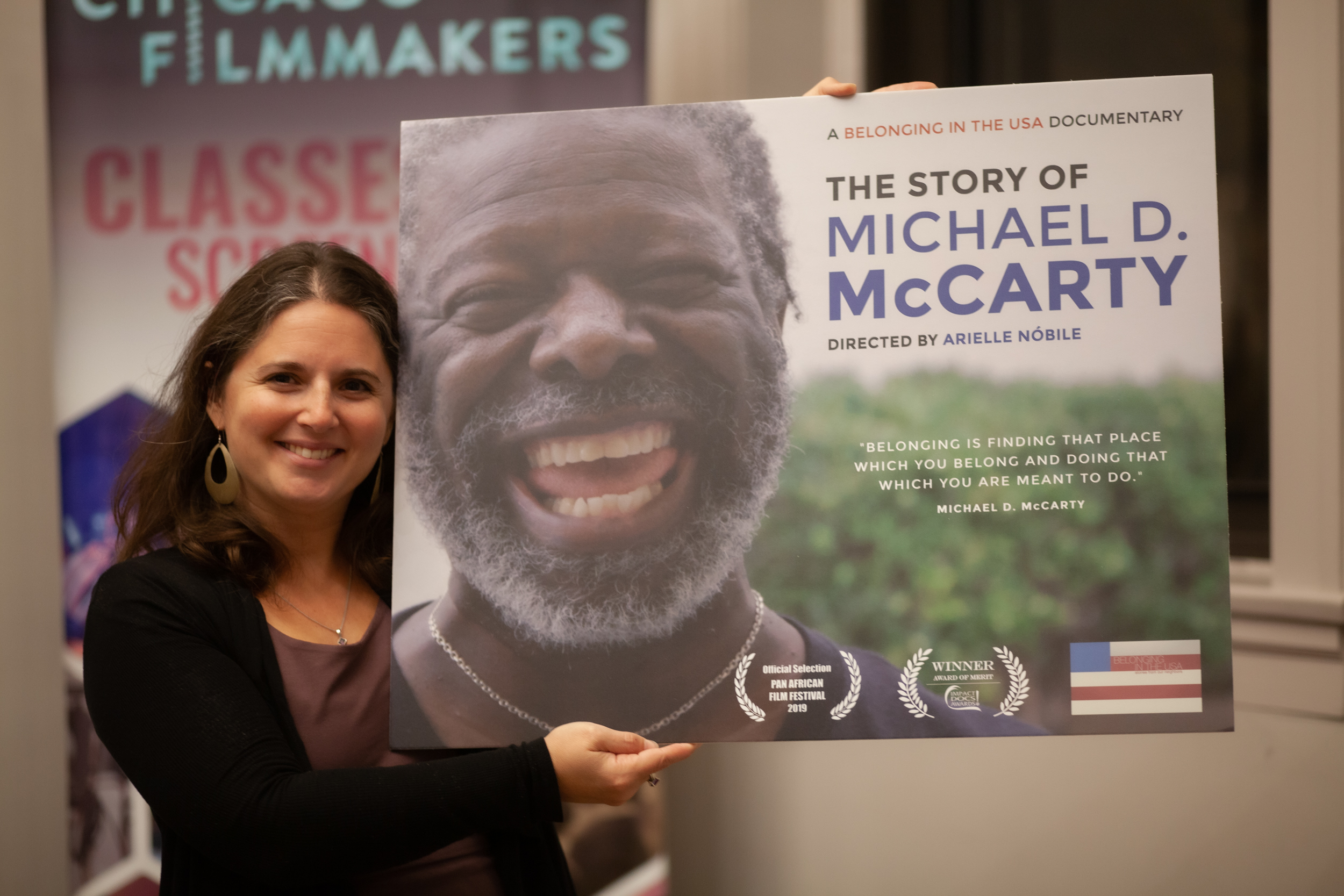

The second film in the series is titled Belonging In The USA: The Story of Alicia & Antonio. It was filmed in Chicago, LA, and New Jersey in 2018 and is currently in post-production. It features the life stories of a poet, political activist, and professor Alicia Partnoy and her filmmaker, activist husband Antonio Leiva. Alicia and Antonio are both political refugees forced into exile after being imprisoned and tortured for their social justice work during Argentina's Dirty War of the 1970s.

The third film in the series is titled Belonging In The USA: The Story of the Tsuchiya Family. The film is currently in production and is filming in Chicago, Los Angeles, Berkeley, Manzanar, and Japan. It features Lourdes Nicholls and her journey to discover and share the life stories of her grandparents. Lourdes's grandparents were incarcérées at Manzanar, a California Japanese Internment camp during WWII and her mother Fumi was born there.

== Personal life ==
Nobile splits time between US and Argentina with her husband and daughter.

== Filmography ==
- 2008: 813 Lake Street
- 2011: Belonging In Boulder: Unexpected Stories From Your Neighbors
- 2019: Belonging In The USA: The Story of Michael D. McCarty
- 2018: Belonging In The USA: The Story of Alicia & Antonio
- 20.. Belonging In The USA: The Story of the Tsuchiya Family

== Awards ==
- 2012: Hugo Television Award of Merit
- 2018: Impact Doc Awards. Award of Merit, Belonging In The USA: The Story of Michael D. McCarty
- 2019: Borderscene Film Festival. Best Documentary, Belonging In The USA: The Story of Michael D. McCarty
- 2019: Docs Without Borders. Excellence Award, Belonging In The USA: The Story of Michael D. McCarty
- 2019: San Francisco Black Film Festival. Honourable Mention, Belonging In The USA: The Story of Michael D. McCarty
- 2019: Awareness Festival, Los Angeles, CA: Special Jury Awards 2019 - Uplifting Award: “Belonging in the USA: The Story of Michael D. McCarty”
