= Ariel (name) =

- Pronunciation: /ˈɛəriəl/ or /ˈɑːriəl/ Hebrew: [ʔaʁiˈʔel] or Hebrew: [ʔariˈʔel] Spanish: [aˈɾjel]
- Gender: Mainly male but less common for female
- Language: Hebrew

Origin
- Origin: Ancient Israel
- Meaning: Lion of God
- Region of origin: Ancient Israel

Other names
- Alternative spelling: Ariël, Aryel, Ariella, Arielle (American/French amalgamation)
- Variant form: Ari

Ariel is a given name from Biblical Hebrew אריאל Ariel that literally means "lion of God". The female form is אריאלה (transliterated as Ariela, Ariella, or the alternative English and French spelling Arielle). In modern Hebrew, Ariel is primarily used as a male name.

Common short forms of Ariel are Ari Arie and Arik for boys. It also appears as a surname.

== People with the given name Ariel ==
- Ariel Atkins (born 1996), American basketball player
- Ariel Behar (born 1989), Uruguayan tennis player
- Ariel Besse (1965–2022), French actress
- Ariel Bibas (2019–2023), Israeli kidnapping and murder victim
- Ariel Bloomer (born 1988), singer for American rock band Icon for Hire
- Ariel Borysiuk (born 1991), Polish footballer playing as a defensive midfielder
- Ariel Serena Hedges Bowen (1863–1904), American writer and activist
- Ariel Bybee (1943–2018), American singer
- Ariel Castro (1960–2013), former school bus driver and convicted kidnapper of three women
- Ariel Dorfman (born 1942), Chilean-American writer
- Ariel Durant (1898–1981), American historian
- Ariel Ekblaw (born 1992), American aerospace architect
- Ariel Gade (born 1997), American former actress
- Ariel Garten (born 1979), Canadian artist, scientist, and co-founder of InteraXon
- Ariel Gore (born 1970), American writer
- Ariel Helwani (born 1982), Canadian journalist
- Ariel Kalma (1947–2025), French new-age composer and electronic musician
- Ariel Kaplan (born 1994), Australian actress
- Ariel Leve (born 1968), British journalist
- Ariel Levy (born 1974), American journalist
- Ariel Lin (born 1982), Taiwanese actress and singer
- Ariel McDonald (born 1972), American-Slovenian basketball player
- Ariel Meredith (born 1986), American model
- Ariel Muchirahondo (born 2009), New Zealand swimmer
- Ariel Muzicant (born 1952), Austrian Jewish community leader
- Ariel Nahuelpan (born 1987), Argentinian soccer player
- Ariel Ortega (born 1974), Argentinian soccer player
- Ariel Oxaal, American politician
- Ariel Pestano (born 1974), Cuban baseball player
- Ariel Pink (born 1978), American musician
- Ariel Porat (born 1956), Israeli jurist and academic
- Ariel Ramírez (1921–2010), Argentine composer and pianist
- Ariel Rios (1954–1982), American ATF agent
- Ariel Rivera (born 1966), Filipino singer and actor
- Ariel Robles (born 1991), Costa Rican politician
- Ariel Rot (born 1960), Argentine musician
- Ariel Schulman (born 1981), American actor, film director, and producer
- Ariel Sharon (1928–2014), Israeli military officer and politician
- Ariel Tatum (born 1996), Indonesian actress, model, and singer
- Ariel Troster (born 1979), Canadian politician
- Ariel Ureta (born 1946), Filipino actor, host and comedian
- Ariel Vromen (born 1973), Israeli film director and screenwriter
- Ariel Waldman, American explorer and filmmaker
- Ariel Winter (born 1998), American actress
- Ariel Ze'evi (born 1977), Israeli judoka

== People with the stage / ring, etc. name Ariel ==
- Nazril Irham (born 1981), Indonesian singer using the mononym "Ariel"
- Shelly Martinez (born 1980), American former professional wrestler who performed under the ring name "Ariel"

== People with the surname Ariel ==
- Adam Ariel (born 1994), Israeli basketball player in the Israel Basketball Premier League
- Gideon Ariel (born 1939), Israeli former Olympian in the shot put and discus throw
- Meir Ariel (1942–1999), Israeli singer-songwriter
- Uri Ariel (born 1952), Israeli politician
- Yisrael Ariel (born 1939), Israeli rabbi and founder of the Temple Institute

== Fictional characters ==
- Ariel (The Tempest), a sylph, a character in William Shakespeare's play The Tempest
- Ariel, an evil angel and pagan god in John Milton's Paradise Lost
- Ariel, a sylph, the protector of Belinda in Alexander Pope's The Rape of the Lock
- Ariel Moore, a character in the 1984 movie Footloose
- Ariel (The Little Mermaid), a mermaid princess from Disney's 1989 film The Little Mermaid
- Ariel, a recurring character in the ABC television series Once Upon a Time
- Ariel Manto, the protagonist of The End of Mr. Y by Scarlett Thomas
- Ariel Maloney, a character in the movie Soapdish
- Ariel Hawksquill, a mage in John Crowley's epic Little, Big
- Ariel Flyer, a bilingual flight and wildlife specialist from the Mountain Action Command Center Team in Rescue Heroes (TV series) and Rescue Heroes: The Movie
- Ariel Schiller, a character in the 2007 movie Starting Out in the Evening
- Ariel Truax, a character in the movie Grumpy Old Men
- Detective Ariel, one of two police inspectors on the case of a triple child murder in Martin McDonagh's The Pillowman
- Ari Gold (Entourage) a character in the HBO series Entourage
- Ariel DuBois, a character in the NBC drama Medium
- Ariel (Robotech), a character in the science fiction series Robotech
- Ariel (comics), a fictional character in the Marvel Comics Universe
- Ariel, alias of the Marvel Comics character Kitty Pryde
- Princess Ariel (Thundarr the Barbarian), a main character in the Thundarr the Barbarian animated series
- Ariel, a female Transformer in Transformers
- Ariel Kyho (吳彩欣), a character in the TVB television drama A Kindred Spirit
- Ariel (Legacy of Kain), a character in the Legacy of Kain video game series
- Ariel Sullivan, a character in the movie In America
- Ariel, a character in the ABC Family mini-series Fallen
- Ariel, the hero of the concept albums Epica and The Black Halo by American power metal band Kamelot
- Ariel, the prime antagonist in Isobelle Carmody's fantasy series The Obernewtyn Chronicles
- Ariel Wolfe, a character in the movie Return to House on Haunted Hill
- Ariel, Mage Queen of Loren, the semi-divine queen of the Wood Elves in the Warhammer tabletop wargame setting
- Ariel, a unicorn in Steve Boyett's novel Ariel
- Ariel Alderman, third season antagonist on the Nip/Tuck television series
- Ariel Kirkwood, a character in the novel Truly, Madly Manhattan by Nora Roberts
- Ariel Aldrin, a character in the daytime television series As the World Turns from 1982 to 1985
- Ariel, a character in the first-season episode "Angel One" of the television series Star Trek: The Next Generation
- Ariel Hunter, a character in the 1994–95 season of the television series Beverly Hills, 90210
- Ariel Anemoi Asura, a character in the light novel series Mushoku Tensei
- Demon Lord Ariel from the light novel series So I'm a Spider, So What?
- Ariel, secondary protagonist of the 2018 movie Maquia: When the Promised Flower Blooms
- Ariel Conroy, antagonist in the television series You, Me, and the Apocalypse

== See also ==
- Ariel (angel), an angel in Judaism, Christianity (Gnostic) and occult lore
- Ariel (disambiguation)
- Arielle (given name)
