= Arielle (given name) =

Arielle is a feminine given name and an alternative spelling of the name Ariel. Notable people with the name include:

- Arielle, 7th-century Breton saint
- Arielle Charnas, American blogger
- Arielle Dombasle (born 1958) French-American actress
- Arielle Free (born 1988), Scottish DJ and TV & radio presenter
- Arielle Gold (born 1996), American Olympic bronze medalist and World Champion snowboarder
- Arielle Greenberg (born 1972), American poet
- Arielle Holmes (born 1993), American actress
- Arielle Jacobs, American actress
- Arielle Kebbel (born 1985), American film and television actress
- Arielle Martin (born 1985), American BMX cyclist
- Ariel Nicholson, American fashion model
- Arielle Nobile (born 1979), American film director and producer
- Arielle North Olson (born 1932), American author of children's books
- Arielle Prepetit, American actress
- Arielle Ship (born 1995), American soccer player
- Arielle Tepper (born 1972), American theater producer
- Arielle Vandenberg (born 1986), American actress

== See also ==
- Ariel (name)
