= Pretty Boy Floyd (American band) =

American glam metal band

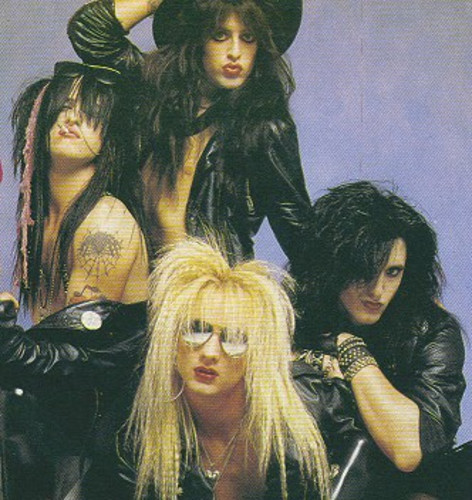

Background information
- Origin: Hollywood, California, U.S.
- Genre: Glam metal
- Years active: 1986–1994, 1995–present
- Labels: MCA; Cleopatra; Frontiers; Deadline
- Members: Steve "Sex" Summers; DieTrich Thrall; Jake Curtis Allard; Matt Muckle
- Past members: Lonny Paul; Dizzy Aster; Kriz DK; Aeriel Stiles

Pretty Boy Floyd is a glam metal band from Hollywood, California, formed in 1986 by original guitarist Aeriel Stiles and vocalist Steve "Sex" Summers. They are most famous for their 1989 debut album Leather Boyz with Electric Toyz and the two singles from it; "Rock and Roll (Is Gonna Set the Night on Fire)" and "I Wanna Be with You". The band broke up in 1994 but reformed in 1995, releasing several new records since that time, and continue to the present.

== History ==
After rehearsing and playing eight shows on the Sunset Strip, Pretty Boy Floyd got their big break at MCA Records. Their debut album named Leather Boyz with Electric Toyz was released in 1989 and produced by producer Howard Benson.

Two singles, and accompanying promotional videos were released from the album; "Rock and Roll (Is Gonna Set the Night on Fire)" and "I Wanna Be with You", which gained rotation on MTV. They were also having success in Europe at the time, by being the cover subject of hard rock magazine Kerrang! on December 16, 1989.

Pretty Boy Floyd became embroiled in a dispute over the copyright of their band name, with a Canadian band, also called Pretty Boy Floyd. The Canadian group released their debut Bullets and Lipstik the same year, but after a negotiated settlement agreed to surrender use of the name.

Their music featured on two film soundtracks, first the demo version of "48 Hours" was included on the 1989 film The Karate Kid Part III. Two years later the previously unreleased "Slam Dunk" was released on the Ellen Barkin movie Switch soundtrack. However, by that time MCA Records had dropped the band. They broke up in spring 1994.

By late 1995 Pretty Boy Floyd had reformed. They recorded a five-song EP, A Tale of Sex, Designer Drugs, and the Death of Rock n' Roll, in 1998. The band featured former Big Bang Babies guitarist Keri Kelli, Steve Summers (Steven Podwalski), Kristy Majors (Chris Maggiore, Jr.), Keff Ratcliffe and Kari Kane (Cary Ayers).

In February 2006 they toured the United States and then broke up again. Majors released Sex, Drugs 'N' Rock N Roll and toured Europe in March 2007. On March 1, 2008, Majors and Kane joined Summers to play on stage at The Knitting Factory in Hollywood, California. In 2009, the band celebrated their 20th anniversary of the release of Leather Boyz with Electric Toyz with a world tour. Troy Patrick Farrell was hired as the drummer, and Criss 6 of Los Angeles–based Mötley Crüe tribute band True 2 Crue was hired as the new bassist.

Original bassist, Vinnie Chas (Charles Pusateri) died on April 5, 2010, from heart failure.

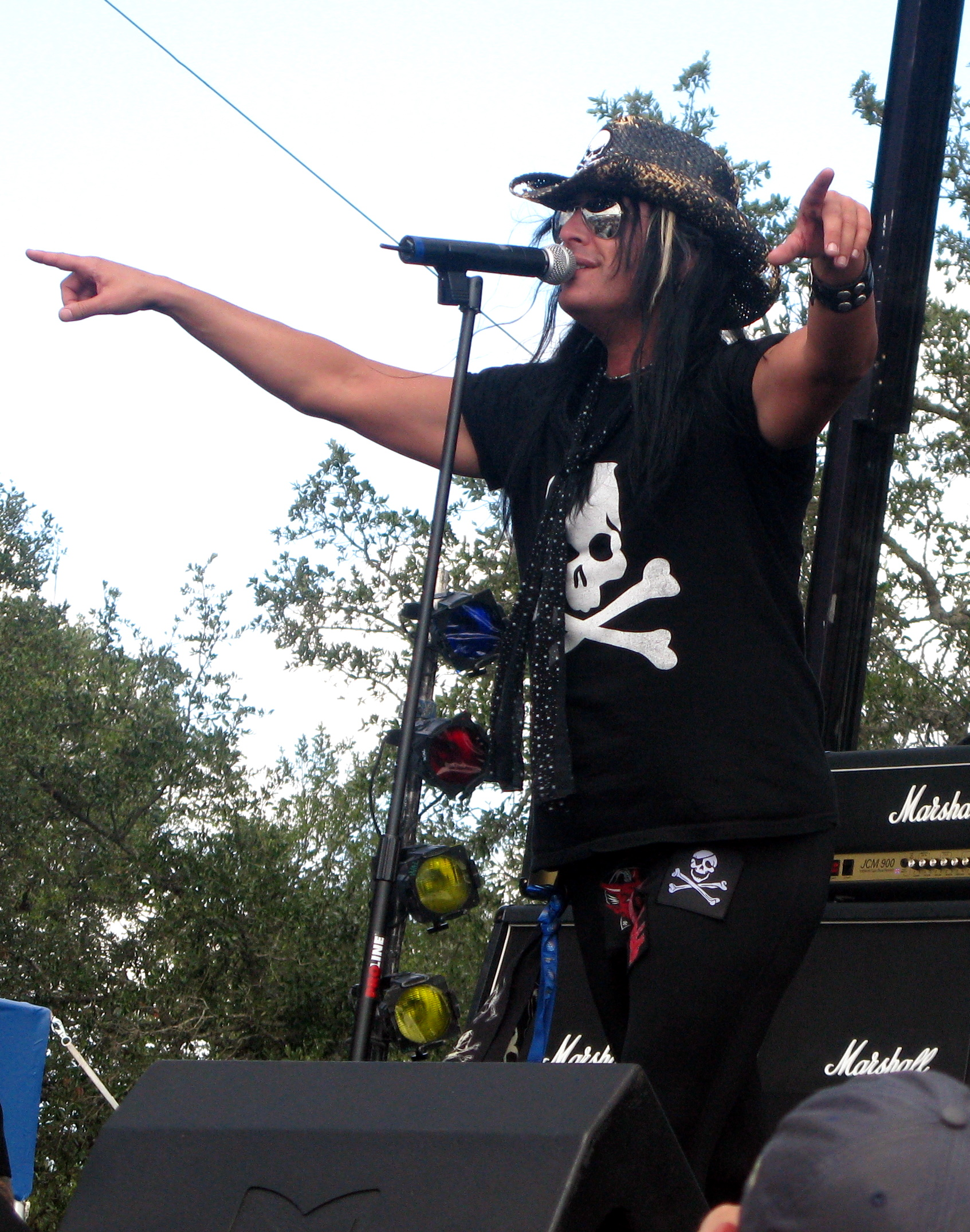
Steve Summers in 2008

In April 2011, they announced a new album of original material and a tour to support the album. The band has also announced that Ben Graves formerly of Murderdolls and has been hired as the new drummer. They set out on the "America Rocks Tour" with Jack Russell's Great White, Faster Pussycat and Lillian Axe on June 15, 2012. During the tour, Majors and Summers got into an argument and the band ended up quitting the tour early. In April 2014 Majors announced his new band, "Kristy Majors and the Thrill Kills", which consisted of two previous members of Pretty Boy Floyd: JK Famous on bass and Ben Graves on drums. The band released one album and one music video.

Summers kept busy by doing an album for the band Shameless as well as doing some solo shows worldwide.

In July 2015, Steve Summers and Kristy Majors announced they would reunite together and were in the process of finishing their album. The new version of the band included JK Famous on bass and Tod "T" Burr on drums. The band debuted at the Cathouse Live 30th Anniversary Festival in Irvine, California, and had a string of shows to follow. The band continued to tour through 2016 and were awarded at the Hair Metal Awards show in Las Vegas alongside Scorpions and Twisted Sister. In August 2016, the band parted ways with Tod "T" Burr and brought back Ben Graves on drums.

In December 2017, the band released Public Enemies. The album was described by Majors as "The true follow up to Leather Boyz With Electric Toyz". They released a music video for the first single, "Feel The Heat". The album was well received by fans and critics which resulted in shows worldwide in 2018.

On May 9, 2018, drummer Ben Graves died after an 11-month battle with cancer. Former Sweet F.A. Drummer Nick "Tricky" Lane was added to the lineup the same year, making his first appearance with the band at Frontiers Rock Festival in Italy.

The band continues to play shows around the world, most recently touring the U.K. and Europe throughout 2022.

== Members ==
Current

- Steve "Sex" Summers – vocals (1986–1994, 1995–present)
- DieTrich Thrall – bass (2023–2024, 2025–present)
- Jake Curtis Allard – guitars (2025–present)
- Matt Muckle – drums (2025–present)

Former

- Aeriel Stiles — guitars (1986–1988, 1991–1994)
- Vinnie Chas — bass (1987–1994) (died 2010)
- Keff Ratcliffe – bass (1995–1999)
- Kari Kane – drums (1987–1994, 1995–2000, 2008)
- Keri Kelli — guitars (1995–1999, 2000–2001)
- JK Famous – bass (2006–2008, 2016–2019)
- Traci Michaelz - drums (2004-2005)
- Eddie Electra - bass (2004-2005)
- T'Chad – guitar (2003–2004)
- Lesli Sanders – bass (2001–2004)
- Dish – drums (2001–2004)
- Davey Lister - guitars (2007-2009)
- Scotti Dee - drums (2007-2008)
- Mikki Twist - bass (2007-2008)
- Jimmy Mess – drums (2017–2019)
- Tod "T" Burr – drums (2015–2016)
- Ben Graves – drums (2016–2017) (died 2018)
- Vikki Foxx – drums (2019–2021)
- Kristy "Krash" Majors – guitars (1988–1990, 1995–2003, 2006-2019)
- Criss 6 – bass (2019–2023)
- Eric Griffin - guitars (2021-2022)
- Diego "Ashes" Ibarra – guitars, bass (2021–2023)
- Nick Mason – drums (2021–2024)
- Lonny Paul - bass (2024–2025)
- Dizzy Aster – guitars (2023–2025)
- Kriz DK – drums (2024–2025)

== Discography ==
=== Studio albums ===
- Leather Boyz with Electric Toyz (1989) US No. 130
- Size Really Does Matter (2004)
- Public Enemies (2017)

=== EPs ===
- A Tale of Sex, Designer Drugs, and the Death of Rock n' Roll (1998)

=== Live albums ===
- Live at the Pretty Ugly Club (2001)
- Live on the Sunset Strip (Pretty Ugly Club reissue with 4 bonus tracks) (2014)

=== Compilation albums ===
- Porn Stars (1999)
- The Vault (2002)
- The Vault II (2003)
- Tonight Belongs to the Young - Remastered demos (2003)
- Dirty Glam – (2004)
- The Greatest Collection – The Ultimate Pretty Boy Floyd (2004)
- Glam as Fuck – Vinyl (2009)
- Kiss of Death: A Tribute to KISS (2010)
- Stray Bullet (2019)

=== Singles ===
- "Rock and Roll (Is Gonna Set the Night on Fire)" (1989)
- "I Wanna Be with You" (1989)
- "Do You Wanna Touch" (2008)

=== Other recordings ===
- "Happy Family": We Wish You a Hairy Christmas (2007)
- "Girls, Girls, Girls": Crue Believers – A Tribute to Motley Crue (2008)
