= USS Ariel =

Five ships of the United States Navy have been named Ariel, after the sprite Ariel in William Shakespeare's play The Tempest.

- USS Ariel (1777), a 16-gun sloop-of-war, originally the Royal Navy's HMS Ariel captured by the French in 1779, lent to the Americans in 1780, and returned to the French the next year.
- USS Ariel (1813), a schooner launched on Lake Erie in 1813 and active in operations that year.
- USS Ariel (1831), was a schooner built in Baltimore as Fourth of July. The US Navy commissioned her as USS Fourth of July in May 1831. She was renamed Ariel on 9 June. She was decommissioned on 31 December 1832 and sold on 3 January 1833.
- USS Ariel (1862), schooner captured in the American Civil War and used by the Navy until 1865.
- USS Ariel (AF-22), a passenger and refrigerated cargo liner leased from the United Fruit Company and used from 1942 to 1946.
