= Ariel (American automobile) =

Defunct American motor vehicle manufacturer

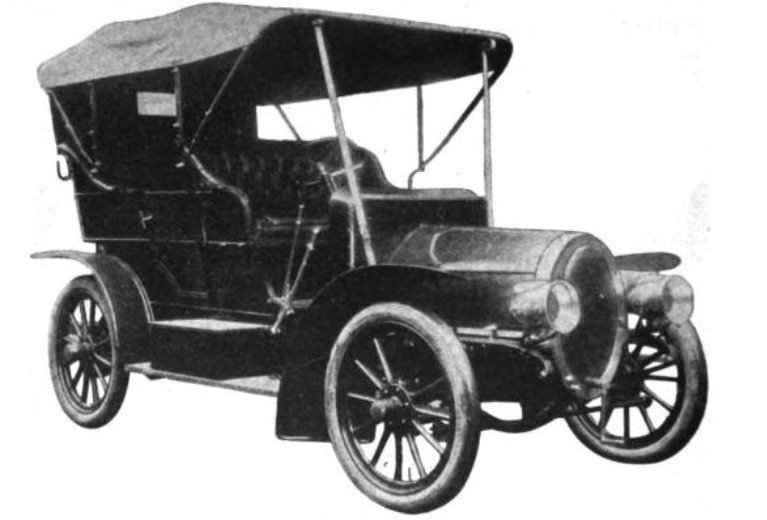
1906 Ariel Type IV

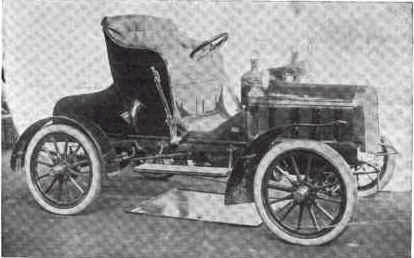
1905 Ariel Type III Roadster

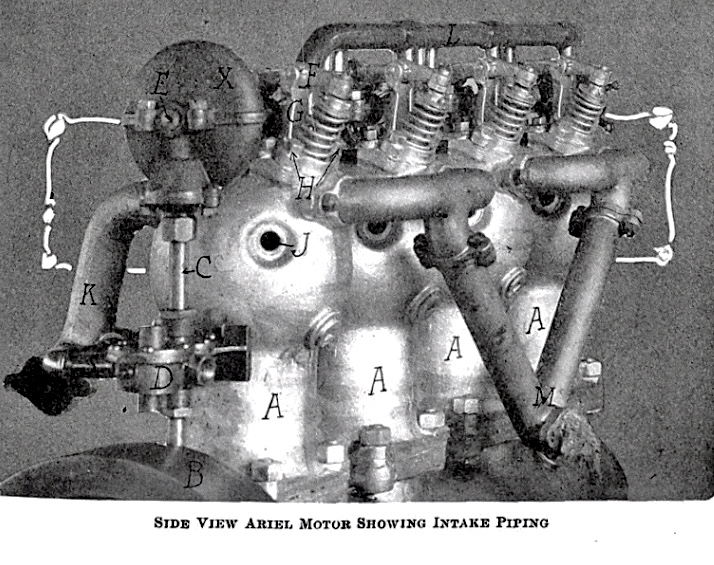
Ariel Type IV Engine 28/30 HP with 3942 cc, bore 111,125 mm and stroke 101,6 mm

The Ariel was an American automobile manufactured by the Ariel Motor Car Company from 1905 to 1906 in Boston, and, briefly, in Bridgeport, Connecticut. The factory has a building whose main structure is 312 feet long and 52 feet wide, with three floors. There are other buildings on the premises that can be used if necessary.

The car was available with either an air-cooled or a water-cooled engine, either of which had a single overhead camshaft and delivered 30 horsepower. The radiator was oval in shape, similar to those of Delaunay-Belleville cars. Ariel's slogan, "Look for the Oval Front," was based on this feature.

The company was incorporated in Boston near the end of 1904 with capital stock of $100,000. Officers of the company were Charles B. Lamont, Charles J. Palmer, and Joseph P. Alcort. Sales were handled by the Lewis & Matthews Company on Stanhope Street in Boston, which took over ownership of the Ariel line.

Production of the Ariel was moved to a factory in Bridgeport, Connecticut in 1906, but the factory closed after just three months when it was seized by the sheriff on behalf of unpaid creditors. The Ariel line was then taken over by the Sinclair-Scott Company of Baltimore, Maryland. Sinclair-Scott, a manufacturer of canning machinery, had also been making parts for Ariel and other auto companies. Sinclair-Scott changed the brand name to Maryland.
