= Aerial (Swedish band) =

Swedish post-rock band

- Origin: Sandviken, Sweden
- Genres: Alternative rock, art rock, post-punk, experimental rock, post-rock
- Labels: Nomethod records, Tangled Up!, Thomason Sounds Flake Records
- Members: Sebastian Arnström, Victor Claeson, Joakim Westlund, Markus Johansson, Niklas Wennerstrand
- Website: Aerial at myspace

Aerial is a post/indie-rock band from Sandviken, Sweden. They’ve released four full-length albums so far: “Black Rain From The Bombing” in 2006, “The Sentinel” in 2007, “The Legion of Dynamic Dischord” in 2008 and "Put it this way in headlines" in 2009. They have toured in Europe on several times, and they have played with acts such as; Bell Orchestre, Deerhunter, Arab Strap and Mono. Aerial was signed to Nomethod Records in 2006, and has since been released outside of Sweden by labels; Tangled Up!, Thomason Sounds and will be released in late 2009 by Flake Records. The lead singer and guitarist, Sebastian Arnström, is also a member of the semi-electronic indie act Simian Ghost.

== Members ==
- Sebastian Arnström - vocals, guitar, programming, drums
- Victor Claeson - vocals, guitar, programming
- Joakim Westlund - bass, guitar, synthesizers
- Markus Johansson - drums, synthesizers, guitar
- Niklas Wennerstrand - synthesizers, bass, guitar, vocals

== History ==
=== Biography ===
Aerial was co-founded in 2005 by Sebastian Arnström, Markus Johansson, Joakim Westlund and Victor Claeson. They all attended high school together, where they studied art, music and cinema. The band grew out of their common interest for mentioned expressions, and they have always been taking great pride in having total control over every aspect of their works. They recorded a self-released demo called You are which got the attention of Swedish indie label Nomethod Records. They recorded their debut album in a similar fashion and it was released in late 2006. Since then they have recorded two more full-length albums and one EP called The legion of dynamic dischord, a not so subtle reference to the American writer Robert Anton Wilson. Other writers mentioned in their work is Allen Ginsberg, H.P. Lovecraft, Arthur C. Clarke and Philip K. Dick. When they released The sentinel in 2007, bass player Joakim Westlund went to Peru and was substituted live by Niklas Wennerstrand, which upon Joakims return decided to stay as a regular member of the band.

=== Influences ===
As stated in interviews the band is widely influenced by acts such as Glenn Branca, Sonic Youth, Pavement, Yo la tengo, The Books, Rachel's, Animal Collective, Gastr del sol, The flaming lips and Black Dice. They also had a brief but notable period exploring the genre of post-rock, and was in doing so influenced by bands such as Mono, Mogwai and Explosions in the sky. The band has also said that it has no small debt to the works of kraut rock legends Kraftwerk and Neu!.

== Discography ==
=== Albums ===
- Black rain from the bombing - 2006
- The sentinel - 2007
- Put it this way in headlines - 2009

=== EP's ===
- The legion of dynamic dischord - 2008
- The legion of dynamic dischord - 2008

=== Singles ===
- Time is on fire - 2006
- My god it's full of stars - 2007
- You will all die, all things will - 2007
- Kallisti - 2008
- All refrain - 2009
