= Ariella Rush =

American ballroom dancer

Ariella (Aria) Maree Rush (born Mary Marie Stoehr June 9, 1956 in Canton, Ohio) is an American ballroom dancer noted for dazzling and complex dance routines with her various professional dance partners, the most notable being Keith Knox, from 1976 through 1981. Rush and Knox were best known for their tango, cha-cha and mambo routines, as well as, high-energy swing dancing. Rush made appearances all over the United States including Disney World in Orlando, Florida, Universal Studios, Six Flags Over Georgia, Six Flags Over Texas, the Roseland Ballroom in New York City and the Fox Theatre in Atlanta, Georgia. Rush is also credited under other aliases, including Arianna, Aria Rose, and Maree Champion.

Rush and Knox competed in professional ballroom dancing, and were named the 1979 Southeast Rising Star Champions at the National Dance Championships held at the Peachtree Plaza Hotel in Atlanta, GA. This win qualified them to compete in the most prestigious of all international dance competitions, Blackpool Dance Festival; however, an injury forced Rush's early retirement.

== Early life ==
Rush grew up as Marie Stoehr in Marietta, Georgia, and started dance and piano lessons at the age of five. She actively participated in talent shows throughout her childhood, appearing as a very young guest numerous times on Freddie Miller's television broadcasts, Stars of Tomorrow and Dance Party. She briefly competed in beauty pageants, winning runner up to the NGA Fair Queen at the North Georgia Fairgrounds in 1970. She later became a model and professional dancer, and taught ballroom dancing at Fred Astaire Dance Studios, in addition to performing and competing.

== Later years ==
After retiring from dancing and modeling, Rush produced programming for television broadcast in Georgia, North Carolina, and Tennessee from 1994 to 2000. She is most known for her creation, direction, and production of a weekly adventure series called The Highroad South which began in 1998, and aired in the Alltel cable system until December, 2000. Reruns of The Highroad continued, by popular demand, for two years after Rush shut down production for personal reasons.

In the 2000s, Rush promoted musicians and bands and was involved in music video choreography.

== Personal life ==
Rush currently lives in northeast Texas.
