= Ariel (newspaper) =

British newspaper

An edition of Ariel (October 2011)

Ariel was the in-house magazine/newspaper of the BBC, published weekly on Tuesdays, and named after Prospero and Ariel, the 1932 statue by Eric Gill on the facade of the BBC's Broadcasting House depicting Shakespeare's Prospero and Ariel.

== History ==
On 19 October 2011, it was announced that the printed edition would cease production at the end of December 2011 and then only be available as Ariel Online. Candida Watson, its editor, was one of the redundancies.

== Availability ==
Distributed as a newspaper for 75 years to staff and visitors at major BBC premises, it was also available to the public by subscription (£50 per annum UK). Ariel Online was accessed by corporation staff electronically over the BBC intranet (Gateway) and from 2011 to 2015 it was available via the BBC website.

== See also ==
An equivalent publication circulated each month to retired BBC staff called Prospero is also available online in PDF format.
