= Salty Dog (band) =

American rock band

- Origin: Los Angeles, California, U.S.
- Genres: Glam metal, hard rock, blues rock
- Years active: 1986-1993, (one-off reunion: 2011)
- Labels: Geffen, Escape
- Past members: Jimmi Bleacher; Pete Reveen; Michael Hannon; Khurt Maier; Scott Lane; Darrel Beach

Salty Dog was an American rock band from Los Angeles, formed in 1986 by former Max Havoc guitarist Scott Lane, bassist Michael Hannon, and drummer Khurt Maier who also played on Max Havoc's 1983 album. Later, they were joined by lead singer Jimmi Bleacher. The band was managed by Vicky Hamilton, who also managed Poison, Faster Pussycat, and Guns N' Roses.

== History ==
Before the recording of their debut album, guitarist Scott Lane was replaced by Pete Reveen in 1987. The band signed a record deal with Geffen and recorded their debut album Every Dog Has Its Day. The record was recorded at Rockfield Studios in Wales, and the band was reportedly not told by the label they had to pay back the recording costs. Salty Dog appeared on a flexi-disc along with the thrash metal band Nuclear Assault which appeared in issue 280 of Kerrang! magazine, where they covered the Sonny Boy Williamson song, "Sad To Be Alone".

Released in 1990, Every Dog Has Its Day peaked at No. 176 on the Billboard 200 chart. In 1991, Jimmi Bleacher was replaced by Darrel Beach, and, by 1993, the band had ceased activity. Members of Salty Dog went on to join bands such as Dangerous Toys, American Dog, Bogus Toms, Mudpie, and Tweed.

On December 10, 2011, Salty Dog reunited to perform a one-off reunion show at The Key Club in Hollywood, California.

On March 23, 2018, the French record label Escape Music released Lost Treasure, a collection of previously unreleased demos recorded with Darrel Beach.

In a 2021 interview, on the '80s Glam Metalcast with host Metal Mike, former Salty Dog bassist and current American Dog frontman Michael Hannon, said another Salty Dog reunion was not a possibility. Hannon said, "We did one reunion show in 2011 and it failed miserably. It was terrible, you can see it on YouTube. We only had two practices. We didn't have it together. I doubt we will ever get together again, but who knows. I would rather play with my buddies in American Dog instead of guys I have to look behind my back to see who’s gonna fuck me next. I like American Dog’s music better than Salty Dog’s. I’m kinda done with the past. At this point it’s not about money, I’m just doing it for fun."

== Members ==
=== Every Dog Has His Day and reunion line-up ===
- Jimmi Bleacher - vocals, guitar, keyboard, piano, harmonica
- Pete Reveen - guitar, banjo, backing vocals
- Michael Hannon - bass, backing vocals
- Khurt Maier - drums, percussion

=== Other members ===
- Scott Lane - guitar
- Darrel Beach - vocals

== Discography ==
- Every Dog Has Its Day (1990, Geffen)
- Lost Treasure (2018, Escape)
