= Airiel =

American shoegaze band

- Origin: Chicago, Illinois, U.S.
- Genres: Shoegaze; dream pop; experimental rock
- Years active: 1997–present
- Labels: Urinine; Roisin; Sonic Syrup; Clairecords; Sonicbaby; Highwheel; Shelflife
- Members: Jeremy Wrenn; Andrew Marrah
- Past members: Chris DeBrizzio; Mikey Pinaud; Cory Osborne; Chase Johnson; Andrew Puricelli; John Rungger; Zeeshan Abbasi; Nick Bertling; Matt Blanton; Spencer Kiss; Shawn Delaney
- Website: www.airiel.com

Airiel is an American shoegaze band from Chicago, Illinois. Frontman Jeremy Wrenn described Airiel's music by saying, "It's loud, it's pretty and you can dance to it".

== History ==
Airiel was formed as Airiel Project One in 1997, in Bloomington, Indiana, by guitarist/vocalist Jeremy Wrenn and former bandmate Shawn Delaney. This followed the breakup of Wrenn's previous shoegaze band, Black Olive, who had released one album, Verge. This early line-up recorded two songs for the There's Always An Ending Before A Beginning split EP with The Sunflower Conspiracy. After shortening their name to Airiel, their debut single, "Shirley Temple Tidal Wave", was released in 1999 by Roisin Recordings.

During 2003–2004, the band released a series of four Winks & Kisses EPs on Clairecords, each containing four songs. The EPs were later reissued as a box set, also titled Winks and Kisses.

In 2005, Airiel released a self-titled EP on Sonicbaby Records, and toured the eastern United States.

In 2007, the band recorded their debut full-length studio album, The Battle of Sealand, which was released on Highwheel Records that August 21. In honor of their contribution to the culture of the Principality of Sealand, a micronation, all the members of the band were named official lords of Sealand, and were invited to be the first rock band to play a concert in the nation, to be broadcast live over the internet. However, this concert did not take place.

Bassist/vocalist Cory Osborne and drummer John Rungger left the band in late 2007, and Airiel relocated to Bridgeport, a neighborhood on Chicago's South Side.

Airiel toured the UK and Ireland in April 2008 with Ulrich Schnauss, who had collaborated with the band on The Battle of Sealand track "Sugar Crystals".

After signing with Shelflife Records in 2011, Airiel returned in 2012 with the Kid Games EP.

On March 10, 2017, the "Cloudburst" single was issued. Their second studio album, Molten Young Lovers, was released by Shelflife on October 13, 2017.

The band, now the duo of Wrenn and Andrew Marrah, self-released the single "Bloom" on September 4, 2020, for Bandcamp Friday. The song is lead track from their forthcoming EP.

== Members ==
Current

- Jeremy Wrenn – vocals, guitar
- Andrew Marrah – guitar, synthesizers, programming

Former

- Chris DeBrizzio – guitar
- Mikey Pinaud – drums
- Cory Osborne – bass, vocals
- Chase Johnson - bass, synthesizers
- Andrew Puricelli – bass, vocals
- John Rungger – drums
- Zeeshan Abbasi – guitar
- Adam Reade Thompson - Guitar
- Matt Blanton – bass guitar
- Spencer Kiss – drums, synthesizers
- Nick Bertling - drums, bass
- Shawn Delaney - bass, vocals

== Discography ==
=== Studio albums ===
- The Battle of Sealand (2007, Highwheel Records)
- Molten Young Lovers (2017, Shelflife Records)

=== EPs ===
- Christmas Colors (2002, Sonic Syrup)
- Winks & Kisses: Frosted (2003, Clairecords)
- Winks & Kisses: Dizzy (2003, Clairecords)
- Winks & Kisses: Melted (2004, Clairecords)
- Winks & Kisses: Crackled (2004, Clairecords)
- Airiel (2005, Sonicbaby Records)
- Kid Games (2012, Shelflife Records)

=== Singles ===
- "Shirley Temple Tidal Wave" 7" (1999, Roisin Recordings)
- "In Your Room" 8" (2004, Sonic Syrup)
- "Cloudburst" digital (2017, Shelflife Records)
- "Bloom" digital (2020, Self-Released)

=== Compilation albums ===
- Winks & Kisses box set (2004, Clairecords)

=== Compilation appearances ===
- "Wasteland Cupid" and "Pineapple" on There's Always An Ending Before A Beginning (1998, Urinine Records)
- "Blowin' Cool" (Swervedriver cover) on Never Lose That Feeling Volume One (2005, Club AC30)
