= Ariel: The Book of Fantasy =

Ariel: The Book of Fantasy was a periodical book published by Peacock Press in the 1970s. Among the more famous stories published by this elaborately produced and illustrated (and, for the time, expensive) series was Larry Niven's "Source of Power".
