= Vinnie Chas =

American musical artist (1963–2010)

- Born: May 4, 1963; Honolulu, Hawaii, United States
- Died: April 6, 2010 (aged 46); Vancouver, Washington, United States
- Genres: Hard rock, glam metal
- Instrument(s): Bass guitar, vocals
- Years active: 1986–2010
- Labels: MCA
- Formerly of: Pretty Boy Floyd, Rattlin' Bones

Vincent Charles Pusateri (May 4, 1963 – April 6, 2010), best known by his stage name Vinnie Chas, was an American musician. Born in Honolulu, Hawaii, he moved to Washington State as a child and while growing up there, he went to Bethel High School and was in several bands with childhood friend Jerry Cantrell, including SINISTER and RAZE. In 1987, Chas joined Hollywood-based hard rock band Pretty Boy Floyd as their bassist. He died of heart failure on April 6, 2010, in Vancouver, Washington, and is buried in Spanaway, Washington.

== Discography ==
=== With Pretty Boy Floyd ===
- Leather Boyz With Electric Toyz - (1989)
- The Vault - (2002)
- Tonight Belongs to the Young Remastered demos - (2003)
- The Demos Collection - (2003)
- The Vault 2 - (2003)
- Dirty Glam - (2004)
- The Greatest Collection - The Ultimate Pretty Boy Floyd - (2004)

=== With Rattlin' Bones ===
- Rattlin' Bones (1995)
