= Airborn (band) =

Italian metal band

Airborn is an Italian power metal band. They released seven albums, among those three on Remedy Records and three on Fighter Records.

The band was formed in 1995 in Torino. The deal with Fighter Records was signed when Airborn released their Lizard Secrets series of albums.

== Select discography ==
- Against the World (2002)
- D-Generation (2003)
- Legend of Madog (2009)
- Dark Future Rising (2014)
- Lizard Secrets: Part One - Land of the Living (2018)
- Lizard Secrets: Part Two - Age of Wonder (2020)
- Lizard Secrets: Part Three - Utopia (2025)

The band also provided a version of "Unleash the Beast" to Eagleution, a tribute album to Saxon, as well as the track "Gardens of the Sinner" to Cosmic Rayz, a tribute album to Gamma Ray. In 2021 they released the live album Live Animals.
