= Sandin =

Sandin may refer to:

== Places ==
- Sandin 2-y, a village in Kuyurgazinsky District, Bashkortostan, Russia
- Sandino, Cuba
- Sandin, Kuyurgazinsky District, Republic of Bashkortostan, Russia
- Sandin, Zamora, Spain

== Other uses ==
- Sandin (name)
- Sandin Image Processor, a video synthesizer
- The Sandin family, in The Purge (2013 film)

== See also ==
- Augusto César Sandino (1895–1934), Nicaraguan revolutionary
