= Novomuraptalovo =

Novomuraptalovo Новомурапталово
- Selo
- Location within Bashkortostan Location within Russia
- Coordinates: 52°25′N 55°46′E
- Country: Russia
- Region: Bashkortostan
- District: Kuyurgazinsky District
- Time zone: UTC+5:00

Novomuraptalovo (Russian: Новомурапталово; Bashkir: Яңы Мораптал, Yañı Moraptal) is a rural locality (a selo) and the administrative centre of Muraptalovsky Selsoviet, Kuyurgazinsky District, Bashkortostan, Russia. The population was 1,289 as of 2010. There are 21 streets.

== Geography ==
Novomuraptalovo is located 37 km south of Yermolayevo (the district's administrative centre) by road. Staromuraptalovo is the nearest rural locality.
