= Novaya Uralka =

Novaya Uralka Новая Уралка
- Village
- Location within Bashkortostan Location within Russia
- Coordinates: 52°40′N 55°49′E
- Country: Russia
- Region: Bashkortostan
- District: Kuyurgazinsky District
- Time zone: UTC+5:00

Novaya Uralka (Russian: Новая Уралка; Bashkir: Яңы Урал, Yañı Ural) is a rural locality (a village) in Otradinsky Selsoviet, Kuyurgazinsky District, Bashkortostan, Russia. The population was 232 as of 2010. There are 2 streets.

== Geography ==
Novaya Uralka is located 3 km south of Yermolayevo (the district's administrative centre) by road. Aysuak is the nearest rural locality.
