= Yalchikayevo =

Yalchikayevo Ялчикаево
- Village
- Location within Bashkortostan Location within Russia
- Coordinates: 52°47′N 55°33′E
- Country: Russia
- Region: Bashkortostan
- District: Kuyurgazinsky District
- Time zone: UTC+5:00

Yalchikayevo (Russian: Ялчикаево; Bashkir: Ялсыҡай, Yalsıqay) is a rural locality (a village) in Taymasovsky Selsoviet, Kuyurgazinsky District, Bashkortostan, Russia. The population was 386 as of 2010. There are 4 streets.

== Geography ==
Yalchikayevo is located 38 km northwest of Yermolayevo (the district's administrative centre) by road. Lena is the nearest rural locality.
