= Svoboda, Kuyurgazinsky District, Republic of Bashkortostan =

Svoboda Свобода
- Selo
- Location within Bashkortostan Location within Russia
- Coordinates: 52°45′N 55°26′E
- Country: Russia
- Region: Bashkortostan
- District: Kuyurgazinsky District
- Time zone: UTC+5:00

Svoboda (Russian: Свобода) is a rural locality (a selo) and the administrative centre of Svobodinsky Selsoviet, Kuyurgazinsky District, Bashkortostan, Russia. The population was 629 as of 2010. There are 8 streets.

== Geography ==
Svoboda is located 30 km west of Yermolayevo (the district's administrative centre) by road. Novotaymasovo is the nearest rural locality.
