= Kuznetsovsky, Kuyurgazinsky District, Republic of Bashkortostan =

Kuznetsovsky Кузнецовский
- Khutor
- Location within Bashkortostan Location within Russia
- Coordinates: 52°44′N 55°59′E
- Country: Russia
- Region: Bashkortostan
- District: Kuyurgazinsky District
- Time zone: UTC+5:00

Kuznetsovsky (Russian: Кузнецовский) is a rural locality (a khutor) in Krivle-Ilyushkinsky Selsoviet, Kuyurgazinsky District, Bashkortostan, Russia. The population was 10 as of 2010. There is 1 street.

== Geography ==
Kuznetsovsky is located 25 km east of Yermolayevo (the district's administrative centre) by road. Alexandrovsky is the nearest rural locality.
