= Yangi-Aul, Kuyurgazinsky District, Republic of Bashkortostan =

Yangi-Aul Янги-Аул
- Khutor
- Location within Bashkortostan Location within Russia
- Coordinates: 52°37′N 55°54′E
- Country: Russia
- Region: Bashkortostan
- District: Kuyurgazinsky District
- Time zone: UTC+5:00

Yangi-Aul (Russian: Янги-Аул; Bashkir: Яңауыл, Yañawıl) is a rural locality (a khutor) in Bakhmutsky Selsoviet, Kuyurgazinsky District, Bashkortostan, Russia. The population was 15 as of 2010. There is 1 street.

== Geography ==
Yangi-Aul is located 14 km southeast of Yermolayevo (the district's administrative centre) by road. Bakhmut is the nearest rural locality.
