= Balza, Kuyurgazinsky District, Republic of Bashkortostan =

Balza Бальза
- Village
- Location within Bashkortostan Location within Russia
- Coordinates: 52°45′N 55°55′E
- Country: Russia
- Region: Bashkortostan
- District: Kuyurgazinsky District
- Time zone: UTC+5:00

Balza (Russian: Бальза; Bashkir: Балъя, Balya) is a rural locality (a village) in Leninsky Selsoviet, Kuyurgazinsky District, Bashkortostan, Russia. The population was 142 as of 2010. There are 5 streets.

== Geography ==
Balza is located 14 km northeast of Yermolayevo (the district's administrative centre) by road. Alexandrovsky is the nearest rural locality.
