= Get Nervous =

Studio album by Pat Benatar
- Released: October 29, 1982
- Recorded: 1982
- Studio: MCA Whitney Studios in Glendale, California
- Genres: Rock, hard rock
- Length: 39:07
- Label: Chrysalis
- Producers: Neil Giraldo, Peter Coleman

Pat Benatar chronology
Precious Time (1981)	Get Nervous (1982)	Live from Earth (1983)

Singles from Get Nervous
- 1. "Shadows of the Night" Released: September 21, 1982; 2. "Little Too Late" Released: January 19, 1983; 3. "Looking for a Stranger" Released: April 23, 1983; 4. "Anxiety (Get Nervous)" Released: July 1983 (Europe only)

Professional ratings
Review scores
Source	Rating
AllMusic	4/5 stars
Rolling Stone	4/5 stars

Get Nervous is the fourth studio album by American rock singer Pat Benatar, released in October 1982. It debuted on the Billboard 200 album chart the week ending November 20 and peaked at No. 4, staying on the charts for 46 weeks.

Three songs from the album were released as singles: "Shadows of the Night", "Little Too Late", and "Looking for a Stranger" all reached the US Top 40. In 1983, "Shadows of the Night" garnered Benatar her third Grammy Award for Best Female Rock Vocal Performance.

This is the first Pat Benatar album to feature Charlie Giordano on keyboards, as guitarist Scott St. Clair Sheets left after Precious Time was released.

== Track listing ==
Side one
No.	Title	Writer(s)	Length
1.	"Shadows of the Night"	David Leigh Byron	4:20
2.	"Looking for a Stranger"	Franne Golde, Peter McIan	3:24
3.	"Anxiety (Get Nervous)"	Neil Giraldo, Billy Steinberg	3:42
4.	"Fight It Out"	Giraldo, Steinberg	3:56
5.	"The Victim"	Giraldo, Steinberg	4:43

Side two
No.	Title	Writer(s)	Length
6.	"Little Too Late"	Alex Call	4:06
7.	"I'll Do It"	Giraldo, Pat Benatar	4:09
8.	"I Want Out"	Giraldo, Steinberg	3:43
9.	"Tell It to Her"	Roger Bruno, Ellen Schwartz	3:44
10.	"Silent Partner"	Giraldo, Myron Grombacher	3:45

== Personnel ==
=== Musicians ===
- Pat Benatar – lead vocals
- Neil Giraldo – guitars, backing vocals, producer
- Charlie Giordano – keyboards
- Roger Capps – bass, backing vocals
- Myron Grombacher – drums

=== Production ===
- Peter Coleman – producer
- Dave Hernandez – assistant engineer
- Steve Hall – mastering

== Charts ==
=== Weekly charts ===
Weekly chart performance for Get Nervous
Chart (1982–1983)	Peak position
Australian Albums (Kent Music Report)	15
Canada Top Albums/CDs (RPM)	16
Japanese Albums (Oricon)	48
New Zealand Albums (RMNZ)	15
Swedish Albums (Sverigetopplistan)	18
UK Albums (Official Charts)	73
US Billboard 200	4
US Rock Albums (Billboard)	3

=== Year-end charts ===
Year-end chart performance for Get Nervous
Chart (1983)	Position
Canada Top Albums/CDs (RPM)	87
US Billboard 200	16

== Certifications ==
Region	Certification	Certified units/sales
Australia (ARIA)	Gold	20,000^{^}
Canada (Music Canada)	Platinum	100,000^{^}
France (SNEP)	Gold	100,000^{*}
New Zealand (RMNZ)	Gold	7,500^{^}
United States (RIAA)	Platinum	1,000,000^{^}
^{*} Sales figures based on certification alone.^{^} Shipments figures based on certification alone.

== In popular culture ==
- Alvin and the Chipmunks covered "Anxiety (Get Nervous)" for their 1985 Alvin and the Chipmunks episode "Court Action."
- Disney Channel-star Ashley Tisdale recorded a version "Shadows of the Night" for the film Picture This (2008).
- R&B vocalist Mary J. Blige sings "Shadows of the Night" in the film Rock of Ages of 2012.

== See also ==
- "No Reins" lawsuit
