= Yazlav =

Yazlav Язлав
- Village
- Location within Bashkortostan Location within Russia
- Coordinates: 52°31′N 55°41′E
- Country: Russia
- Region: Bashkortostan
- District: Kuyurgazinsky District
- Time zone: UTC+5:00

Yazlav (Russian: Язлав; Bashkir: Яҙлау, Yaźlaw) is a rural locality (a village) in Yakshimbetovsky Selsoviet, Kuyurgazinsky District, Bashkortostan, Russia. The population was 163 as of 2010. There are 2 streets.

== Geography ==
Yazlav is located 28 km southwest of Yermolayevo (the district's administrative centre) by road. Yakshimbetovo is the nearest rural locality.
