= Kholodny Klyuch =

Kholodny Klyuch Холодный Ключ
- Village
- Location within Bashkortostan Location within Russia
- Coordinates: 52°44′N 55°37′E
- Country: Russia
- Region: Bashkortostan
- District: Kuyurgazinsky District
- Time zone: UTC+5:00

Kholodny Klyuch (Russian: Холодный Ключ) is a rural locality (a village) in Shabagishsky Selsoviet, Kuyurgazinsky District, Bashkortostan, Russia. The population was 317 as of 2010. There are 6 streets.

== Geography ==
Kholodny Klyuch is located 16 km northwest of Yermolayevo (the district's administrative centre) by road. Mutal is the nearest rural locality.
