= Krivle-Ilyushkino =

Krivle-Ilyushkino Кривле-Илюшкино
- Selo
- Location within Bashkortostan Location within Russia
- Coordinates: 52°47′N 55°44′E
- Country: Russia
- Region: Bashkortostan
- District: Kuyurgazinsky District
- Time zone: UTC+5:00

Krivle-Ilyushkino (Russian: Кривле-Илюшкино; Bashkir: Керәүле-Илюшкин, Keräwle-İlyuşkin) is a rural locality (a selo) and the administrative centre of Krivle-Ilyushkinsky Selsoviet, Kuyurgazinsky District, Bashkortostan, Russia. The population was 678 as of 2010. There are 4 streets.

== Geography ==
Krivle-Ilyushkino is located 21 km east of Yermolayevo (the district's administrative centre) by road. Novotroitskaya is the nearest rural locality.
