= Bugulchan =

Bugulchan Бугульчан
- Selo
- Location within Bashkortostan Location within Russia
- Coordinates: 52°50′N 55°57′E
- Country: Russia
- Region: Bashkortostan
- District: Kuyurgazinsky District
- Time zone: UTC+5:00

Bugulchan (Russian: Бугульчан; Bashkir: Бөгөлсән, Bögölsän) is a rural locality (a selo) and the administrative centre of Leninsky Selsoviet, Kuyurgazinsky District, Bashkortostan, Russia. The population was 582 as of 2010. There are 11 streets.

== Geography ==
Bugulchan is located 25 km northeast of Yermolayevo (the district's administrative centre) by road. Pchelka is the nearest rural locality.
