= Timerbayevo =

Timerbayevo Тимербаево
- Village
- Location within Bashkortostan Location within Russia
- Coordinates: 52°40′N 55°20′E
- Country: Russia
- Region: Bashkortostan
- District: Kuyurgazinsky District
- Time zone: UTC+5:00

Timerbayevo (Russian: Тимербаево; Bashkir: Тимербай, Timerbay) is a rural locality (a village) in Svobodinsky Selsoviet, Kuyurgazinsky District, Bashkortostan, Russia. The population was 298 as of the 2010 census. There are three streets in village.

== Geography ==
Timerbayevo is located 45 km west of Yermolayevo (the district's administrative centre) by road. Kinya-Abyz is the nearest rural locality.
