= Kunakbayevo =

Kunakbayevo Кунакбаево
- Village
- Location within Bashkortostan Location within Russia
- Coordinates: 52°35′N 55°45′E
- Country: Russia
- Region: Bashkortostan
- District: Kuyurgazinsky District
- Time zone: UTC+5:00

Kunakbayevo (Russian: Кунакбаево; Bashkir: Ҡунаҡбай, Qunaqbay) is a rural locality (a village) in Yermolayevsky Selsoviet, Kuyurgazinsky District, Bashkortostan, Russia. The population was 108 as of 2010. There are 6 streets.

== Geography ==
Kunakbayevo is located 18 km south of Yermolayevo (the district's administrative centre) by road. Molokanovo is the nearest rural locality.
