= Raznomoyka =

Raznomoyka Разномойка
- Khutor
- Location within Bashkortostan Location within Russia
- Coordinates: 52°35′N 55°32′E
- Country: Russia
- Region: Bashkortostan
- District: Kuyurgazinsky District
- Time zone: UTC+5:00

Raznomoyka (Russian: Разномойка) is a rural locality (a khutor) in Yakshimbetovsky Selsoviet, Kuyurgazinsky District, Bashkortostan, Russia. The population was 13 as of 2010. There is 1 street.

== Geography ==
Raznomoyka is located 32 km southwest of Yermolayevo (the district's administrative centre) by road. Yangi-Yul is the nearest rural locality.
