= Nizhneye Babalarovo =

Nizhneye Babalarovo Нижнее Бабаларово
- Selo
- Location within Bashkortostan Location within Russia
- Coordinates: 52°24′N 55°31′E
- Country: Russia
- Region: Bashkortostan
- District: Kuyurgazinsky District
- Time zone: UTC+5:00

Nizhneye Babalarovo (Russian: Нижнее Бабаларово; Bashkir: Түбәнге Баба, Tübänge Baba) is a rural locality (a selo) in Yakshimbetovsky Selsoviet, Kuyurgazinsky District, Bashkortostan, Russia. The population was 230 as of 2010. There are 5 streets.

== Geography ==
Nizhneye Babalarovo is located 45 km southwest of Yermolayevo (the district's administrative centre) by road. Oktyabrskoye is the nearest rural locality.
