= Verkhneye Babalarovo =

Verkhneye Babalarovo Верхнее Бабаларово
- Selo
- Location within Bashkortostan Location within Russia
- Coordinates: 52°30′N 55°33′E
- Country: Russia
- Region: Bashkortostan
- District: Kuyurgazinsky District
- Time zone: UTC+5:00

Verkhneye Babalarovo (Russian: Верхнее Бабаларово; Bashkir: Үрге Баба, Ürge Baba) is a rural locality (a selo) in Yakshimbetovsky Selsoviet, Kuyurgazinsky District, Bashkortostan, Russia. The population was 137 as of 2010. There are 3 streets.

== Geography ==
Verkhneye Babalarovo is located 33 km southwest of Yermolayevo (the district's administrative centre) by road. Kuyurgazy is the nearest rural locality.
