= Novomusino =

Novomusino Новомусино
- Selo
- Location within Bashkortostan Location within Russia
- Coordinates: 52°50′N 55°40′E
- Country: Russia
- Region: Bashkortostan
- District: Kuyurgazinsky District
- Time zone: UTC+5:00

Novomusino (Russian: Новомусино; Bashkir: Яңы Муса, Yañı Musa) is a rural locality (a selo) in Ilkineyevsky Selsoviet, Kuyurgazinsky District, Bashkortostan, Russia. The population was 305 as of 2010. There are 7 streets.

== Geography ==
Novomusino is located 28 km northwest of Yermolayevo (the district's administrative centre) by road. Malomusino is the nearest rural locality.
