= Aksarovo =

Aksarovo Аксарово
- Village
- Location within Bashkortostan Location within Russia
- Coordinates: 52°29′N 55°49′E
- Country: Russia
- Region: Bashkortostan
- District: Kuyurgazinsky District
- Time zone: UTC+5:00

Aksarovo (Russian: Аксарово; Bashkir: Аҡһары, Aqharı) is a rural locality (a village) in Muraptalovsky Selsoviet, Kuyurgazinsky District, Bashkortostan, Russia. The population was 321 as of 2010. There are 5 streets.

== Geography ==
Aksarovo is located 29 km south of Yermolayevo (the district's administrative centre) by road. Yushatyrka is the nearest rural locality.
