= Kanchura =

Kanchura Канчура
- Village
- Location within Bashkortostan Location within Russia
- Coordinates: 52°47′N 55°44′E
- Country: Russia
- Region: Bashkortostan
- District: Kuyurgazinsky District
- Time zone: UTC+5:00

Kanchura (Russian: Канчура; Bashkir: Ҡансыра, Qansıra) is a rural locality (a village) in Shabagishsky Selsoviet, Kuyurgazinsky District, Bashkortostan, Russia. The population was 185 as of 2010. There are 4 streets.

== Geography ==
Kanchura is located 15 km northwest of Yermolayevo (the district's administrative centre) by road. Kumertau is the nearest rural locality.
