= Zyak-Ishmetovo =

Zyak-Ishmetovo Зяк-Ишметово
- Selo
- Location within Bashkortostan Location within Russia
- Coordinates: 52°52′N 55°25′E
- Country: Russia
- Region: Bashkortostan
- District: Kuyurgazinsky District
- Time zone: UTC+5:00

Zyak-Ishmetovo (Russian: Зяк-Ишметово; Bashkir: Зәк-Ишмәт, Zäk-İşmät) is a rural locality (a selo) and the administrative centre of Zyak-Ishmetovsky Selsoviet, Kuyurgazinsky District, Bashkortostan, Russia. The population was 682 as of 2010. There are six streets.

== Geography ==
Zyak-Ishmetovo is located 45 km northwest of Yermolayevo (the district's administrative centre) by road. Maryevka is the nearest rural locality.
