= Novoyamashevo =

Novoyamashevo Новоямашево
- Village
- Location within Bashkortostan Location within Russia
- Coordinates: 52°43′N 56°03′E
- Country: Russia
- Region: Bashkortostan
- District: Kuyurgazinsky District
- Time zone: UTC+5:00

Novoyamashevo (Russian: Новоямашево; Bashkir: Яңы Ямаш, Yañı Yamaş) is a rural locality (a village) in Krivle-Ilyushkinsky Selsoviet, Kuyurgazinsky District, Bashkortostan, Russia. The population was 71 as of 2010. There are 2 streets.

== Geography ==
Novoyamashevo is located 23 km east of Yermolayevo (the district's administrative centre) by road. Znamenka is the nearest rural locality.
