= Tyukanovo 2-ye =

Tyukanovo 2-ye Тюканово 2-е
- Village
- Location within Bashkortostan Location within Russia
- Coordinates: 52°42′N 55°27′E
- Country: Russia
- Region: Bashkortostan
- District: Kuyurgazinsky District
- Time zone: UTC+5:00

Tyukanovo 2-ye (Russian: Тюканово 2-е; Bashkir: 2-се Төкән, 2-se Tökän) is a rural locality (a village) in Svobodinsky Selsoviet, Kuyurgazinsky District, Bashkortostan, Russia. The population was 439 as of 2010. There are 5 streets.

== Geography ==
Tyukanovo 2-ye is located 30 km west of Yermolayevo (the district's administrative centre) by road. Svoboda is the nearest rural locality.
