= Shabagish =

Shabagish Шабагиш
- Village
- Location within Bashkortostan Location within Russia
- Coordinates: 52°43′N 55°42′E
- Country: Russia
- Region: Bashkortostan
- District: Kuyurgazinsky District
- Time zone: UTC+5:00

Shabagish (Russian: Шабагиш; Bashkir: Шәбағыш, Şäbağış) is a rural locality (a village) in Shabagishsky Selsoviet, Kuyurgazinsky District, Bashkortostan, Russia. The population was 581 as of 2010. There are 4 streets.

== Geography ==
Shabagish is located 9 km northwest of Yermolayevo (the district's administrative centre) by road. Mayachny is the nearest rural locality.
