= Yamansarovo =

Yamansarovo Ямансарово
- Selo
- Location within Bashkortostan Location within Russia
- Coordinates: 52°34′N 56°00′E
- Country: Russia
- Region: Bashkortostan
- District: Kuyurgazinsky District
- Time zone: UTC+5:00

Yamansarovo (Russian: Ямансарово; Bashkir: Яманһары, Yamanharı) is a rural locality (a selo) in Bakhmutsky Selsoviet, Kuyurgazinsky District, Bashkortostan, Russia. The population was 232 as of 2010. There are 7 streets.

== Geography ==
Yamansarovo is located 22 km southeast of Yermolayevo (the district's administrative centre) by road. Samartsevo is the nearest rural locality.
