= Yegoryevka, Kuyurgazinsky District, Republic of Bashkortostan =

Yegoryevka Егорьевка
- Village
- Location within Bashkortostan Location within Russia
- Coordinates: 52°50′N 55°46′E
- Country: Russia
- Region: Bashkortostan
- District: Kuyurgazinsky District
- Time zone: UTC+5:00

Yegoryevka (Russian: Егорьевка) is a rural locality (a village) in Shabagishsky Selsoviet, Kuyurgazinsky District, Bashkortostan, Russia. The population was 25 as of 2010. There is 1 street.

== Geography ==
Yegoryevka is located 19 km north of Yermolayevo (the district's administrative centre) by road. Karagayka is the nearest rural locality.
