= Novoyadgarovskaya =

Novoyadgarovskaya Новоядгаровская
- Village
- Location within Bashkortostan Location within Russia
- Coordinates: 52°44′N 56°03′E
- Country: Russia
- Region: Bashkortostan
- District: Kuyurgazinsky District
- Time zone: UTC+5:00

Novoyadgarovskaya (Russian: Новоядгаровская; Bashkir: Яңы Йәҙгәр, Yañı Yäźgär) is a rural locality (a village) in Krivle-Ilyushkinsky Selsoviet, Kuyurgazinsky District, Bashkortostan, Russia. The population was 1 as of 2010. There is 1 street.

== Geography ==
Novoyadgarovskaya is located 26 km east of Yermolayevo (the district's administrative centre) by road. Znamenka is the nearest rural locality.
