= Savelyevka, Kuyurgazinsky District, Republic of Bashkortostan =

Savelyevka Савельевка
- Village
- Location within Bashkortostan Location within Russia
- Coordinates: 52°33′N 55°48′E
- Country: Russia
- Region: Bashkortostan
- District: Kuyurgazinsky District
- Time zone: UTC+5:00

Savelyevka (Russian: Савельевка) is a rural locality (a village) in Otradinsky Selsoviet, Kuyurgazinsky District, Bashkortostan, Russia. The population was 40 as of 2010. There are 2 streets.

== Geography ==
Savelyevka is located 23 km south of Yermolayevo (the district's administrative centre) by road. Staraya Otrada is the nearest rural locality.
