= Dedovsky =

Dedovsky Дедовский
- Khutor
- Location within Bashkortostan Location within Russia
- Coordinates: 52°37′N 55°42′E
- Country: Russia
- Region: Bashkortostan
- District: Kuyurgazinsky District
- Time zone: UTC+5:00

Dedovsky (Russian: Дедовский) is a rural locality (a khutor) in Yermolayevsky Selsoviet, Kuyurgazinsky District, Bashkortostan, Russia. The population was 8 as of 2010.

== Geography ==
Dedovsky is located 15 km southwest of Yermolayevo (the district's administrative centre) by road. Molokanovo is the nearest rural locality.
