= Staromuraptalovo =

Staromuraptalovo Старомурапталово
- Village
- Location within Bashkortostan Location within Russia
- Coordinates: 52°25′N 55°47′E
- Country: Russia
- Region: Bashkortostan
- District: Kuyurgazinsky District
- Time zone: UTC+5:00

Staromuraptalovo (Russian: Старомурапталово; Bashkir: Иҫке Мораптал, İśke Moraptal) is a rural locality (a village) in Muraptalovsky Selsoviet, Kuyurgazinsky District, Bashkortostan, Russia. The population was 380 as of 2010. There are 6 streets.

== Geography ==
Staromuraptalovo is located 36 km south of Yermolayevo (the district's administrative centre) by road. Novomuraptalovo is the nearest rural locality.
