= Surakayevo =

Surakayevo Суракаево
- Khutor
- Location within Bashkortostan Location within Russia
- Coordinates: 52°38′N 56°08′E
- Country: Russia
- Region: Bashkortostan
- District: Kuyurgazinsky District
- Time zone: UTC+5:00

Surakayevo (Russian: Суракаево; Bashkir: Сураҡай, Suraqay) is a rural locality (a khutor) in Krivle-Ilyushkinsky Selsoviet, Kuyurgazinsky District, Bashkortostan, Russia. The population was 5 as of 2010. There is 1 street.

== Geography ==
Surakayevo is located 32 km southeast of Yermolayevo (the district's administrative centre) by road. Kinzyabayevo is the nearest rural locality.
