= Gorny Klyuch =

Gorny Klyuch Горный Ключ
- Village
- Location within Bashkortostan Location within Russia
- Coordinates: 52°36′N 55°53′E
- Country: Russia
- Region: Bashkortostan
- District: Kuyurgazinsky District
- Time zone: UTC+5:00

Gorny Klyuch (Russian: Горный Ключ) is a rural locality (a village) in Bakhmutsky Selsoviet, Kuyurgazinsky District, Bashkortostan, Russia. The population was 113 as of 2010. There are 3 streets.

== Geography ==
Gorny Klyuch is located 17 km south of Yermolayevo (the district's administrative centre) by road. Yangi-Aul is the nearest rural locality.
