= Yakupovo, Kuyurgazinsky District, Republic of Bashkortostan =

Yakupovo Якупово
- Selo
- Location within Bashkortostan Location within Russia
- Coordinates: 52°37′N 55°33′E
- Country: Russia
- Region: Bashkortostan
- District: Kuyurgazinsky District
- Time zone: UTC+5:00

Yakupovo (Russian: Якупово; Bashkir: Яҡуп, Yaqup) is a rural locality (a selo) in Yakshimbetovsky Selsoviet, Kuyurgazinsky District, Bashkortostan, Russia. The population was 322 as of 2010. There are 5 streets.

== Geography ==
Yakupovo is located 24 km southwest of Yermolayevo (the district's administrative centre) by road. Abdulovo is the nearest rural locality.
