= Novokaltayevo =

Novokaltayevo Новокалтаево
- Village
- Location within Bashkortostan Location within Russia
- Coordinates: 52°24′N 55°38′E
- Country: Russia
- Region: Bashkortostan
- District: Kuyurgazinsky District
- Time zone: UTC+5:00

Novokaltayevo (Russian: Новокалтаево; Bashkir: Яңы Ҡалта, Yañı Qalta) is a rural locality (a village) in Muraptalovsky Selsoviet, Kuyurgazinsky District, Bashkortostan, Russia. The population was 118 as of 2010. There is 1 street.

== Geography ==
Novokaltayevo is located 48 km southwest of Yermolayevo (the district's administrative centre) by road. Krasny Mayak is the nearest rural locality.
