= Samartsevo =

Samartsevo Самарцево
- Village
- Location within Bashkortostan Location within Russia
- Coordinates: 52°33′N 55°57′E
- Country: Russia
- Region: Bashkortostan
- District: Kuyurgazinsky District
- Time zone: UTC+5:00

Samartsevo (Russian: Самарцево) is a rural locality (a village) in Otradinsky Selsoviet, Kuyurgazinsky District, Bashkortostan, Russia. The population was 1 as of 2010. There are 5 streets.

== Geography ==
Samartsevo is located 28 km southeast of Yermolayevo (the district's administrative centre) by road. Yamangulovo is the nearest rural locality.
