= Taymasovo =

Taymasovo Таймасово
- Selo
- Location within Bashkortostan Location within Russia
- Coordinates: 52°47′N 55°27′E
- Country: Russia
- Region: Bashkortostan
- District: Kuyurgazinsky District
- Time zone: UTC+5:00

Taymasovo (Russian: Таймасово; Bashkir: Таймаҫ, Taymaś) is a rural locality (a selo) in Taymasovsky Selsoviet, Kuyurgazinsky District, Bashkortostan, Russia. The population was 313 as of 2010. There are 3 streets.

== Geography ==
Taymasovo is located 36 km northwest of Yermolayevo (the district's administrative centre) by road. Novotaymasovo is the nearest rural locality.
