= Yakutovo =

Yakutovo Якутово
- Selo
- Location within Bashkortostan Location within Russia
- Coordinates: 52°25′N 55°45′E
- Country: Russia
- Region: Bashkortostan
- District: Kuyurgazinsky District
- Time zone: UTC+5:00

Yakutovo (Russian: Якутово; Bashkir: Яҡут, Yaqut) is a rural locality (a selo) in Muraptalovsky Selsoviet, Kuyurgazinsky District, Bashkortostan, Russia. The population was 343 as of 2010. There are 4 streets.

== Geography ==
Yakutovo is located 40 km south of Yermolayevo (the district's administrative centre) by road. Novomuraptalovo is the nearest rural locality.

== Paleontology ==
Fossil of temnospondyl Benthosuchus bashkiricus was found in the Lower Triassic (Lower Olenekian) deposits of Yakutovo.
