= Kuyurgazy =

Kuyurgazy Куюргазы
- Village
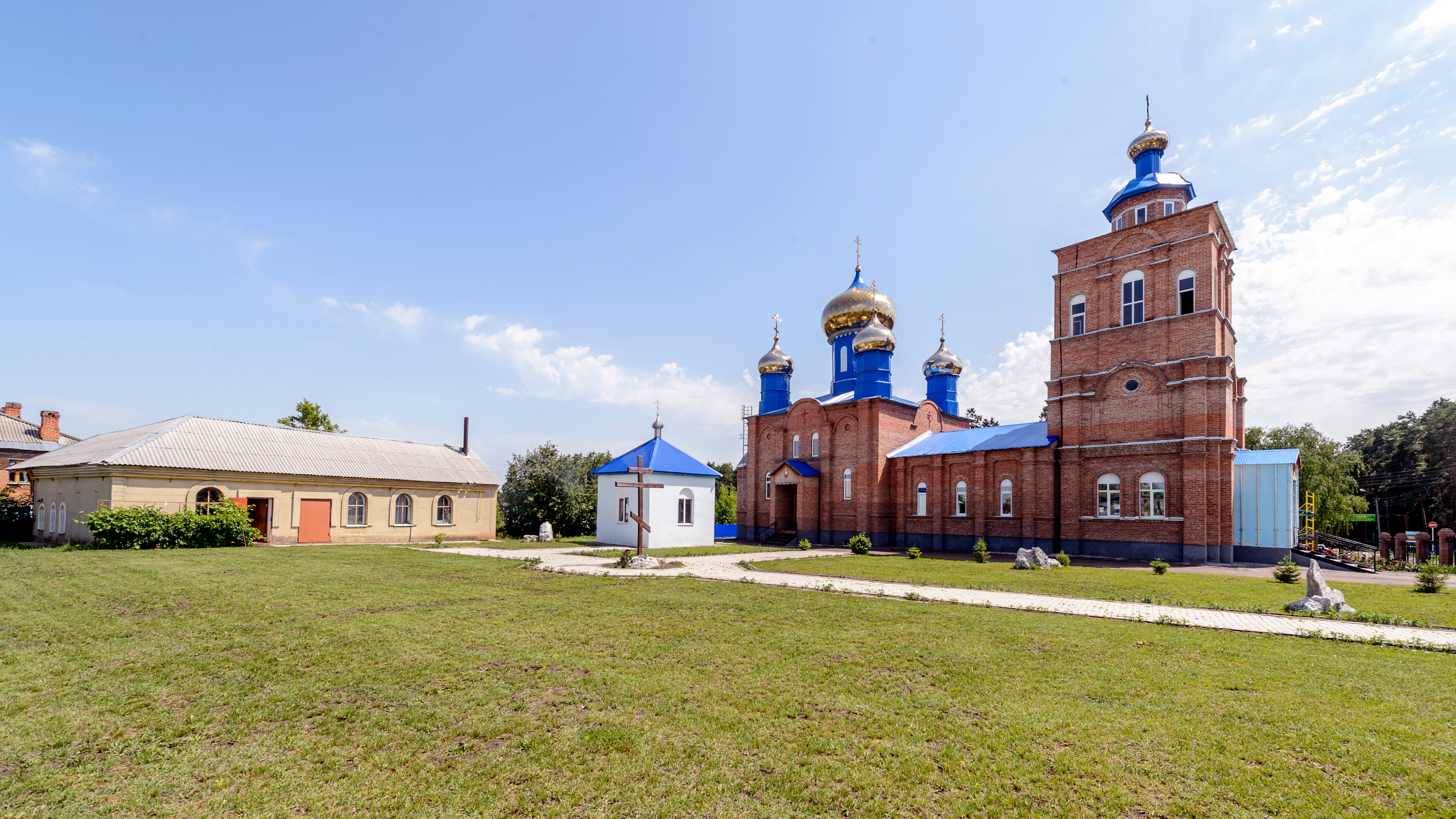
- St. Tikhon's Church, Kuyurgazy (2014)

- Location within Bashkortostan Location within Russia
- Coordinates: 52°29′N 55°33′E
- Country: Russia
- Region: Bashkortostan
- District: Kuyurgazinsky District
- Time zone: UTC+5:00

Kuyurgazy (Russian: Куюргазы; Bashkir: Көйөргәҙе, Köyörgäźe) is a rural locality (a village) in Yakshimbetovsky Selsoviet, Kuyurgazinsky District, Bashkortostan, Russia. The population was 189 as of 2010. There are 4 streets.

== Geography ==
Kuyurgazy is located 34 km southwest of Yermolayevo (the district's administrative centre) by road. Verkhneye Babalarovo is the nearest rural locality.
