= Aysuak =

Aysuak Айсуак
- Selo
- Location within Bashkortostan Location within Russia
- Coordinates: 52°41′N 55°47′E
- Country: Russia
- Region: Bashkortostan
- District: Kuyurgazinsky District
- Time zone: UTC+5:00

Aysuak (Russian: Айсуак; Bashkir: Айсыуаҡ, Aysıwaq) is a rural locality (a selo) in Yermolayevsky Selsoviet, Kuyurgazinsky District, Bashkortostan, Russia. The population was 1,123 as of 2010. There are 13 streets.

== Geography ==
Aysuak is located 3 km southwest of Yermolayevo (the district's administrative centre) by road. Yermolayevo is the nearest rural locality.
