= Krasny Vostok, Kuyurgazinsky District, Republic of Bashkortostan =

Krasny Vostok Красный Восток
- Village
- Location within Bashkortostan Location within Russia
- Coordinates: 52°42′N 55°53′E
- Country: Russia
- Region: Bashkortostan
- District: Kuyurgazinsky District
- Time zone: UTC+5:00

Krasny Vostok (Russian: Красный Восток) is a rural locality (a village) in Bakhmutsky Selsoviet, Kuyurgazinsky District, Bashkortostan, Russia. The population was 66 as of 2010. There is 1 street.

== Geography ==
Krasny Vostok is located 12 km east of Yermolayevo (the district's administrative centre) by road. Pokrovka is the nearest rural locality.
