= Yumaguzino, Kuyurgazinsky District, Republic of Bashkortostan =

Yumaguzino Юмагузино
- Village
- Location within Bashkortostan Location within Russia
- Coordinates: 52°54′N 55°50′E
- Country: Russia
- Region: Bashkortostan
- District: Kuyurgazinsky District
- Time zone: UTC+5:00

Yumaguzino (Russian: Юмагузино; Bashkir: Йомағужа, Yomağuja) is a rural locality (a village) in Ilkineyevsky Selsoviet, Kuyurgazinsky District, Bashkortostan, Russia. The population was 155 as of 2010. There are 3 streets.

== Geography ==
Yumaguzino is located 33 km north of Yermolayevo (the district's administrative centre) by road. Rassvet is the nearest rural locality.
