= Ilkineyevo =

Ilkineyevo Илькинеево
- Village
- Location within Bashkortostan Location within Russia
- Coordinates: 52°51′N 55°46′E
- Country: Russia
- Region: Bashkortostan
- District: Kuyurgazinsky District
- Time zone: UTC+5:00

Ilkineyevo (Russian: Илькинеево; Bashkir: Илкәнәй, İlkänäy) is a rural locality (a village) and the administrative centre of Ilkineyevsky Selsoviet, Kuyurgazinsky District, Bashkortostan, Russia. The population was 327 as of 2010. There are 4 streets.

== Geography ==
Ilkineyevo is located 23 km north of Yermolayevo (the district's administrative centre) by road. Malomusino is the nearest rural locality.
