= Novaya Otrada =

Novaya Otrada Новая Отрада
- Village
- Location within Bashkortostan Location within Russia
- Coordinates: 52°38′N 55°50′E
- Country: Russia
- Region: Bashkortostan
- District: Kuyurgazinsky District
- Time zone: UTC+5:00

Novaya Otrada (Russian: Новая Отрада) is a rural locality (a village) in Otradinsky Selsoviet, Kuyurgazinsky District, Bashkortostan, Russia. The population was 129 as of 2010. There are 2 streets.

== Geography ==
Novaya Otrada is located 11 km south of Yermolayevo (the district's administrative centre) by road. Otrada Bashkirskaya is the nearest rural locality.
