= Yushatyrka =

Yushatyrka Юшатырка
- Village
- Location within Bashkortostan Location within Russia
- Coordinates: 52°29′N 55°48′E
- Country: Russia
- Region: Bashkortostan
- District: Kuyurgazinsky District
- Time zone: UTC+5:00

Yushatyrka (Russian: Юшатырка; Bashkir: Юшатыр, Yuşatır) is a rural locality (a village) in Muraptalovsky Selsoviet, Kuyurgazinsky District, Bashkortostan, Russia. The population was 222 as of 2010. There are 4 streets.

== Geography ==
Yushatyrka is located 30 km south of Yermolayevo (the district's administrative centre) by road. Aksarovo is the nearest rural locality.
