= Novoallaberdino =

Novoallaberdino Новоаллабердино
- Village
- Location within Bashkortostan Location within Russia
- Coordinates: 52°23′N 55°51′E
- Country: Russia
- Region: Bashkortostan
- District: Kuyurgazinsky District
- Time zone: UTC+5:00

Novoallaberdino (Russian: Новоаллабердино; Bashkir: Яңы Аллабирҙе, Yañı Allabirźe) is a rural locality (a village) in Muraptalovsky Selsoviet, Kuyurgazinsky District, Bashkortostan, Russia. The population was 19 as of 2010. There is 1 street.

== Geography ==
Novoallaberdino is located 44 km south of Yermolayevo (the district's administrative centre) by road. Kopyly is the nearest rural locality.
