= Mambetkulovo =

Mambetkulovo Мамбеткулово
- Village
- Location within Bashkortostan Location within Russia
- Coordinates: 52°52′N 55°58′E
- Country: Russia
- Region: Bashkortostan
- District: Kuyurgazinsky District
- Time zone: UTC+5:00

Mambetkulovo (Russian: Мамбеткулово; Bashkir: Мәмбәтҡол, Mämbätqol) is a rural locality (a village) in Leninsky Selsoviet, Kuyurgazinsky District, Bashkortostan, Russia. The population was 175 as of 2010. There are 3 streets.

== Geography ==
Mambetkulovo is located 35 km northeast of Yermolayevo (the district's administrative centre) by road. Pchelka is the nearest rural locality.
