= Pchyolka, Republic of Bashkortostan =

Pchyolka Пчёлка
- Village
- Location within Bashkortostan Location within Russia
- Coordinates: 52°51′N 55°57′E
- Country: Russia
- Region: Bashkortostan
- District: Kuyurgazinsky District
- Time zone: UTC+5:00

Pchyolka (Russian: Пчёлка) is a rural locality (a village) in Leninsky Selsoviet, Kuyurgazinsky District, Bashkortostan, Russia. The population was 2 as of 2010. There are 5 streets.

== Geography ==
Pchyolka is located 33 km northeast of Yermolayevo (the district's administrative centre) by road. Bugulchan is the nearest rural locality.
