= Shadows of the Night =

1980 song composed by D. L. Byron

- Standard picture sleeve

Single by Pat Benatar

from the album Get Nervous
- B-side: "The Victim"
- Released: September 18, 1982
- Recorded: June 18, 1982
- Studio: MCA Whitney Studios (Burbank, CA)
- Genre: Hard rock, synth rock
- Length: 4:20 (album version); 3:40 (single edit)
- Label: Chrysalis
- Songwriter: David Leigh Byron
- Producers: Peter Coleman, Neil Giraldo

Pat Benatar singles chronology
"It's A Tuff Life" (1981)	"Shadows of the Night" (1982)	"Anxiety (Get Nervous)" (1982)

Music video
- "Shadows of the Night" on YouTube

"Shadows of the Night" is a song composed by D.L. Byron explicitly for the 1980 film Times Square, which tells the story of two young runaways in New York City. The song did not make it into the movie and Byron's own record label rejected it, claiming the song "wasn't commercial enough."

It was released as a single by Helen Schneider in 1981 as well as on her album Schneider with the Kick. According to Byron, Schneider's version went 5× platinum in Germany and the Benelux countries. This successful song is not mentioned in her own biography. Another version with slightly different lyrics was released by Rachel Sweet on her album ...And Then He Kissed Me in 1981.

The most famous version was then released in September 1982 by American rock singer Pat Benatar, as the lead single from her fourth studio album Get Nervous. Benatar's recording reached number 3 on the US Mainstream Rock Tracks chart, the Top 15 on the US Hot 100 and in Canada, and the Top 30 in Australia. "Shadows of the Night" garnered Benatar her third Grammy Award for Best Female Rock Vocal Performance in 1983. The lyrics of Benatar's version differ slightly from both previous versions.

== Music video ==
Benatar's music video for the song centers around Benatar as a riveter dreaming about being a flying ace who fights in World War II. It features Judge Reinhold as a pilot and Bill Paxton as a Wehrmacht Unteroffizier. Benatar's T-6 Texan aircraft is named Midnight Angel, a phrase also used in the song itself with a different meaning ("And now the hands of time are standin' still/Midnight angel, won't you say you will"). Due to the Nazi imagery present, the video was banned in Germany.

Helen Schneider's version has a spaceman and a goat.

== Chart performance ==
Chart (1982–83)	Peak position
Australia (Kent Music Report)	29
Canada Top Singles (RPM)	12
New Zealand (Recorded Music NZ)	32
UK Singles (Official Charts)	83
US Billboard Hot 100	13
US Mainstream Rock (Billboard)	3

Chart (1985)	Peak position
UK Singles (Official Charts)	50

== Cover versions ==
There have been several cover versions of the song over the years:

- In 1983, the Rachel Sweet version was covered by singer-songwriter Randy VanWarmer on his album The Things That You Dream.
- In 2005, the song was included as a musical number medley with the Quarterflash song "Harden My Heart" in the jukebox musical Rock of Ages.
- In the 2012 film adaptation of Rock of Ages, the song is performed by Mary J. Blige.
- In 2008, the song was covered by Ashley Tisdale for the soundtrack of the TV film Picture This. The same year, another cover by Paul Layton was included on the soundtrack of the independent zombie comedy movie Dance of the Dead.
- In 2022, Alison Pill sang a jazz cover of the song in Star Trek: Picard as the character Agnes Jurati.
- In 2024, Creeper included a cover of the song on an expanded, special edition of their 2023 album Sanguivore.

== Sampling ==
In 1995, the melody of the chorus was sampled in the DJ Miko Eurodance song "Lovely Lullaby", and again in 2014 in the Demi Lovato song "Really Don't Care".

== See also ==
- 1982 in music
