= Yakshimbetovo, Kuyurgazinsky District, Republic of Bashkortostan =

Yakshimbetovo Якшимбетово
- Selo
- Location within Bashkortostan Location within Russia
- Coordinates: 52°33′N 55°34′E
- Country: Russia
- Region: Bashkortostan
- District: Kuyurgazinsky District
- Time zone: UTC+5:00

Yakshimbetovo (Russian: Якшимбетово; Bashkir: Яҡшымбәт, Yaqşımbät) is a rural locality (a selo) and the administrative centre of Yakshimbetovsky Selsoviet, Kuyurgazinsky District, Bashkortostan, Russia. The population was 835 as of 2010. There are 9 streets.

== Geography ==
Yakshimbetovo is located 27 km southwest of Yermolayevo (the district's administrative centre) by road. Yangi-Yul is the nearest rural locality.
