= Arslano-Amekachevo =

Arslano-Amekachevo Арслано-Амекачево
- Village
- Location within Bashkortostan Location within Russia
- Coordinates: 52°39′N 56°05′E
- Country: Russia
- Region: Bashkortostan
- District: Kuyurgazinsky District
- Time zone: UTC+5:00

Arslano-Amekachevo (Russian: Арслано-Амекачево; Bashkir: Арыҫлан-Әмәкәс, Arıślan-Ämäkäs) is a rural locality (a village) in Krivle-Ilyushkinsky Selsoviet, Kuyurgazinsky District, Bashkortostan, Russia. The population was 159 as of 2010. There are 5 streets.

== Geography ==
Arslano-Amekachevo is located 27 km southeast of Yermolayevo (the district's administrative centre) by road. Pavlovka is the nearest rural locality.
