= Molokanovo =

Molokanovo Молоканово
- Selo
- Location within Bashkortostan Location within Russia
- Coordinates: 52°37′N 55°42′E
- Country: Russia
- Region: Bashkortostan
- District: Kuyurgazinsky District
- Time zone: UTC+5:00

Molokanovo (Russian: Молоканово) is a rural locality (a selo) in Yermolayevsky Selsoviet, Kuyurgazinsky District, Bashkortostan, Russia. The population was 338 as of 2010. There are 6 streets.

== Geography ==
Molokanovo is located 14 km southwest of Yermolayevo (the district's administrative centre) by road. Dedovsky is the nearest rural locality.
