= Novotaymasovo =

Novotaymasovo Новотаймасово
- Selo
- Location within Bashkortostan Location within Russia
- Coordinates: 52°47′N 55°27′E
- Country: Russia
- Region: Bashkortostan
- District: Kuyurgazinsky District
- Time zone: UTC+5:00

Novotaymasovo (Russian: Новотаймасово; Bashkir: Яңы Таймаҫ, Yañı Taymaś) is a rural locality (a selo) in Taymasovsky Selsoviet, Kuyurgazinsky District, Bashkortostan, Russia. The population was 579 as of 2010. There are 5 streets.

== Geography ==
Novotaymasovo is located 35 km northwest of Yermolayevo (the district's administrative centre) by road. Taymasovo is the nearest rural locality.
