= Kyzyl-Mayak =

Kyzyl-Mayak Кызыл-Маяк
- Village
- Location within Bashkortostan Location within Russia
- Coordinates: 52°24′N 55°42′E
- Country: Russia
- Region: Bashkortostan
- District: Kuyurgazinsky District
- Time zone: UTC+5:00

Kyzyl-Mayak (Russian: Кызыл-Маяк; Bashkir: Ҡыҙыл Маяк, Qıźıl Mayak) is a rural locality (a village) in Muraptalovsky Selsoviet, Kuyurgazinsky District, Bashkortostan, Russia. The population was 40 as of 2010. There is 1 street.

== Geography ==
Kyzyl-Mayak is located 43 km south of Yermolayevo (the district's administrative centre) by road. Krasny Mayak is the nearest rural locality.
