= Kutluyulovo =

Kutluyulovo Кутлуюлово
- Selo
- Location within Bashkortostan Location within Russia
- Coordinates: 52°31′N 55°32′E
- Country: Russia
- Region: Bashkortostan
- District: Kuyurgazinsky District
- Time zone: UTC+5:00

Kutluyulovo (Russian: Кутлуюлово; Bashkir: Ҡотлоюл, Qotloyul) is a rural locality (a selo) in Yakshimbetovsky Selsoviet, Kuyurgazinsky District, Bashkortostan, Russia. The population was 277 as of 2010. There are 4 streets.

== Geography ==
Kutluyulovo is located 35 km southwest of Yermolayevo (the district's administrative centre) by road. Verkhneye Babalarovo is the nearest rural locality.
