= Malomusino =

Malomusino Маломусино
- Village
- Location within Bashkortostan Location within Russia
- Coordinates: 52°50′N 55°44′E
- Country: Russia
- Region: Bashkortostan
- District: Kuyurgazinsky District
- Time zone: UTC+5:00

Malomusino (Russian: Маломусино; Bashkir: Бәләкәй Муса, Bäläkäy Musa) is a rural locality (a village) in Ilkineyevsky Selsoviet, Kuyurgazinsky District, Bashkortostan, Russia. The population was 97 as of 2010. There are 3 streets.

== Geography ==
Malomusino is located 22 km north of Yermolayevo (the district's administrative centre) by road. Karagay is the nearest rural locality.
