= Karayevo =

Karayevo Караево
- Village
- Location within Bashkortostan Location within Russia
- Coordinates: 52°37′N 55°28′E
- Country: Russia
- Region: Bashkortostan
- District: Kuyurgazinsky District
- Time zone: UTC+5:00

Karayevo (Russian: Караево; Bashkir: Ҡарай, Qaray) is a rural locality (a village) in Yakshimbetovsky Selsoviet, Kuyurgazinsky District, Bashkortostan, Russia. The population was 85 as of 2010. There is 1 street.

== Geography ==
Karayevo is located 32 km southwest of Yermolayevo (the district's administrative centre) by road. Abdulovo is the nearest rural locality.
