= Yangi-Yul, Kuyurgazinsky District, Republic of Bashkortostan =

Yangi-Yul Янги-Юл
- Village
- Location within Bashkortostan Location within Russia
- Coordinates: 52°34′N 55°32′E
- Country: Russia
- Region: Bashkortostan
- District: Kuyurgazinsky District
- Time zone: UTC+5:00

Yangi-Yul (Russian: Янги-Юл; Bashkir: Яңы Юл, Yañı Yul) is a rural locality (a village) in Yakshimbetovsky Selsoviet, Kuyurgazinsky District, Bashkortostan, Russia. The population was 128 as of 2010. There are 2 streets.

== Geography ==
Yangi-Yul is located 30 km southwest of Yermolayevo (the district's administrative centre) by road. Raznomoyka is the nearest rural locality.
