= Yamangulovo =

Yamangulovo Ямангулово
- Village
- Location within Bashkortostan Location within Russia
- Coordinates: 52°32′N 55°56′E
- Country: Russia
- Region: Bashkortostan
- District: Kuyurgazinsky District
- Time zone: UTC+5:00

Yamangulovo (Russian: Ямангулово; Bashkir: Яманғол, Yamanğol) is a rural locality (a village) in Otradinsky Selsoviet, Kuyurgazinsky District, Bashkortostan, Russia. The population was 237 as of 2010. There are 2 streets.

== Geography ==
Yamangulovo is located 27 km south of Yermolayevo (the district's administrative centre) by road. Samartsevo is the nearest rural locality.
