= (You Can Still) Rock in America =

Single by Night Ranger

from the album Midnight Madness
- Released: November 1983
- Recorded: 1983
- Genre: Glam metal
- Label: MCA Records
- Songwriters: Jack Blades; Brad Gillis

Night Ranger singles chronology
| "Sing Me Away" (1983) | "(You Can Still) Rock in America" (1983) | "Sister Christian" (1984) |

"(You Can Still) Rock in America" is a song written by Jack Blades and Brad Gillis, and the first single released from Night Ranger's 1983 album Midnight Madness. Former Deep Purple singer Glenn Hughes contributed backing vocals on the song.

== Background ==
Night Ranger was on tour in Springfield, Illinois with Sammy Hagar in 1983. Singer Jack Blades bought several music magazines in town on his day off, many of which proclaimed "rock is dead" in favor of new wave artists like Thompson Twins or the Cure. Blades refused to believe it, as his band and Sammy Hagar had played so many concerts on their tour with thousands of screaming fans who seemed to think rock and roll was still very much alive. He came up with the chorus first, and then wrote some verses based on what fans would tell him about the lengths they went to attend rock concerts. "So I just took this one girl's idea of what she was telling me, and I wrote that as a commentary on what I was seeing out there when everybody was saying rock was dead. And that ended up being sort of an anthem for Night Ranger, for sure," said Blades.

== Track listing ==
| No. | Title | Writer(s) | Length |
|---|---|---|---|
| 1. | "(You Can Still) Rock in America" | Blades, Gillis | 4:16 |
| 2. | "Let Him Run" | Blades, Keagy, Watson | 3:29 |
| Total length: | | | 7:45 |

== Personnel ==
Night Ranger

- Jack Blades – bass, lead vocals
- Alan Fitzgerald – keyboards
- Brad Gillis – guitars, vocals
- Kelly Keagy – drums, vocals
- Jeff Watson – guitars, vocals

Additional musicians

- Glenn Hughes – backing vocals on "(You Can Still) Rock in America"

== Charts ==
| Chart (1983) | Peak position |
|---|---|
| US Billboard Hot 100 | 51 |
| US Mainstream Rock (Billboard) | 15 |

== In popular culture ==
A re-recording of the song is downloadable content for Rock Band 2 and is a playable track on Guitar Hero: Warriors of Rock.

"(You Can Still) Rock in America" was the opening credits theme song for the television series Rock 'N' America.

A snippet plays during the series finale of The Drew Carey Show.
