= Sandin Wilson =

American bassist

- Born: Sandin Wilson; October 6, 1959 (age 66); Medford, Oregon
- Genres: Rock
- Instrument: Acoustic bass guitar
- Works: Fieldtrip; Sandin Wilson Group; Into my World
- Formerly of: Freeway, Calvin Walker band, The 3 Humans, Caryl Mack band, Quarterflash, Nu Shooz, Soul Vaccination, Linda Hornbuckle, METRO, Gino Vannelli's band

Sandin Wilson (born October 6, 1959, in Medford, Oregon) is a veteran bassist and vocalist from the Pacific Northwest.

== Early life and education ==
Orchestra was Wilson's first calling on the acoustic bass violin, with a trip to NYC with "America's Youth in Concert" in 1976, at age 16, to play Carnegie Hall, and 9 European countries.

After graduating from Medford Senior High in 1978, Wilson attended Mt. Hood Community College for a year.

In 1996–1997, Wilson attended Portland Community College, studying nursing practice to become a Certified Nursing Assistant.

== Career ==
With the group Freeway 12 from 1979 to 1984, Sandin Wilson recorded two albums, two singles, and a compilation, and he had 43 credits from 1981 through 2015. From 1989–2009, he was also a bassist and vocalist with Quarterflash.

In 2003, Sandin Wilson released his first solo CD, Into My World (Microfish Music), with bassist Jimmy Haslip, of the "Yellowjackets" fame, getting Executive producer credits, with Haslip contributing 2 tracks from his songwriting portfolio.

From 2005–2010, Sandin Wilson was a bassist and vocalist with the Gino Vannelli Band. His second solo project was recorded live to 2-track in October 2006 at Jimmy Maks Jazz club in Portland, Oregon. Entitled, "Sandin Wilson Group", a "Night on the Town" (2007, Microfish Music), it is a very live recording featuring stellar bass and vocal performances from Sandin and his 6 piece group.

Aside from his solo projects, the "Sandin Wilson Group" and "Sandin Wilson Trio", he also has toured with vocalist/songwriter Gino Vannelli. Sandin has recorded two DVDs with Gino Vannelli's band, one on the Orange lounge.com site and also a Live DVD while performing at the Java Jazz festival in Jakarta, Indonesia.

Sandin Wilson has recorded on over 120 CDs and has recorded on the album Girl In the Wind. He toured with the band Quarterflash, Nu Shooz and opened shows for people such as Kenny Loggins, Chaka Khan, Tower of Power, The Neville Brothers and Level 42. Sandin's gigs with Gino Vannelli have been in Jakarta, and at the "Java Jazz Festival", in Indonesia.

Wilson has lived in Monroe, Georgia, and he currently resides in Scappoose, Oregon.
