= Sandin 2-y =

Sandin 2-y Сандин 2-й
- Village
- Location within Bashkortostan Location within Russia
- Coordinates: 52°39′N 55°37′E
- Country: Russia
- Region: Bashkortostan
- District: Kuyurgazinsky District
- Time zone: UTC+5:00

Sandin 2-y (Russian: Сандин 2-й; Bashkir: 2-се Санйын, 2-se Sanyın) is a rural locality (a village) in Yermolayevsky Selsoviet, Kuyurgazinsky District, Bashkortostan, Russia. The population was 149 as of 2010. There are 3 streets.

== Geography ==
Sandin 2-y is located 14 km southwest of Yermolayevo (the district's administrative centre) by road. Sandin and Mayachny are the nearest rural localities.
