= Sandin, Kuyurgazinsky District, Republic of Bashkortostan =

Sandin Сандин
- Khutor
- Location within Bashkortostan Location within Russia
- Coordinates: 52°37′N 55°37′E
- Country: Russia
- Region: Bashkortostan
- District: Kuyurgazinsky District
- Time zone: UTC+5:00

Sandin (Russian: Сандин; Bashkir: Санйын, Sanyın) is a rural locality (a khutor) in Yermolayevsky Selsoviet, Kuyurgazinsky District, Bashkortostan, Russia. The population was 13 as of 2010. There is 1 street.

== Geography ==
Sandin is located 18 km southwest of Yermolayevo (the district's administrative centre) by road. Sandin 2-y is the nearest rural locality.
