= Midnight Madness (album) =

Studio album by Night Ranger
- Released: October 27, 1983
- Recorded: 1983
- Studio: Image Recording (Los Angeles)
- Genre: Hard rock
- Length: 38:56
- Label: MCA
- Producer: Pat Glasser

Night Ranger chronology
Dawn Patrol (1982)	Midnight Madness (1983)	7 Wishes (1985)

Singles from Midnight Madness
- 1. "(You Can Still) Rock in America" Released: November 1983; 2. "Sister Christian" Released: March 1984; 3. "When You Close Your Eyes" Released: July 1984

Professional ratings
Review scores
Source	Rating
AllMusic	4/5 stars
Classic Rock	Essential
Collector's Guide to Heavy Metal	7/10

Midnight Madness is the second studio album by American rock band Night Ranger, released in October 1983 by MCA Records. The album produced three charting singles and contains the band's best known hit, "Sister Christian". It remains their highest selling album at over a million copies sold in the US.

== Singles ==
The first single/video, "(You Can Still) Rock in America" peaked at number 51 in early 1984 on Billboard's Hot 100 chart and also reached number 15 on Billboard's Mainstream Rock Tracks chart. "Sister Christian" peaked at number 5 on Billboard's Hot 100 and was one of the most played videos of 1984. The song also has been featured in several films including Boogie Nights and Rock of Ages among others. "When You Close Your Eyes" was the third single/video and reached number 14 on Billboard's Hot 100 chart and number 7 on Billboard's Mainstream Rock Tracks Chart. The 1984 CD release contains a slightly different recording of the track. "Rumours in the Air" also charted on the Billboard Mainstream Rock chart peaking at number 26 in the spring of 1984.

== Track listing ==
Side one
No.	Title	Writer(s)	Length
1.	"(You Can Still) Rock in America"	Jack Blades, Brad Gillis	4:16
2.	"Rumours in the Air"	Blades	4:33
3.	"Why Does Love Have to Change"	Blades	3:49
4.	"Sister Christian"	Kelly Keagy	5:03

Side two
No.	Title	Writer(s)	Length
1.	"Touch of Madness"	Blades	5:01
2.	"Passion Play"	Blades	4:43
3.	"When You Close Your Eyes"	Blades, Alan Fitzgerald, Gillis	4:19
4.	"Chippin' Away"	Blades, Gillis	4:13
5.	"Let Him Run"	Blades, Keagy, Jeff Watson	3:29

== Personnel ==
Night Ranger

- Jack Blades – bass, lead vocals
- Kelly Keagy – drums, lead vocals
- Brad Gillis – guitars, vocals
- Jeff Watson – guitars
- Alan Fitzgerald – keyboards, vocals

Additional musicians

- Glenn Hughes – backing vocals on "(You Can Still) Rock in America"

Production

- Pat Glasser – producer
- John Van Nest – engineer
- Brian Gardner – mastering

== Charts ==
Chart (1983–84)	Peak position
Canada Top Albums/CDs (RPM)	24
German Albums (Offizielle Top 100)	58
US Billboard 200	15

== Certifications ==
Region	Certification	Certified units/sales
Canada (Music Canada)	Gold	50,000^{^}
Japan (RIAJ)	Gold	100,000^{^}
United States (RIAA)	Platinum	1,000,000^{^}
^{^} Shipments figures based on certification alone.
