= When You Close Your Eyes =

Single by Night Ranger

from the album Midnight Madness
- B-side: "Why Does Love Have to Change"
- Released: July 1984
- Genre: Rock; pop metal
- Length: 4:08
- Label: MCA
- Songwriters: Jack Blades; Alan Fitzgerald; Brad Gillis
- Producer: Pat Glasser

Night Ranger singles chronology
"Sister Christian" (1984)	"When You Close Your Eyes" (1984)	"Sentimental Street" (1985)

"When You Close Your Eyes" is a song by American rock band Night Ranger from their 1983 album Midnight Madness.

In the U.S., the single reached number 14 on the Billboard Hot 100 and number 7 on the Billboard Hot Mainstream Rock Tracks chart. Ultimate Classic Rock ranked "When You Close Your Eyes" at number five on their list of Top 10 Night Ranger Songs.

== Background ==
Singer Jack Blades sat at a piano in the recording studio and improvised some chords one day, and started spontaneously singing, "When you close your eyes, do you dream about me?" He showed it to Harry Maslin, co-owner of the studio, who was impressed and urged him to keep working on the song. Blades worked out the music with the rest of the band, but they were stuck on the lyrics, and it was distracting trying to write in Hollywood. So Blades flew to his parents' home in Scottsdale, Arizona, and sat by their pool for three days, writing lyrics to "When You Close Your Eyes" and a few other songs. Blades said,

It all kind of came to me, just about how you move on in your life. I thought about my old girlfriend, where we split up, and I wonder if she ever thinks about the past, and all these things you went through when you were growing up, and all these things you did when you were together, and your first love, and the first woman that I made love to. And then everybody moves on in their lives, and you just go in separate ways. And I always wondered, "When you close your eyes, do you think about me?"

== Music video ==
In the music video, scenes of the band performing are interspersed with a man's memories of his ex-girlfriend, and scenes showing her current situation, as a housewife with a husband being Carl the chimpanzee.

In addition, there is a slightly modified version of this video, which, among other differences, features the chimpanzee less prominently.

== Track listing ==
No.	Title	Writer(s)	Length
1.	"When You Close Your Eyes"	Blades, Fitzgerald, Gillis	4:19
2.	"Why Does Love Have To Change"	Blades	3:49
Total length:			8:08

== Personnel ==
- Jack Blades – bass, lead vocals (verses and chorus)
- Alan Fitzgerald – keyboards
- Brad Gillis – guitars, vocals
- Kelly Keagy – drums, lead vocals (b-sections)
- Jeff Watson – guitars, vocals

== Charts ==
=== Weekly charts ===
Chart (1984)	Peak position
Canada Top Singles (RPM)	41
US Billboard Hot 100	14
US Mainstream Rock (Billboard)	7

=== Year-end charts ===
Chart (1984)	Position
US Top Pop Singles (Billboard)	98
