= Don't Tell Me You Love Me =

Single by Night Ranger

from the album Dawn Patrol
- B-side: "Night Ranger"
- Released: December 1982
- Genre: Hard rock, arena rock
- Length: 4:19 (album version); 3:37 (radio edit)
- Label: Boardwalk, MCA
- Songwriter: Jack Blades
- Producer: Pat Glasser

Night Ranger singles chronology
"Don't Tell Me You Love Me" (1982)	"Sing Me Away" (1983)

Music video
- "Don't Tell Me You Love Me" on YouTube

"Don't Tell Me You Love Me" is a song by Night Ranger written by Jack Blades from their 1982 album, Dawn Patrol. It was released as a single in December 1982.

The song was re-recorded for the music video game Rock Band and was released as downloadable content.

== Background ==
Singer Jack Blades was thinking about a hypothetical relationship that is "fun and happy" until one person confesses they love the other, at which point tension begins. He wrote the chorus first, followed by a few verses. He did not think he had written enough lyrics, but his producer convinced him he had conveyed the message of the song sufficiently in those few words.

== Reception ==
In Kerrang!, Dee Snider said, "This isn't Ozzy Osbourne, but it isn't Toto either; it's right in-between. Powerful enough for the heavys and catchy enough for the straights. Brad hasn't lost his forcefulness. His lead work is brilliant."

== Music video ==
The song's music video that was played on MTV, which shows the band performing the song on rail tracks in front of an oncoming train, was directed by Daniel Halperin and produced by Paul Flattery. A live video for the song was released in 2016 to promote the live album 35 Years and a Night in Chicago.

== Track listing ==
7" single

Side A
No.	Title	Length
1.	"Don't Tell Me You Love Me"	4:20

Side B
No.	Title	Length
1.	"Night Ranger"	4:31

Radio edit single

Side A
No.	Title	Length
1.	"Don't Tell Me You Love Me" (radio edit)	3:37

Side B
No.	Title	Length
1.	"Night Ranger"	4:22

== Charts ==
Chart (1983)	Peak position
US Billboard Hot 100	40
US Mainstream Rock (Billboard)	4
Switzerland (Schweizer Hitparade)	9
