= Back into Blue =

Back Into Blue

Studio album by Quarterflash
- Released: 1985
- Studios: Studio Miraval, Correns, France
- Genre: Pop rock
- Length: 44:09
- Label: Geffen
- Producer: Steve Levine

Quarterflash chronology
Take Another Picture (1983)	Back Into Blue (1985)	Girl in the Wind (1991)

Singles from Back into Blue
- 1. "Talk to Me" Released: October 1985; 2. "Walking on Ice" Released: January 1986

Back into Blue is the third studio album by American pop rock band Quarterflash, released in 1985. It peaked at No. 150 on the U.S. charts. Two commercial singles were released from the album, "Talk to Me" and "Walking on Ice"—the former reached No. 83 on the American charts and was the group's last charting single, whereas the latter was released with a music video but failed to chart. The album sold around 250,000 copies.

== Critical reception ==
Professional ratings
Review scores
Source	Rating
AllMusic	2.5/5 stars

The Daily Breeze wrote that the album "is almost exclusively made up of slow and medium tempo snorers that show nothing in the way of invention or even catchy hooks." The San Diego Union-Tribune opined that "Quarterflash has sunken deeper into the muck and mire of middle-of-road, middle-class pop music... Although well produced, written and performed, Back into Blue still has the taste of white bread and whole milk."

== Track listing ==
All songs written by Marv Ross and Rindy Ross, except for where noted.

Side one

1. "Walking on Ice (Marv Ross) – 3:48
2. "Caught in the Rain" – 4:55
3. "Back into Blue" – 4:27
4. "Talk to Me" – 5:00
5. "I Want to Believe It's You" – 3:52

Side two

1. "Love Without a Net (You Keep Falling)" (M. Ross, Rindy Ross, Rich Gooch) – 4:09
2. "Come to Me" (M. Ross, R. Ross, Daniel Brandt, Brian David Willis)– 3:21
3. "Grace Under Fire" (M. Ross) – 5:26
4. "Just for You" – 4:59
5. "Welcome to the City" – 4:11

== Personnel ==
- Rindy Ross – vocals, saxophone
- Marv Ross – guitars
- Daniel Brandt – keyboards
- Rich Gooch – bass
- Brian David Willis – drums, percussion

== Charts ==
Chart (1985)	Peak position
US Billboard 200	150
