= Sandin (name) =

Sandin / Sandín
- Pronunciation: san-deen

Origin
- Meaning: ‘sand’ + -in, from Latin -in(i)us meaning ‘descendant of’.
- Region of origin: Sweden (Sandin); Spain (Sandín)

Other names
- Variant forms: "Sandino" "Sandinus", "Sendín",

Sandin is a surname of Swedish origin. Sandín also refers to the surname found in Spain and Latin America, particularly (Brazil, Mexico, Argentina and Uruguay). The distribution of Spanish births, are most common in Zamora with (33,73%) of people with the surname and it being their first Surname, Madrid (14,45%), Cáceres (9,99%) and Salamanca (8,23%).

== Sandin ==
=== Frequency and distribution ===
- Most prevalent in Sweden – 3,399 people.
- Highest density in Sweden – (frequency 1:2,897) 278th most common surname.

Sandin distribution - 2014
Country	Population	Rank	Ratio
Sweden	3,399	278	1:2,897
United States	1,287	26,245	1:281,631
Spain	856	5,046	1:54,617
Brazil	536	15,226	1:399,392
Mexico	473	6,304	1:262,423
Uruguay	370	1,040	1:9,275
Malaysia	344	5,997	1:85,739
Russia	294	45,386	1:490,214
Argentina	273	13,217	1:156,569

== Sandín ==
=== Frequency and distribution ===
- Most prevalent in Spain – 22 people.
- Highest density in Uruguay – 35,955th most common surname.

Sandín - 2014
Country	Population	Rank	Ratio
Spain	22	54,547	1:2,125,093
Mexico	6	53,861	1:20,687,701
Brazil	2	1,031,150	1:107,037,166
Uruguay	2	35,955	1:1,715,879

== People ==
- Åke Sandin, Swedish sprint canoer who competed in the late 1960s and early 1970s
- Daniel J. Sandin, American video and computer graphics artist/researcher.
- Emil Sandin, professional Swedish ice hockey player
- Erik Sandin, American drummer of the California punk band, NOFX
- Lennart Sandin (1919–1991), Swedish bobsledder who competed in the early 1950s
- Max Sandin (1889?–1967)), American anti-war activist
- Ramon Sandin, also known as Guy Sandin, (1970) was a Puerto Rican Olympic diver is now an actor.
- Rasmus Sandin, Swedish ice hockey player
- Sandin Wilson, American bassist and vocalist from the Pacific Northwest
