= Quarterflash (album) =

Studio album by Quarterflash
- Released: October 1981
- Recorded: 1981
- Genre: Rock
- Length: 40:38
- Label: Geffen
- Producer: John Boylan

Quarterflash chronology
Quarterflash (1981)	Take Another Picture (1983)

Singles from Quarterflash
- 1. "Harden My Heart" / "Don't Be Lonely" Released: 1981; 2. "Find Another Fool" / "Cruisin' with the Deuce" Released: 1981; 3. "Valerie" / "Try to Make It True" Released: 1981 (Europe); 4. "Right Kind of Love" / "You're Holding Me Back" Released: 1982

Professional ratings
Review scores
Source	Rating
AllMusic	4/5 stars

Quarterflash is the debut album of American rock band Quarterflash. It was released in 1981 on Geffen Records and features the single, "Harden My Heart", which reached No. 3 on the Billboard Hot 100 and No. 1 on the Billboard Album Rock Tracks chart. The follow-up single was "Find Another Fool", which reached No. 16 on the Hot 100. The album was certified platinum in the United States by the RIAA.

== Track listing ==
All songs written by Marv Ross except as noted. All lead vocals by Rindy Ross except where noted.

Side One
No.	Title	Writer(s)	Lead vocals	Length
1.	"Harden My Heart"			3:51
2.	"Find Another Fool"			4:32
3.	"Critical Times"	Charles	Charles	5:06
4.	"Valerie"			4:20
5.	"Try to Make It True"			3:38

Side Two
No.	Title	Lead vocals	Length
6.	"Right Kind of Love"		3:49
7.	"Cruisin' With the Deuce"	Charles	4:10
8.	"Love Should Be So Kind"		3:10
9.	"Williams Avenue"		7:57
Total length:			40:38

== Personnel ==
Quarterflash

- Rindy Ross – Vocals, saxophone
- Marv Ross – Guitars
- Jack Charles – Guitars, vocals
- Rick DiGiallonardo – Keyboards
- Rich Gooch – Bass
- Brian David Willis – Drums, percussion

=== Additional personnel ===
- Paulinho da Costa – Percussion
- Bruce Sweetman – Violin
- John Boylan – Additional vocals
- Timothy B. Schmit – Additional vocals
- Mike Porcaro – Bass on "Williams Avenue"

== Production ==
- John Boylan – Producer
- Paul Grupp – Engineer
- Phil Jamtaas – Assistant Engineer
- Erik Zobler – Assistant Engineer

== Charts ==
=== Weekly charts ===
Chart (1981-82)	Peak position
Australian Albums (Kent Music Report)	22
Canada Top Albums/CDs (RPM)	6
New Zealand Albums (RMNZ)	28
Norwegian Albums (VG-lista)	27
Swedish Albums (Sverigetopplistan)	25
US Billboard 200	8

=== Year-end charts ===
Chart (1982)	Peak position
U.S. Billboard 200	20

== Certifications ==
Region	Certification	Certified units/sales
Canada (Music Canada)	Platinum	100,000^{^}
United States (RIAA)	Platinum	1,000,000^{^}
^{^} Shipments figures based on certification alone.
