= Rock of Ages (2012 film) =

2012 American musical comedy film by Adam Shankman

- Theatrical release poster
- Directed by: Adam Shankman
- Screenplay by: Chris D'Arienzo; Allan Loeb; Justin Theroux
- Based on: Rock of Ages by Chris D'Arienzo
- Produced by: Jennifer Gibgot; Garrett Grant; Carl Levin; Tobey Maguire; Scott Prisand; Dan Shafer; Matt Weaver
- Starring: Julianne Hough; Diego Boneta; Russell Brand; Paul Giamatti; Catherine Zeta-Jones; Malin Åkerman; Mary J. Blige; Alec Baldwin; Tom Cruise
- Cinematography: Bojan Bazelli
- Edited by: Emma E. Hickox
- Music by: Adam Anders; Peer Åström
- Production companies: New Line Cinema; Offspring Entertainment; Corner Stone Entertainment; Material Pictures
- Distributed by: Warner Bros. Pictures
- Release date: June 15, 2012
- Running time: 123 minutes
- Country: United States
- Language: English
- Budget: $75 million
- Box office: $59.4 million

Rock of Ages is a 2012 American jukebox musical comedy film directed by Adam Shankman from a screenplay by Chris D'Arienzo, Allan Loeb, and Justin Theroux, based on the Broadway musical Rock of Ages by D'Arienzo. Produced by New Line Cinema and Corner Stone Entertainment in association with Offspring Entertainment and Material Pictures, the film stars Julianne Hough and Diego Boneta (in his film debut), leading an ensemble cast that includes Russell Brand, Alec Baldwin, Paul Giamatti, Catherine Zeta-Jones, Malin Åkerman, Mary J. Blige, Bryan Cranston and Tom Cruise. Like the stage musical, the film features the music of many 1980s rock artists including Def Leppard, Journey, Scorpions, Poison, Foreigner, Guns N' Roses, Pat Benatar, Joan Jett, Bon Jovi, Twisted Sister, Whitesnake, REO Speedwagon, and others.

After the success of the stage musical, the film rights were sold to Warner Bros. Pictures and New Line in early 2009. Shankman was confirmed as director in October, with D'Arienzo announced to be adapting his book into the screenplay, later joined by Loeb and Theroux. Originally scheduled to enter production in summer 2009 for a 2011 release, it eventually commenced production in May 2011, with Hough, Boneta, Cruise, Brand, Baldwin, Giamatti, Zeta-Jones, Blige, Cranston, Åkerman, and the rest of the cast already filled out.

Principal photography took place between May and August of that year, with locations including Miami, Hollywood, and Fort Lauderdale, Florida, as well as Los Angeles. Aside from the songs, the duo of Adam Anders and Peer Åström composed the film's incidental score.

Rock of Ages premiered at Grauman's Chinese Theatre in Los Angeles on June 8, 2012, and was released in the United States on June 15, by Warner Bros. Pictures. The film received mixed to negative critical reviews and was a box-office bomb, grossing only $59.4 million worldwide on a $75 million budget. While criticism was aimed at its script and the lack of faithfulness to its source material, Cruise's performance was praised, particularly for his performances of "Pour Some Sugar on Me" and "Wanted Dead or Alive". The related film soundtrack was also well-received, debuting at #1 on the Billboard Top Soundtracks chart.

== Plot ==
In 1987 Los Angeles, Sherrie Christian arrives from Oklahoma with dreams of becoming a singer. Sherrie's suitcase is stolen, and barback Drew Boley gets her a job as a waitress at the Bourbon Room after the previous waitress quits ("Sister Christian/Just Like Paradise/Nothin' But a Good Time").

Desperate to save the club from a tax debt, the club's owner Dennis Dupree and his right-hand man Lonny Barnett book Stacee Jaxx, a detached and self-indulgent rock star preparing for his final gig with his band Arsenal. Drew tells Sherrie his own dreams of becoming a rock star, but that he has stagefright ("Juke Box Hero/I Love Rock 'n' Roll"). Learning of Stacee's upcoming concert, Patricia Whitmore, the conservative wife of mayor Mike Whitmore, organizes a protest in front of the club ("Hit Me with Your Best Shot").

Drew and Sherrie have their first date at the Hollywood Sign ("Waiting for a Girl Like You"), where Drew reveals he is writing a song for Sherrie ("Don't Stop Believin'"). On the night of Arsenal's final show, Dennis learns the opening act has cancelled; Sherrie convinces him to use Drew's band, Wolfgang Von Colt ("More Than Words/Heaven"). Stacee's manager, Paul Gill, schedules an interview with Constance Sack, a reporter for Rolling Stone.

Constance mentions rumors of Stacee's difficult behavior and implies he was kicked out of Arsenal, which Stacee denies ("Wanted Dead or Alive"). Stacee sends Sherrie for a bottle of scotch from his limo. Constance lashes out at the once-great Stacee; they recognize their mutual attraction and are about to have sex when Stacee sings ("I Want to Know What Love Is"). Ashamed, Constance leaves as Sherrie enters and collides with Stacee. Drew mistakenly believes that Sherrie and Stacee had sex and is angrily inspired to sing ("I Wanna Rock") for the opening act. Drew and Sherrie break up and she quits the Bourbon Room. Paul, impressed with his performance, offers Drew a record deal as Arsenal sings their last song of the night ("Pour Some Sugar on Me"). Arsenal's performance racks up $31,203 for Dennis and Lonny, but Gill takes the night's proceeds as part of "Stacee's take".

Sherrie takes refuge at a strip club, the Venus Club, where owner Justice Charlier offers her a job as a dancer ("Shadows of the Night/Harden My Heart"), but Sherrie chooses to wait tables. She realizes she needs more money, as Drew signs to Gill's record label ("Here I Go Again"). Dennis worries the Bourbon Room will close and that he has disappointed everyone. Lonny confesses his love for him, and Dennis reciprocates ("Can't Fight This Feeling"). Drew discovers his record deal makes him part of hip-hop boy band "The Zee Guyeezz" (double the e's, double the z's, double the flava) as Joshy Zee, while Sherrie decides to become a dancer at the Venus Club ("Any Way You Want It").

Sherrie visits the Hollywood Sign, where she finds Drew, whose life has also not gone as planned. She tells him she did not have sex with Stacee and will be returning to Oklahoma. They part ways, lamenting their situation ("Every Rose Has Its Thorn"). Drew's lonely wanderings take him to the Empire Records store where he spots Sherrie's stolen albums, apparently having been sold to the store by the thief. Drew finds and buys all the Sherrie-marked albums he can find and delivers them to the Venus Room. Upon receiving Drew's gift, Sherrie rekindles her love for Drew, and at Justice's urging, she heads to the Bourbon Room to reclaim true love.

Stacee realizes his feelings for Constance ("Rock You Like a Hurricane") and calls Rolling Stone to learn that she is covering his show at The Bourbon Room. Stacee rushes to the venue, where Lonny leads the patrons against Patricia's protest group ("We're Not Gonna Take It/We Built This City"). Stacee recognizes Patricia, whom Lonny exposes as a former Arsenal groupie. He also fires Paul for taking the night's proceeds and returns them to Dennis.

As the Zee Guyeezz are rejected by the crowd at the Bourbon Room, Drew spots Sherrie in the audience and leaves the stage. They reconcile, and Drew fires Paul. Sherrie reunites Wolfgang Von Colt onstage, where she and Drew perform the song he wrote for her ("Don't Stop Believin'"). Stacee, who is having sex with Constance in the bathroom, is moved by the song.

Eight months later, Stacee has rejoined Arsenal and performs the song with Drew and Sherrie, now part of Wolfgang Von Colt, at Dodger Stadium in front of a crowd including Dennis, Lonny, Justice, a pregnant Constance, and Patricia, who has returned to her rock 'n' roll persona.

== Cast ==
- Julianne Hough as Sherrie Christian
- Diego Boneta as Drew Boley
- Russell Brand as Lonny Barnett
- Paul Giamatti as Paul Gill
- Catherine Zeta-Jones as Patricia Whitmore
- Malin Åkerman as Constance Sack
- Mary J. Blige as Justice Charlier
- Alec Baldwin as Dennis Dupree
- Tom Cruise as Stacee Jaxx
- Bryan Cranston as Mayor Mike Whitmore
- Will Forte as Mitch Miley
- Jack Mountford as Joey

Additionally, Kevin Nash and Jeff Chase starred as Jaxx's bodyguards. Constantine Maroulis, who played Drew in the original Broadway cast, appears as the Capitol Records executive during "Any Way You Want It".

Several 1980s musicians also made cameo appearances throughout the film, including Kevin Cronin of REO Speedwagon, Sebastian Bach of Skid Row, Debbie Gibson, Nuno Bettencourt of Extreme, Joel Hoekstra of Night Ranger/Whitesnake and Porcelain Black, during "We Built This City/We're Not Gonna Take It".

Eli Roth makes an appearance as Stefano, the Zee Guys' music video director, and T. J. Miller appears as a Rolling Stone receptionist.

== Production ==
=== Development ===
After the success of the original Off-Broadway production, the film rights were sold to Warner Bros. Pictures and New Line Cinema in early 2009. Adam Shankman was hired to direct the film in October that year. Chris D'Arienzo, creator of the stage musical, revealed he was originally attached to write and direct the film, wishing to have it visualised as similar to Metro-Goldwyn-Mayer (MGM) musicals such as Singin' in the Rain, however the studio elected to hire someone they felt they could trust with the budget they wanted to give the film, resulting in Shankman's hiring.

=== Casting ===
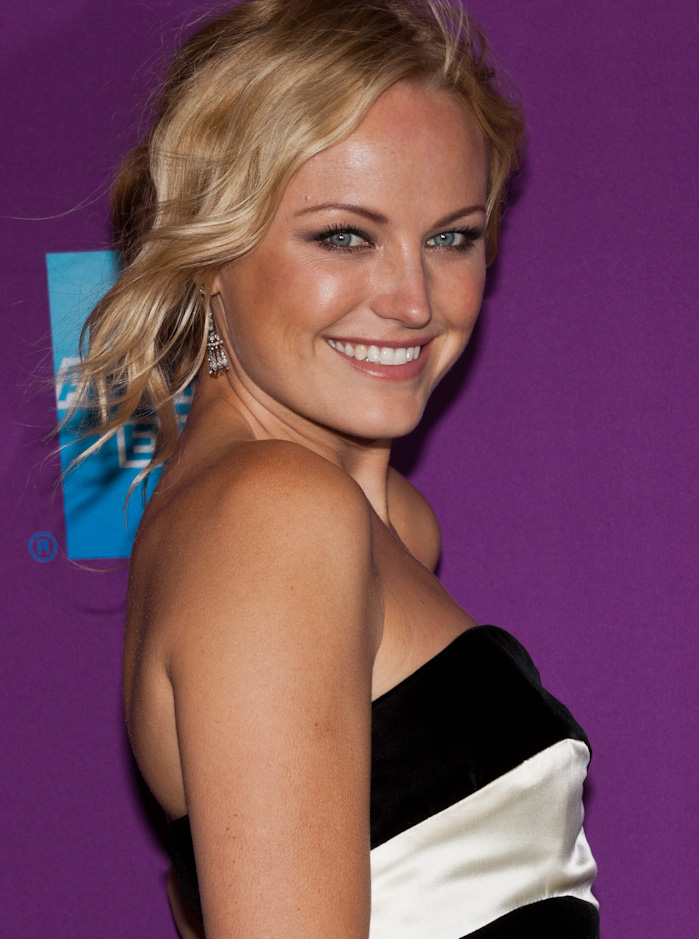
Malin Åkerman was the last member of the cast to be added, in the role of Constance Sack.

Tom Cruise played Stacee Jaxx in the film. Shankman knew Cruise was in when he heard him on the first go around of his voice lesson, confirming he "actually has a fantastic voice." Cruise had been singing five hours a day to prepare for his work as musician Stacee Jaxx. "It's this brilliant mashup, it seems, of Axl Rose, Bret Michaels, Keith Richards and Jim Morrison," Shankman said of what to expect from Cruise. All of the actors sing their own parts in the film. Cruise said that he had always wanted to appear in a musical but he found the idea frightening because he was uncertain whether he could actually pull it off.

On February 14, 2011, it was announced that Mary J. Blige had signed on to play Justice Charler in the film. On March 3, 2011, it was confirmed that Julianne Hough would play the role of Sherrie, Drew's love interest. On March 6, 2011, it was confirmed that Alec Baldwin would play the role of Dennis Dupree in the film. Baldwin's agreement to star in the film prompted Warner Bros. to have the film fast-tracked. On March 24, 2011, it was announced that Paul Giamatti would be in the film, playing the manager of Stacee Jaxx.

Pretty Little Liars star Diego Boneta was confirmed to play the male protagonist, Drew Boley, on April 5, 2011. Not wanting an older actor to act like he is 23, Shankman thought it better to go as authentic as possible, "and Diego is absolutely that. He is [a] kid who came to Los Angeles with a dream and who sings and has an amazing voice, and drive. And he's also as honest and sweet as you can possibly make him and he's authentically the age. It creates a piece of something on screen that I don't have to fabricate." Of Boneta's audition, Shankman said, "It's that feeling you get when you realized you've discovered lightning in a bottle. It reminds me of when Zac Efron auditioned for Hairspray, Channing Tatum for Step Up, and Liam Hemsworth auditioned for The Last Song. When the guy walks in, the guy walks in!" Shankman also said he did not know that Boneta was a Latin music star until after he auditioned. "I have since seen him on stage and in his concerts, and he totally owns the room," Shankman said.

Constantine Maroulis (Drew Boley from the musical) made a cameo appearance in the film like Ricki Lake did for Hairspray. On April 13, Russell Brand was confirmed to portray Lonny.

Catherine Zeta-Jones joined the cast on April 20, and portrayed an original character added to the story line. The unnamed character is described as "the Villainess of the movie" who "wants to shut down rock'n roll in the great city of Los Angeles." On May 1 Bryan Cranston joined the cast as the Mayor of Los Angeles, who is the husband of Catherine Zeta-Jones's character, and Malin Åkerman completed the cast when she was added as Constance Sack on May 3, 2011, a role Anne Hathaway and Amy Adams declined.

Singer Porcelain Black made a cameo in the film, playing a 1980s hair metal singer. She performed one of the sole original tracks for the film, "Rock Angels". "Rock Angels" was written and composed by Adam Anders and Desmond Child. Professional wrestler Kevin Nash played Stacee's bodyguard.

=== Filming ===
Principal photography began at Revolution Live, a small music venue in Fort Lauderdale. Scenes were shot at a Hollywood, Florida beach on May 24. The scenes at the iconic Hollywood Sign were filmed at the Monarch Hill Renewable Energy Park in Pompano Beach.

In June 2011, a full six-block section of N.W. 14th Street in Downtown Miami was decorated as a late 1980s version set of the Hollywood, California Sunset Strip complete with the Whisky a Go Go, Frederick's of Hollywood, Tower Records, Angelyne Billboard along with other landmarks.

On July 18, filming took place at the Hard Rock Casino in Hollywood, Florida, for a concert scene with "Don't Stop Believin'" and "Wanted Dead or Alive".

== Release ==
The film is distributed by New Line Cinema via Warner Bros. It had its world premiere in Los Angeles on June 8, 2012, where rock bands Def Leppard and Poison performed and Gene Simmons of Kiss was one of the VIP guest viewers attending, and was released theatrically on June 15, 2012.

=== Box office ===
On its opening weekend in theaters, the film grossed $14,447,269, ranking third place, behind the previous week's holdovers Madagascar 3: Europe's Most Wanted and Prometheus. The film did, however, do slightly better business than the other newcomer, That's My Boy.

Rock of Ages was a box office bomb, grossing $38,518,613 in North America and $20,900,000 in other territories for a worldwide total of $59,418,613, failing to bring back its $75 million budget. However, the film still has the seventh-highest opening ever for a musical.

In a 2019 interview, Adam Shankman said "I think it would have been huge if it had been something that was made for streaming. Here are the problems with what Rock of Ages was. I think it was released on a very complicated date. We were in the early summer days, there were marketing challenges to do with the cast, but that wasn't their fault," he explained. "The cast all loved it, and Tom Cruise really wanted to feel like an ensemble member and Warner Brothers wanted to put the whole thing on him. He wasn't a problem at all; he just had a real point of view. Then there was the other piece of it which was there was a misguided belief that you could market musicals to men as opposed to going the whole hog and making the movie more of a romantic fantasy. It's a weird cult movie. I kept calling one of those guys and saying, 'I think I'm making like a really expensive cult movie over here,' and they were like, 'No, no, it's great! You made Hairspray!' and my reaction was, 'I don't know. This isn't really about ending racism. Rock of Ages is something else entirely.' It has a lot of joy in it, but the story isn't really solid, so it's just a lot of fun, right?"

=== Critical reception ===
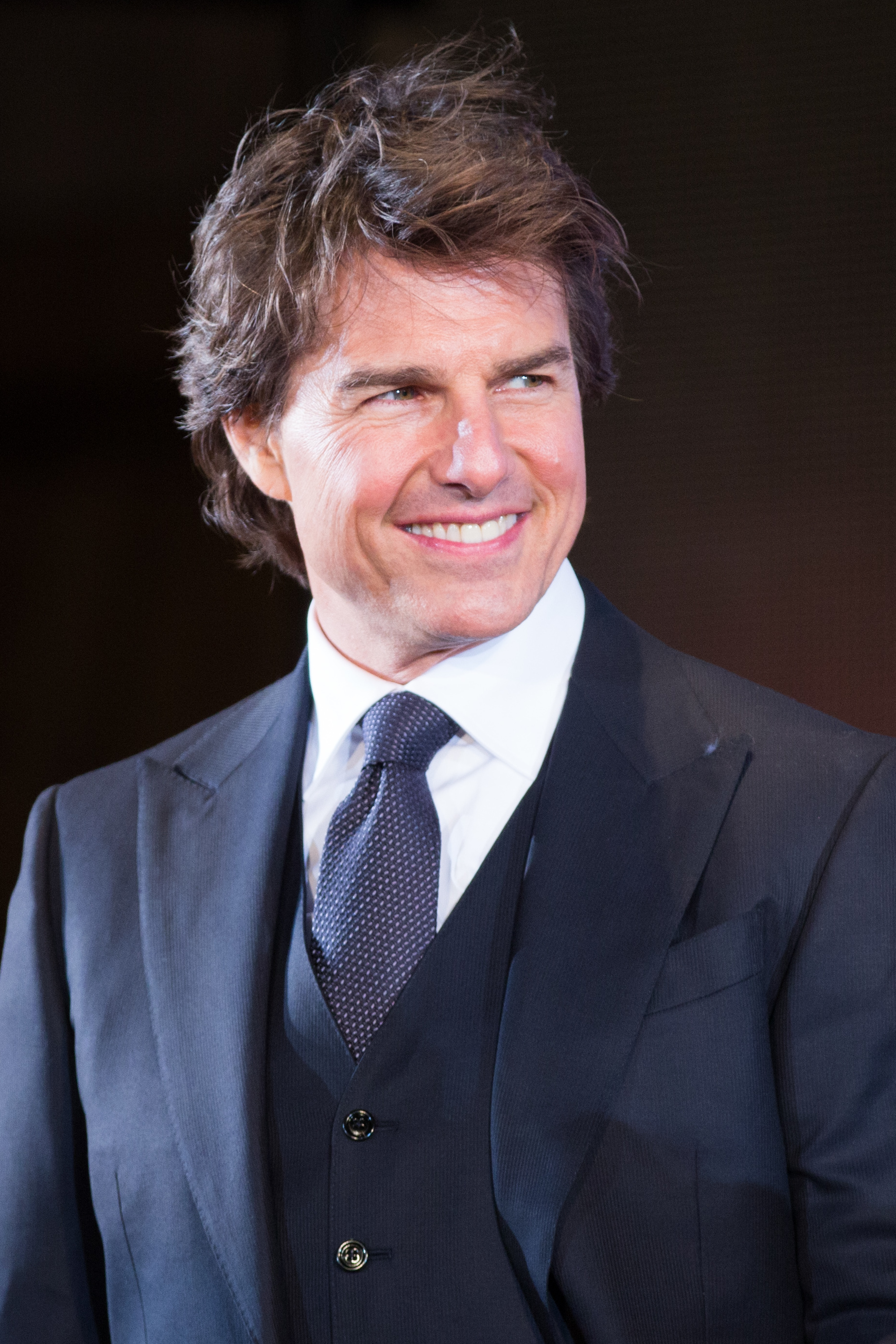
Tom Cruise saw positive reviews for his performance as Stacee Jaxx, with critics making parallels to his previous work in the films Interview with the Vampire and Magnolia.

The film received mixed reviews from critics, and has a critical score of 43% on Rotten Tomatoes based on 227 reviews, with an average rating of 6/10. The site's consensus states: "Its exuberant silliness is almost enough to make up for its utter inconsequentiality, but Rock of Ages is ultimately too bland and overlong to justify its trip to the big screen." Metacritic reports a 47 out of 100 rating, based on 42 critics, indicating "mixed or average reviews". Audiences polled by CinemaScore gave the film an average grade of "B" on an A+ to F scale.

Several critics gave praise to the performances, particularly that of Cruise as Stacee Jaxx. Peter Travers of Rolling Stone wrote: "Rock of Ages is pretty fun despite a terrible script, bland leads and awful wigs, mainly thanks to a performance by Tom Cruise as fictional hair metal rocker Stacee Jaxx." Writing for the San Francisco Chronicle, Amy Biancolli called his performance "a revelation", calling it a "reminder that he's always at his best in wildly transformative character parts". Steve Persall of the Tampa Bay Times praised Cruise's singing, and compared his performance to his earlier work as Lestat in Interview with the Vampire. In her review, Dana Stevens of Slate found Cruise's performance the "boldest use of the actor since Paul Thomas Anderson made him a rage-fueled motivational speaker in Magnolia".

As for the negative reviews, Rex Reed of The New York Observer was heavily critical of every aspect of the film, giving the film no stars out of his ranking of four and compared the film to Battlefield Earth and Howard the Duck. Writing for The Guardian, Peter Bradshaw derided the film, and the stage musical, as "bland and tiring". Bradshaw also criticized Russell Brand's accent, and gave slight praise to Cruise's performance. Claudia Puig, of USA Today, criticised the main leads of the film as "deadly dull dreamers" and the story as "tame and tone deaf". Richard Corliss for Time found the cast as being wasted in the film, highlighting Baldwin, Zeta-Jones, Cranston, and Cruise, to whose performance Corliss provided positive reception.

Rock of Ages creator Chris D'Arienzo, though having not seen the film adaptation, spoke negatively on the final product. "When the trailer came out, I saw there was a monkey in it, and then I knew what kind of movie it was. And I think America knew what sort of movie it was". D'Arienzo voiced disappointment in how the film depicted itself, stating,

Instead of coming from the point of view of "I'm going to validate this and elevate it," they embraced the kitsch and just made it more kitschy. They made it more silly and goofy. Not that our show isn't silly or goofy, but it's always from the point of view of "This is really good. And if you don't like Warrant's 'Cherry Pie,' then you're a fucking dick. Because it's good! And we're gonna show you why it's good!"

Alec Baldwin, who played Dennis Dupree in the film, was also critical, calling it "a horrible movie" and "a complete disaster". Baldwin had asked New Line Cinema studio head Toby Emmerich to replace him in his role shortly before the beginning of production.

=== Accolades ===
List of awards and nominations
Award	Category	Recipient(s)	Result
ALMA Awards	Favorite Movie Actor	Diego Boneta	Won
Golden Trailer Awards	Best Comedy		Nominated
Teen Choice Awards	Choice Summer Movie: Comedy/Musical		Nominated
Teen Choice Awards	Choice Movie: Breakout	Julianne Hough	Nominated
Grammy Awards	Best Compilation Soundtrack For Visual Media		Nominated

=== Home media ===
Rock of Ages was released on DVD and Blu-ray on October 9, 2012, by Warner Home Video. An extended cut is available on the Blu-ray, which includes the deleted "Rock You Like a Hurricane" lap dance scene between Stacee Jaxx (Tom Cruise) and Sherrie (Julianne Hough), which is also played in the theatrical version's end credits, as well as an extended version of "Waiting for a Girl Like You", between Drew (Diego Boneta) and Sherrie (Hough) (both scenes can also be found on YouTube). The extended cut runs 136 minutes, 13 minutes longer than the theatrical version, and is rated R for sexual content, as opposed to the PG-13 theatrical version.

== Soundtrack ==
The cover and track listing of the soundtrack was confirmed by Entertainment Weekly on April 30, 2012. The soundtrack was released on June 5, 2012. It debuted at No. 15 on Billboard 200, and peaked at No. 5 on that chart in its third week. It also debuted at No. 1 on the Top Soundtracks chart. It sold 267,000 copies in the US in 2012, making it the second best-selling soundtrack album of the year. It had sold 320,000 copies as of May 2013.

1. "Paradise City" – Tom Cruise
2. "Sister Christian" / "Just Like Paradise" / "Nothin' but a Good Time" – Julianne Hough, Diego Boneta, Russell Brand, Alec Baldwin
3. "Juke Box Hero" / "I Love Rock 'n' Roll" – Diego Boneta, Alec Baldwin, Russell Brand, Julianne Hough
4. "Hit Me With Your Best Shot" – Catherine Zeta-Jones
5. "Waiting for a Girl Like You" – Diego Boneta, Julianne Hough
6. "More Than Words" / "Heaven" – Julianne Hough, Diego Boneta
7. "Wanted Dead or Alive" – Tom Cruise, Julianne Hough
8. "I Want to Know What Love Is" – Tom Cruise, Malin Åkerman
9. "I Wanna Rock" – Diego Boneta
10. "Pour Some Sugar on Me" – Tom Cruise
11. "Harden My Heart" – Julianne Hough, Mary J. Blige
12. "Shadows of the Night" / "Harden My Heart (reprise)" – Mary J. Blige, Julianne Hough
13. "Here I Go Again" – Diego Boneta, Paul Giamatti, Julianne Hough, Mary J. Blige, Tom Cruise
14. "Can't Fight This Feeling" – Russell Brand, Alec Baldwin
15. "Any Way You Want It" – Mary J. Blige, Constantine Maroulis, Julianne Hough
16. "Undercover Love" – Diego Boneta
17. "Every Rose Has Its Thorn" – Julianne Hough, Diego Boneta, Tom Cruise, Mary J. Blige
18. "Rock You Like a Hurricane" – Julianne Hough, Tom Cruise
19. "We Built This City" / "We're Not Gonna Take It" – Russell Brand, Catherine Zeta-Jones
20. "Don't Stop Believin'" – Julianne Hough, Diego Boneta, Tom Cruise, Alec Baldwin, Russell Brand, Mary J. Blige

The following songs appear in the film as sung by the original artists. These songs do not appear on the official soundtrack.

Title	Artist	Notes
"I Remember You"	Skid Row	
"Oh Sherrie"	Steve Perry	
"Everybody Wants Some!!"	Van Halen	
"Rock of Ages"	Def Leppard	
"Bringin' On the Heartbreak"	Def Leppard	
"Talk Dirty to Me"	Poison	
"No One Like You"	Scorpions	
"Cum On Feel the Noize"	Quiet Riot	Original by Slade, end credits
"Cherry Pie"	Warrant	Extended cut

=== Musical numbers ===
#	Title	Performed by	Original artist	Notes
1	"Paradise City"	Tom Cruise	Guns N' Roses	Opening credits
2	"Sister Christian" / "Just Like Paradise" / "Nothin' but a Good Time"	Julianne Hough, Diego Boneta, Russell Brand and Alec Baldwin	Night Ranger / David Lee Roth / Poison	
3	"Juke Box Hero" / "I Love Rock 'n' Roll"	Diego Boneta, Alec Baldwin, Russell Brand and Julianne Hough	Foreigner / The Arrows (later famously covered by Joan Jett and the Blackhearts)	
4	"Hit Me with Your Best Shot"	Catherine Zeta-Jones	Pat Benatar	
5	"Waiting for a Girl (Boy) Like You"	Diego Boneta and Julianne Hough	Foreigner	
6	"More Than Words" / "Heaven"	Julianne Hough and Diego Boneta	Extreme / Warrant	
7	"Wanted Dead or Alive"	Tom Cruise and Julianne Hough	Bon Jovi	
8	"I Want to Know What Love Is"	Tom Cruise and Malin Åkerman	Foreigner	
9	"I Wanna Rock"	Diego Boneta	Twisted Sister	
10	"Pour Some Sugar on Me"	Tom Cruise	Def Leppard	
11	"Harden My Heart"	Julianne Hough and Mary J. Blige	Quarterflash	
12	"Shadows of the Night" / "Harden My Heart"	Mary J. Blige and Julianne Hough	Pat Benatar / Quarterflash	
13	"Here I Go Again"	Diego Boneta, Paul Giamatti, Julianne Hough, Mary J. Blige and Tom Cruise	Whitesnake	
14	"Can't Fight This Feeling"	Russell Brand and Alec Baldwin	REO Speedwagon	
15	"Any Way You Want It"	Mary J. Blige, Constantine Maroulis and Julianne Hough	Journey	
16	"Undercover Love"	Diego Boneta	The Zee Guys (or the "Z Guyeezz")	
17	"Every Rose Has Its Thorn"	Julianne Hough, Diego Boneta, Tom Cruise and Mary J. Blige	Poison	
18	"Rock You Like a Hurricane"	Julianne Hough and Tom Cruise	Scorpions	Extended cut
19	"We Built This City" / "We're Not Gonna Take It"	Russell Brand and Catherine Zeta-Jones	Starship / Twisted Sister	
20	"Don't Stop Believin'"	Julianne Hough, Diego Boneta, Tom Cruise, Alec Baldwin, Russell Brand, Mary J. Blige and Catherine Zeta-Jones	Journey	
21	"Paradise City"	Tom Cruise	Guns N' Roses	End credits
22	"Rock You Like a Hurricane"	Julianne Hough and Tom Cruise	Scorpions	End credits
