= Take Another Picture =

Studio album by Quarterflash
- Released: March 1983
- Genre: Rock
- Length: 39:46
- Label: Geffen
- Producer: John Boylan

Quarterflash chronology
Quarterflash (1981)	Take Another Picture (1983)	Back into Blue (1985)

Professional ratings
Review scores
Source	Rating
AllMusic	3/5 stars
Record Mirror	3/5 stars

Take Another Picture is the second album by the band Quarterflash. It was released in 1983 by Geffen Records and features the single, "Take Me to Heart," which reached No. 14 on the US Billboard Hot 100. It also hit No. 6 on the Billboard Album Rock Tracks chart and No. 28 Adult Contemporary. The title track became the follow-up single, which reached No. 58 on the Hot 100.

== Track listing ==
All lyrics and music written by Marv Ross, except where noted. All lead vocals by Rindy Ross except where noted.

Side One
No.	Title	Lyrics	Music	Lead vocals	Length
1.	"Take Me to Heart"				3:30
2.	"Take Another Picture"				4:27
3.	"Shane"		M. Ross, R. Ross		4:30
4.	"Eye to Eye"	Jack Charles	Charles, M. Ross	Charles	4:11
5.	"It Don't Move Me"		Charles, M. Ross, R. Ross		4:03

Side Two
No.	Title	Lyrics	Music	Lead vocals	Length
6.	"Shakin' the Jinx"				4:55
7.	"Make It Shine"				4:08
8.	"One More Round to Go"	Charles	Charles	Charles	3:40
9.	"Nowhere Left to Hide"		M. Ross, R. Ross		4:02
10.	"It All Becomes Clear"	M. Ross	Charles	Charles	2:20

== Personnel ==
Quarterflash

- Rindy Ross – lead vocals, alto and soprano saxophones
- Marv Ross – guitars, guitar synthesizer
- Jack Charles – lead vocals, guitar
- Rick DiGiallonardo – piano, synthesizers, Hammond B-3 organ
- Rich Gooch – bass, backing vocals
- Brian David Willis – drums, backing vocals, percussion

Additional Personnel:

- Paulinho Da Costa – additional percussion
- Joe Walsh – slide guitar on "It Don't Move Me"
- John Boylan – OBXa on "It All Becomes Clear"
- Bill Champlin – additional backing vocals
- Timothy Schmit – additional backing vocals
- Tommy Funderburk – additional backing vocals
- Tom Kelly – additional backing vocals
- James Newton Howard – string arrangement and conducting on "Eye to Eye"

== Charts ==
Chart (1983)	Peak position
Canada Top Albums/CDs (RPM)	69
US Billboard 200	34
