= Sister Christian =

Single by Night Ranger

from the album Midnight Madness
- B-side: "Chippin' Away"
- Released: March 1984
- Recorded: 1983
- Genre: Glam metal; arena rock
- Length: 5:02 (album); 4:14 (7" single)
- Label: MCA; Epic (Canada)
- Songwriter: Kelly Keagy
- Producer: Pat Glasser

Night Ranger singles chronology
"(You Can Still) Rock in America" (1983)	"Sister Christian" (1984)	"When You Close Your Eyes" (1984)

Music video
- "Sister Christian" on YouTube

"Sister Christian" is a song by the American band Night Ranger. A power ballad, it was released in March 1984 as the second single from their second album Midnight Madness (1983). It was written and sung by the band's drummer, Kelly Keagy, for his sister. It was the band's biggest hit, peaking at number five on the US Billboard Hot 100, and staying on the charts for 24 weeks. It also reached No. 1 in Canada. The song is used in several films, including Boogie Nights (1997), Superstar (1999), Friday the 13th (2009), and Air (2023). The song is also used in South Park season 28 episode 1, "Twisted Christian". It was ranked number 32 on VH1's 100 Greatest Songs of the 1980s. It is also featured in the 2002 videogame Grand Theft Auto Vice City on the in-game radio station Emotion 98.3.

== Origin and meaning ==
Inspired by his younger sister, Keagy originally sang "Sister Christy, oh the time has come". Upon returning from a visit to his hometown of Eugene, Oregon, Keagy wrote the song at his San Francisco apartment after being astonished at the speed at which his sister was growing up.

Keagy later recalled that "after we started playing it a lot, Jack turned to me and said, 'what exactly are you saying?'", adding that bandmate Jack Blades "thought the words were Sister Christian, instead of Sister Christy, so it just stuck".

The meaning of the lyric, "You're motoring. What's your price for flight? In finding Mr. Right?" has generated significant attention and debate. In a VH-1 Behind the Music interview, the band stated that the term "motoring" should be interpreted to mean "cruising".

== Differences between album version and 7" single version ==
On the single version, part of the second chorus is omitted. More specifically, the words "You've got him in your sight. And driving through the night," are omitted from the single version. The third chorus is repeated once on the album version, but never on the single.

== Music video ==
The music video (which uses the shorter single version) was filmed within San Rafael High School.

== Other versions ==
A newly recorded acoustic version of the song was produced for the band's ninth album, Hole in the Sun. A medley at the beginning of the movie Rock of Ages starts with a cover of this song.

Glee covered the song in its Season Four premiere episode, "The New Rachel". It was sung by junior student Brody Weston (portrayed by Dean Geyer) in the co-ed bathrooms of NYADA. The poultry company Foster Farms covered the song with singing chickens. Jensen Ackles covered the song at VegasCon 2015 Salute to Supernatural Las Vegas 2015, with the band Louden Swain, and Rob Benedict.

== Personnel ==
Night Ranger

- Jack Blades – bass-guitar, backing vocals
- Brad Gillis – guitars, backing vocals
- Jeff Watson – lead guitar, synth
- Alan Fitzgerald – piano
- Kelly Keagy – drums, lead vocals

Production

- Pat Glasser – producer
- John Van Nest – engineer
- Brian Gardner – mastering

== Charts ==
=== Weekly charts ===
Chart (1984–1985)	Peak position
Australian Singles (Kent Music Report)	99
Canada Top Singles (RPM)	1
Germany (GfK)	67
US Billboard Hot 100	5
US Mainstream Rock (Billboard)	2

=== Year-end charts ===
Chart (1984)	Peak position
US Top Pop Singles (Billboard)	40
