= 7 Wishes (Night Ranger album) =

Studio album by Night Ranger
- Released: May 20, 1985
- Studios: Image Recording, Hollywood, Fantasy Studios, Berkeley and The Site, San Rafael, California
- Genres: Hard rock; AOR
- Length: 42:15
- Label: MCA
- Producer: Pat Glasser

Night Ranger chronology
Midnight Madness (1983)	7 Wishes (1985)	Big Life (1987)

Singles from 7 Wishes
- 1. "Sentimental Street" Released: May 1985; 2. "Four in the Morning (I Can't Take Any More)" Released: August 1985; 3. "Goodbye" Released: October 1985

Professional ratings
Review scores
Source	Rating
AllMusic	4/5 stars
Classic Rock	Superior
Collector's Guide to Heavy Metal	4/10
Record Collector	3/5 stars

7 Wishes is the third studio album by the American hard rock band Night Ranger, released in 1985 and produced by Pat Glasser. The album features three Billboard Hot 100 chart hits: "Sentimental Street" reached No. 8, "Four in the Morning" No. 19 and "Goodbye" No. 17.

The title of "Four in the Morning (I Can't Take Any More)" describes the time of day Jack Blades wrote the song. In an interview with the Songfacts website, he explained, "Literally, I wrote that song at 4 in the morning. I mean, I woke up, and I had an idea, (singing) 'I can't take anymore, I can't fake anymore, it's such a hard time loving you.'"

"Interstate Love Affair" appeared on the soundtrack to the motion picture Teachers (1984), and "This Boy Needs to Rock" appeared on the soundtrack for Explorers (1985).

== Track listing ==
Side one
No.	Title	Writer(s)	Length
1.	"Seven Wishes"	Jack Blades	4:53
2.	"Faces"	Kelly Keagy, Blades, Alan Fitzgerald	4:12
3.	"Four in the Morning"	Blades	3:54
4.	"I Need a Woman"	Blades	4:40
5.	"Sentimental Street"	Blades	4:13

Side two
No.	Title	Writer(s)	Length
6.	"This Boy Needs to Rock"	Blades, Brad Gillis	3:59
7.	"I Will Follow You"	Fitzgerald, Blades	4:15
8.	"Interstate Love Affair"	Blades	3:15
9.	"Night Machine"	Blades, Keagy, Gillis	4:35
10.	"Goodbye"	Jeff Watson, Blades	4:19

- "Four in the Morning" titled "Four in the Morning (I Can't Take Any More)" on the single release

== Personnel ==
Night Ranger

- Jack Blades – bass, lead vocals
- Jeff Watson – guitars
- Brad Gillis – guitars, vocals
- Alan Fitzgerald – keyboards, vocals
- Kelly Keagy – drums, lead vocals

Additional musicians

- Vince Neil, Tommy Lee, Kevin Charles, David Sykes, Fishdog – backing vocals on "Night Machine"

Production

- Pat Glasser – producer
- John Van Nest – engineer, associate producer
- Duane Aslaksen, Steve Krause, David Luke – assistant engineers
- Brian Gardner – mastering

== Charts ==
Chart (1985)	Peak position
Canada Top Albums/CDs (RPM)	43
Japanese Albums (Oricon)	7
US Billboard 200	10

== Certifications ==
Region	Certification	Certified units/sales
United States (RIAA)	Platinum	1,000,000^{^}
^{^} Shipments figures based on certification alone.
