= Dawn Patrol (album) =

Studio album by Night Ranger
- Released: November 1982
- Studio: Allen Zentz Recording (Los Angeles)
- Genres: Hard rock; pop metal; AOR
- Length: 40:30
- Label: Boardwalk
- Producer: Pat Glasser

Night Ranger chronology
| Dawn Patrol (1982) | Midnight Madness (1983) |

Singles from Dawn Patrol
- 1. "Don't Tell Me You Love Me" Released: December 1982; 2. "Sing Me Away" Released: April 1983; 3. "Young Girl in Love" Released: July 1983

Professional ratings
Review scores
| Source | Rating |
|---|---|
| AllMusic | 4/5 stars |
| Classic Rock | Essential |
| Collector's Guide to Heavy Metal | 5/10 |
| Daily Vault | B+ |

Dawn Patrol is the debut studio album by American hard rock band Night Ranger, released in November 1982 by Neil Bogart's The Boardwalk Entertainment Co. The cover art of the album features dishes of the Very Large Array in central New Mexico.

== Background ==
During the recording of the album, the band was known as just Ranger. The first issues of the album were printed and ready to be shipped when a country band from California was found to have the same name. The band decided to name themselves Night Ranger after the song that singer Jack Blades had written for the album, and Boardwalk proceeded to destroy every copy that had "Ranger" on it.

== Release ==
"Don't Tell Me You Love Me", the first single, which had a music video that entered heavy rotation on MTV, reached number 40 on the Billboard Hot 100 and number four on Billboard's Mainstream Rock Tracks chart.

The second single, "Sing Me Away", reached number 54 on the Hot 100 and number 39 on the Mainstream Rock Tracks chart in late spring of 1983. The Cabazon Dinosaurs, later featured in films like Pee-Wee's Big Adventure, appear in the song's music video.

== Track listing ==
Side one
| No. | Title | Writer(s) | Lead vocals | Length |
|---|---|---|---|---|
| 1. | "Don't Tell Me You Love Me" | Jack Blades | Blades | 4:19 |
| 2. | "Sing Me Away" | Kelly Keagy, Blades | Keagy | 4:09 |
| 3. | "At Night She Sleeps" | Keagy, Blades | Keagy | 4:08 |
| 4. | "Call My Name" | Blades | Blades | 3:42 |
| 5. | "Eddie's Comin' Out Tonight" | Blades | Blades | 4:26 |

Side two
| No. | Title | Writer(s) | Lead vocals | Length |
|---|---|---|---|---|
| 6. | "Can't Find Me a Thrill" | Blades | Blades and Keagy | 3:19 |
| 7. | "Young Girl In Love" | Keagy, Blades | Keagy | 3:32 |
| 8. | "Play Rough" | Blades | Blades | 4:14 |
| 9. | "Penny" | Blades | Keagy | 3:47 |
| 10. | "Night Ranger" | Blades | Blades | 4:22 |

== Personnel ==
Night Ranger

- Jack Blades – bass, lead vocals
- Jeff Watson – guitars
- Brad Gillis – guitars, vocals
- Alan Fitzgerald – keyboards, vocals
- Kelly Keagy – drums, lead vocals

Production

- Pat Glasser – producer
- John Van Nest – engineer
- Tucker Williamson – studio assistant
- Brian Gardner – mastering
- Mike Beard – graphic effects

== Charts ==
| Chart (1983) | Peak position |
|---|---|
| Canada Top Albums/CDs (RPM) | 86 |
| US Billboard 200 | 38 |

== Certifications ==
| Region | Certification | Certified units/sales |
|---|---|---|
| United States (RIAA) | Gold | 500,000^{^} |
^{^} Shipments figures based on certification alone.
