= Picture This (2008 film) =

2008 film by Stephen Herek

- Home video release poster
- Written by: Temple Mathews
- Directed by: Stephen Herek
- Starring: Ashley Tisdale; Kevin Pollak
- Music by: Richard Marvin
- Country of origin: United States
- Original language: English

Production
- Executive producers: R. J. Gilbert; Stephen Herek
- Producers: Brian Reilly; Patrick Hughes
- Production location: Montreal
- Cinematography: Bernard Couture
- Editor: Robin Russell
- Running time: 92 minutes
- Production companies: Blondie Girl Productions; Metro-Goldwyn-Mayer

Original release
- Network: ABC Family
- Release: July 13, 2008

Picture This is a 2008 American romantic comedy television film directed by Stephen Herek. Starring Ashley Tisdale and Kevin Pollak, the film was released on July 13, 2008, on television by ABC Family, branded as an ABC Family Original Movie, and on July 22, 2008, on DVD. The film is produced by Metro-Goldwyn-Mayer and drew 5.3 million viewers.

== Plot ==
The unpopular Mandy Gilbert lives with her strict father Tom and has only two friends, Alexa and Cayenne. She is bullied and mocked by the popular girls at her high school, particularly Lisa Cross. Lisa happens to be the girlfriend of Mandy's crush, swim team captain Drew Patterson. Mandy is about to turn 18 and wants her life to change.

Mandy decides to try out for the swim team, but loses her glasses at the pool and falls in the water unconscious. When she awakens, she learns that Drew gave her CPR and they talk to each other. Lisa thinks Mandy is a threat and tries to humiliate her by taking Drew to the pet shop where Mandy works. Instead, Drew is impressed by her knowledge of animals and invites her to hang out with him the next day.

Mandy turns 18 and her father surprises her by replacing her glasses and phone with an expensive new video phone and contact lenses. Her father reveals his intentions to join her when she moves to attend UCSB next year, but Mandy is too afraid to voice her concerns about it. Later that day, Mandy flirts with Drew at the lake near school against her father's wishes. When Lisa discovers that Mandy is with Drew, she becomes outraged and uses Mandy's phone, which Mandy had dropped, to film them. Lisa sends the video to Tom, who confronts Mandy. Before going home, Drew invites Mandy to his party on Saturday and Mandy happily accepts. At home, Tom is disappointed in Mandy's actions and bars her from going out or using electronics.

The day of the party, Mandy creates a plan to pretend she is studying at Alexa's house with Alexa's mom as a chaperone. Meanwhile, as Tom checks on Mandy throughout the day, Mandy, Alexa and Cayenne find themselves the victims of a series of unfortunate events that nearly ruin their scheme; including Lisa destroying Mandy's party dress and then later buying the same one Mandy buys as a replacement, Lisa poisoning Mandy with a macadamia nut shake to which Mandy is extremely allergic, getting a furniture salesman to impersonate Alexa's stepfather, their car getting towed and having to win money to get it back in a band contest, nearly crashing the car, and Lisa getting them banned at the front gate. However, the trio prevails at every obstacle.

Mandy tells Alexa and Cayenne she wants to tell her father the truth about her whereabouts. When she does, Tom tells her he trusts her, and asks her if he has been a good father. Mandy tells him he is a great father, and decides not to tell him she is actually at a party. Mandy attends the party with Drew. Alexa and Cayenne decide to tell Mandy of the Patterson rumor: every year at the Patterson Bash, a Patterson boy takes a girl up to the tower and takes her virginity in the shower. Mandy is hurt and confused, but Cayenne convinces her to be strong and go to the party. Drew is ecstatic to see her and asks to see her in the tower. To her surprise, the "tower" actually turns out to be Drew's photography studio, which is filled with pictures of his family, friends, pets, and one of Mandy that he took at the lake. Seeing this, Mandy is relieved and realizes he just wants to spend time with her.

Drew goes to the bathroom to wash his hands, but does not tell Mandy what he is doing. Mandy thinks he is taking a shower and leaves after she becomes uncomfortable. Meanwhile, Lisa has been drinking heavily all night and Alexa films her vomiting from under a glass table. The clip is shown playing on video screens as the girls exit the party, much to Lisa's humiliation.

Back at home, Tom shows Mandy an updated detachable version of the model home he built for them. However, Mandy sees this as a metaphor for their relationship, and explains that she does not want to feel detachable. Tom says that he trusts her and feels he should let her go.

Afterwards, Mandy and her friends attend their senior prom. Drew, the prom king, is about to crown Lisa as prom queen, but realizes that he truly wants Mandy. Drew brings Mandy up to the center stage and crowns her as the prom queen, as they share a passionate kiss.

== Cast ==
- Ashley Tisdale as Mandy Gilbert
- Kevin Pollak as Tom Gilbert
- Robbie Amell as Drew Patterson
- Lauren Collins as Alexa
- Shenae Grimes as Cayenne
- Cindy Busby as Lisa Cross
- Marie-Marguerite Sabongui as Blair
- Angela Galuppo as Kimberly
- Maxim Roy as Marsha
- Jesse Rath as Guy on Lawn
- Dani Kind as High School Girl
- Annie Murphy as Girl on Phone

== Production ==
The film was executive produced by Tisdale's company Blondie Girl Productions and directed by Stephen Herek. Tisdale said, "When I read the script for Picture This!, I just fell in love with the lead character Mandy, this goofy, unpopular, girl next door who knows what she wants, but isn't willing to sacrifice who she is to get it... Mandy's real and I think a lot of kids will relate to that. It reminds me a lot of when I was in high school."

The film was shot on location in Montreal, Quebec, during the summer months of 2007. Fender instruments, Juicy Couture, and Swiss Army all contributed props to the film. The freeway scene was actually shot in the borough of LaSalle. The mall scene was shot at Fairview Pointe-Claire. The school scenes were recorded at École secondaire du Chêne-Bleu in Pincourt.

== Music and sound ==
The soundtrack of Picture This was never available to download in stores. It features Pat Benatar's 1980s single "Shadows of the Night", performed by Tisdale. The song "4ever" by The Veronicas could be heard on the promotional movies spots.

=== Soundtrack ===
No.	Title	Artist	Length
1.	"Shadows of the Night" (D.L. Byron)	Ashley Tisdale (original by Pat Benatar)	3:32
2.	"That Stuff" (Molly Mostek, Larry Cooper)	Molly M	3:05
3.	"Sincerely Me" (Jay Condiotti, Danielle McKee, Eddie Galan, Andrew Lane)	Danielle McKee	4:01
4.	"Better" (Cori Yarckin, Jimmy Robertson Landry)	Cori Yarckin	3:35
5.	"All So Different" (Jessica Penner)	Chandelle	3:11
6.	"Welcome To The Party" (Molly Mostek)	Molly M	5:45
7.	"You Are Part Of Everything" (Josh Kelly)	Josh Kelly	3:27
8.	"Day In The Sun" (Kevin Savigar, David Nicholas, Michael Stangel)	Angie Hilton	3:42
9.	"Unstoppable" (Joel Wachbrit, Michael Sokolis)	Buddha Belly	2:20
10.	"Come To The Night" (Joe Faraci)	Faraci	3:22
11.	"Because I'm Awesome" (Kelly Ogden, Luis Cabezas)	The Dollyrots	4:39
12.	"Through My Eyes" (David Osborne)	Autumn's Descent	2:24
13.	"Symphony No. 9: Ode To Joy" (Beethoven)	Beethoven	4:16
14.	"I'm Just Like You" (Adam Derborn)	Deadstar Assembly	3:09
15.	"Drive" (Darren Reynolds)	The Humidiflyers	4:26
16.	"Let Me Fall" (Joe Faraci)	Faraci	4:15
17.	"Dale Que Dale" (Rafael Torres, Edgard E. Jaude, Michael Garcia)	Mikeyton	4:47
18.	"Tell Me You Love Me" (Daniel Cage)	Daniel Cage	3:45
19.	"Shiver" (Genzo, Cheryl Yie, Julian Medeiros)	Cheryl Yie	3:04
20.	"Soft Place To Fall" (Michael Maslin, Paul Gordon)	Joelle James	3:66
21.	"Your Ride" (Nadia Fay, Jay Condiotti)	Girls Love Shoes	4:00
22.	"Fragile Tough Girl" (Jo Davidson)	Jo Davidson	3:01
23.	"Pictures of You" (Jeffrey Mark Blue)	The Last Goodnight	4:00

== Home media ==
The film was released on DVD in the United States on July 22, 2008.
