= Girl in the Wind =

Studio album by Quarterflash
- Released: 1991
- Genre: Rock
- Label: Epic
- Producer: Charlie Midnight

Quarterflash chronology
| Back into Blue (1985) | Girl in the Wind (1991) | Harden My Heart: The Best of Quarterflash (1997) |

Girl in the Wind is the fourth album by Quarterflash, released on Epic Records in late 1991. Quarterflash, led by the husband-wife team of Rindy and Marv Ross, recruited new members for this release: Sandin Wilson on bass/vocals, Greg Williams on drums, Doug Fraser on guitars, and Mel Kubik on keyboards and saxophone. The new members gave the AOR band an edgier sound. Due to record-label changes, the album was only released in Europe.

The album includes acoustic rock songs "Something More", "Where I Stand", and "Diamond In The Rough", and the love ballads "Is It Any Wonder" and "Let Somebody Love You". The band went on to record an unreleased album in 1995 with the same lineup.

Marv and Rindy Ross released an album in 2002 called Bliss that has several songs from Girl in the Wind as well as four songs from the unreleased album.

== Track listing ==
Girl in the Wind track listing
| No. | Title | Length |
|---|---|---|
| 1. | "Something More" | 5:17 |
| 2. | "Where I Stand" | 4:05 |
| 3. | "Girl in the Wind" | 5:04 |
| 4. | "Is It Any Wonder" | 4:24 |
| 5. | "Diamond in the Rough" | 3:59 |
| 6. | "One Less Lie" | 4:18 |
| 7. | "Love as a Last Resort" | 4:45 |
| 8. | "Without You" | 4:24 |
| 9. | "Paint It Blue" | 4:05 |
| 10. | "Let Somebody Love You" | 4:57 |
| Total length: | | 45:18 |

== Personnel ==
- Rindy Ross - vocals, saxophone
- Marv Ross - guitars
- Doug Fraser - guitars
- Mel Kubik - keyboards
- Sandin Wilson - bass
- Greg Williams - drums, percussion
