= Harden My Heart =

1981 single by Quarterflash

Single by Quarterflash

from the album Quarterflash
- B-side: "Don't Be Lonely"
- Released: September 1981
- Recorded: 1980
- Genre: Rock
- Length: 3:51
- Label: Geffen
- Songwriter: Marv Ross
- Producer: John Boylan

Quarterflash singles chronology
"Harden My Heart" (1981)	"Find Another Fool" (1982)

Music video
- "Harden My Heart" on YouTube

"Harden My Heart" is a song by American rock group Quarterflash, written by guitarist Marv Ross and included on the band's debut album, Quarterflash (1981). The song was originally released as a single in early 1980 by Seafood Mama, Quarterflash's predecessor band. Quarterflash's version became a top-10 hit in the United States, peaking at No. 3 on the Billboard Hot 100 in February 1982. The song's video features theatrics in and around an office trailer with dark corridors and swinging metal-halide light bulbs from the ceiling before it was bulldozed and torched.

== Background and release ==
Guitarist and songwriter Marv Ross said,

A friend of mine gave me the title. I came up with the lyrics very quickly. The title came first and I don’t really remember how the rest came about. I usually write the music and words simultaneously. It wasn’t a personal story – just made it up. The chords are simple but voiced so as to make it sound more complex than it is. The whole song is really the groove which we called a shuffle in those days. Rindy came up with the sax line. The whole thing was written in less than a week and recorded in our basement for the Seafood Mama version. It sold 10,000 copies in Portland and Seattle and was the key to us getting signed to Geffen records.

The first version was recorded by Seafood Mama in the band members' basement in Portland in 1980. After changing their name to Quarterflash and getting signed to Geffen, they re-recorded the song at the Record Plant in Los Angeles. Ross said the re-recording had a better guitar solo, as well as better sound quality in general.

After changing their name, Quarterflash released their self-titled debut album in 1981 that contains the new version of "Harden My Heart". This power ballad version was released as the album's first single. In February 1982, it reached No. 3 on the Billboard Hot 100, No. 1 on the Billboard Rock Top Tracks chart, and No. 41 on the Billboard Adult Contemporary chart. Worldwide, the song charted in Australia, Canada, New Zealand, South Africa, the United Kingdom, and German-speaking Europe.

== Personnel ==
- Rindy Ross: vocals, saxophone
- Marv Ross: guitars
- Jack Charles: guitars, vocals
- Rick DiGiallonardo: keyboards
- Rich Gooch: bass
- Brian David Willis: drums, percussion

== Charts ==
=== Weekly charts ===
Chart (1981–1982)	Peak position
Australia (Kent Music Report)	6
Austria (Ö3 Austria Top 40)	15
Canada Top Singles (RPM)	10
New Zealand (Recorded Music NZ)	12
South Africa (Springbok Radio)	7
Switzerland (Schweizer Hitparade)	5
UK Singles (Official Charts)	49
US Billboard Hot 100	3
US Adult Contemporary (Billboard)	41
US Rock Top Tracks (Billboard)	1
West Germany (GfK)	51

=== Year-end charts ===
Chart (1982)	Rank
Australia (Kent Music Report)	38
Canada Top Singles (RPM)	93
US Billboard Hot 100	13

== Certifications ==
Region	Certification	Certified units/sales
United States (RIAA)	Gold	500,000^{^}
^{^} Shipments figures based on certification alone.

== See also ==
- List of Billboard Mainstream Rock number-one songs of the 1980s
