= Quarterflash =

American rock band

- Origin: Portland, Oregon, US
- Years active: 1980–1985, 1990–2019
- Labels: Geffen Records, Epic Records
- Past members: Jack Charles; Rich Gooch; Jon Propp; Brian David Willis; Rick DiGiallonardo; Rindy Ross; Marv Ross
- Website: Official website

Quarterflash (previously stylized as QuarterFlash) was an American rock group formed in 1980 in Portland, Oregon. The band was originally made up of lead vocalist and saxophonist Orinda Sue "Rindy" Ross (born June 26, 1951) and her husband, guitarist Marvin "Marv" Ross (born January 30, 1951), along with Jack Charles (guitars), Rick DiGiallonardo (keyboards/synthesizers), Rich Gooch (electric bass), and Brian David Willis (drums and percussion).

== History ==
The group was formed by merging two popular Oregon bands, Seafood Mama (formerly Beggars Opera) and Pilot (not to be confused with the Scottish band of "Magic" fame). Continuing under the name Seafood Mama, the band originally released the single "Harden My Heart" on a local private label, Whitefire Records, in the spring of 1980 (with the B-side track being "City of Roses"). "Harden My Heart" was a big hit on Portland radio stations and got the band a one-hour TV special, Seafood Mama In Concert, on KOIN on June 5, 1980. "Harden My Heart" was rerecorded by the band after they renamed themselves Quarterflash. The name came from an Australian slang description of new immigrants as "a quarter flash, three-quarters foolish", which the Rosses found in a book at producer John Boylan's house.

Quarterflash signed to Geffen Records and released their self-titled debut album Quarterflash in September 1981. It reached No. 8 on Billboard's Top LPs & Tapes chart and sold over a million copies, earning RIAA platinum status on June 30, 1982. The album contained the new version of "Harden My Heart", which became their biggest single, reaching No. 3 on the Billboard Hot 100 (and the Top 10 in France). The follow-up single from the album, "Find Another Fool", reached No. 16. A second one-hour Portland television special, Quarterflash In Concert, was broadcast on KOIN on October 22, 1981, with a radio simulcast on KGON. This concert was taped at the Paramount Theatre (the present-day Arlene Schnitzer Concert Hall) on October 15, 1981. In an interview from 1982, Rindy Ross said that she viewed the saxophone as an extension of her voice, enabling her to express things she could not express with her voice alone.

In between LPs, the band appeared on the soundtrack albums of two of 1982's biggest films, charting the theme to Ron Howard's Night Shift up to No. 60 on the Billboard Hot 100, and landing one of their B-sides, "Don't Be Lonely", in Fast Times at Ridgemont High.

Quarterflash's second album, Take Another Picture, was released in March 1983. It reached No. 34 on the Hot 100 and featured the single "Take Me to Heart", which charted at No. 14. Both Charles and DiGiallonardo left the group after the release of this album. Opting to continue as a four-piece, the group completed a third album featuring contributions from unofficial group keyboardist/guitarist Daniel Brandt. Released in 1985, Back Into Blue peaked at No. 150 on the Hot 100; following the lackluster reception of this album, the group was dropped by Geffen Records and they disbanded.

Quarterflash reunited in 1990, hiring session musicians, including bassist–vocalist Sandin Wilson, drummer Greg Williams, guitarist Doug Fraser, Mel Weith and Mel Kubik on saxophone and keyboards. The group's fourth album Girl in the Wind was released only in Europe by Epic Records in late 1991. That same year, Rindy and Marv Ross founded the historic music ensemble The Trail Band, which was formed at the request of the Oregon Trail Advisory Council to commemorate the 150th anniversary of the Oregon Trail.

In June 2008, Marv and Rindy Ross released a new Quarterflash album, Goodbye Uncle Buzz, but it did not chart. In September 2013, the band issued the album, Love Is a Road, which also failed to chart. The Rosses announced their March 23, 2019, concert at the Alberta Rose Theater in Portland would be their final show as Quarterflash and they would continue to perform as a duo.

== Discography ==
=== Studio albums ===
List of studio albums, with selected chart positions
Title	Album details	Peak chart positions		
Title	Album details	US	AUS	CAN
Quarterflash	Released: 1981	8	22	6
Take Another Picture	Released: 1983	34	—	—
Back into Blue	Released: 1985	150	—	—
Girl in the Wind	Released: 1991	—	—	—
Goodbye Uncle Buzz	Released: 2008	—	—	—
Love Is a Road	Released: 2013	—	—	—
"—" denotes a recording that did not chart or was not released in that territory.

=== Compilation albums ===
- The Best of Quarterflash: The Millennium Collection (1996)
- Harden My Heart: The Best of Quarterflash (1997)

=== Singles ===
List of singles, with selected chart positions
Title	Year	Peak chart positions							Album
Title	Year	US	US Rock	US AC	US CB	AUS	CAN	UK	Album
"Harden My Heart"	1981	3	1	41	4	6	10	49	Quarterflash
"Find Another Fool"	1982	16	12	—	16	—	21	—	Quarterflash
"Right Kind of Love"	1982	56	—	—	47	—	—	—	Quarterflash
"Night Shift"	1982	60	—	—	57	—	—	—	Night Shift soundtrack
"Take Me to Heart"	1983	14	6	28	15	—	19	—	Take Another Picture
"Take Another Picture"	1983	58	—	—	64	—	—	—	Take Another Picture
"Talk to Me"	1985	83	41	—	—	—	—	—	Back Into Blue
"Walking On Ice"	1985	—	—	—	—	—	—	—	Back Into Blue
"—" denotes a recording that did not chart or was not released in that territory.

== Sources ==
- Nite, Norm N.; Crespo, Charles (1982). Rock On: The Video Revolution, 1978-present. Vol. 3. New York City, New York: Harper & Row. ISBN 978-0-061-81644-4.
