= Kuyurgazinsky District =

Kuyurgazinsky District Куюргазинский район (Russian)
- District

Other transcription(s)
  - Bashkir: Көйөргәҙе районы
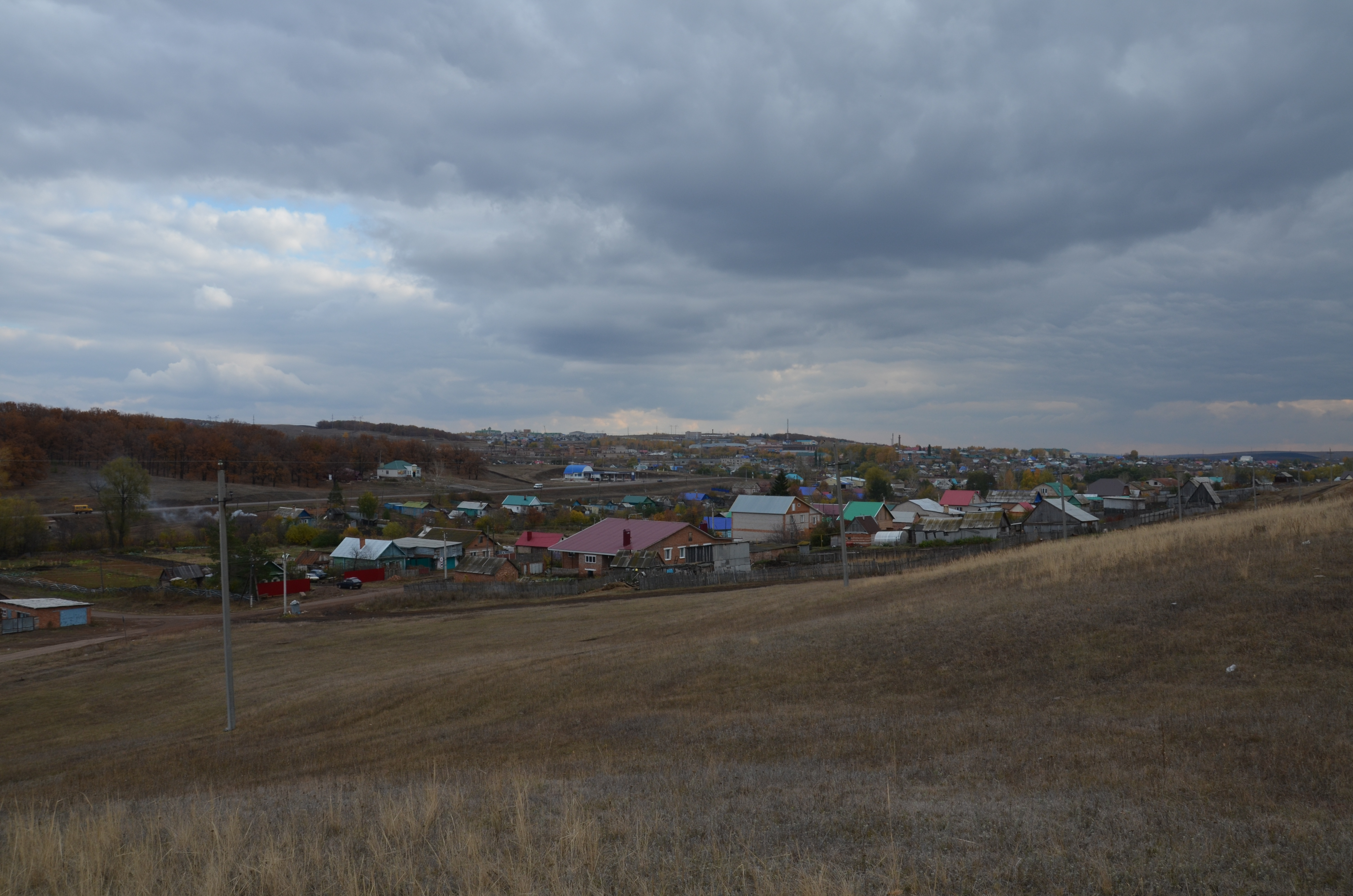
- The selo of Yermolayevo is the administrative center of the district

- Flag Coat of arms
- Location of Kuyurgazinsky District in the Republic of Bashkortostan
- Coordinates: 52°42′N 55°48′E
- Country: Russia
- Federal subject: Republic of Bashkortostan
- Established: January 31, 1935
- Administrative center: Yermolayevo

Area
  - Total: 2,235 km^{2} (863 sq mi)

Population (2010 Census)
  - Total: 25,125
  - Estimate (2018): 22,985 (−8.5%)
  - Density: 11.24/km^{2} (29.12/sq mi)
  - Urban: 0%
  - Rural: 100%

Administrative structure
  - Administrative divisions: 12 Selsoviets
  - Inhabited localities: 84 rural localities

Municipal structure
  - Municipally incorporated as: Kuyurgazinsky Municipal District
  - Municipal divisions: 0 urban settlements, 12 rural settlements
- Time zone: UTC+5 (MSK+2)
- OKTMO ID: 80639000
- Website: http://kuyurgaza.ru

Population of Kuyurgazinsky District
- 2010 Census: 25,125
- 2002 Census: 25,587
- 1989 Census: 23,753
- 1979 Census: 28,464

Kuyurgazinsky District (Russian: Куюрга́зинский райо́н; Bashkir: Көйөргәҙе районы, Köyörgäźe rayonı) is an administrative and municipal district (raion), one of the fifty-four in the Republic of Bashkortostan, Russia. It is located in the southwest of the republic and borders with Fyodorovsky and Meleuzovsky Districts in the north, Kugarchinsky District in the east, and with Orenburg Oblast in the east, south, and west. The area of the district is 2,235 square kilometers (863 sq mi). Its administrative center is the rural locality (a selo) of Yermolayevo. As of the 2010 Census, the total population of the district was 25,125, with the population of Yermolayevo accounting for 25.5% of that number.

== History ==
The district was established on January 31, 1935. Until 1992, it was called Kumertausky District (Кумертауский район).

== Administrative and municipal status ==
Within the framework of administrative divisions, Kuyurgazinsky District is one of the fifty-four in the Republic of Bashkortostan. The district is divided into twelve selsoviets, comprising eighty-four rural localities. As a municipal division, the district is incorporated as Kuyurgazinsky Municipal District. Its twelve selsoviets are incorporated as twelve rural settlements within the municipal district. The selo of Yermolayevo serves as the administrative center of both the administrative and municipal district.
