= Yermolayevo, Republic of Bashkortostan =

Yermolayevo Ермолаево
- Selo

Other transcription(s)
  - Bashkir: Ермолаевка
- Interactive map of Yermolayevo
- Location of Yermolayevo Yermolayevo (Bashkortostan)
- Coordinates: 52°43′N 55°48′E
- Country: Russia
- Federal subject: Bashkortostan
- Administrative district: Kuyurgazinsky District
- SelsovietSelsoviet: Yermolayevsky
- Founded: 1783

Population (2010 Census)
  - Total: 6,397

Administrative status
  - Capital of: Kuyurgazinsky District, Yermolayevsky Selsoviet

Municipal status
  - Municipal district: Kuyurgazinsky Municipal District
  - Rural settlement: Yermolayevsky Selsoviet Rural Settlement
  - Capital of: Kuyurgazinsky Municipal District, Yermolayevsky Selsoviet Rural Settlement
- Time zone: UTC+5 (MSK+2)
- Postal code: 453360–453361
- OKTMO ID: 80639412101

Yermolayevo (Russian: Ермола́ево; Bashkir: Ермолаевка) is a rural locality (a selo) and the administrative center of Kuyurgazinsky District in the Republic of Bashkortostan, Russia. Its population was 6,397 (2010 census); 6,342 (2002 census); 5,538 (1989 Soviet census).
